= Farewell to Reason =

1987 book by Paul Feyerabend

- Author: Paul Feyerabend
- Language: English
- Subjects: History of science Epistemology ancient philosophy
- Publisher: New Left Books
- Publication date: 1987
- Media type: Print (Hardcover and Paperback)
- Pages: 327
- ISBN: 0860918963
- Preceded by: Science as Art
- Followed by: Three Dialogues on Knowledge

Farewell to Reason is a 1987 book by the Austrian philosopher of science Paul Feyerabend. The book includes some reprinted essays published in other venues and was published by Verso Books, which also published Against Method and Science in a Free Society. The primary goal of the book is to trace the historical origins of "rationalism" and argue for a version of relativism and cultural diversity.

== Translations ==
Farewell to Reason has been translated into numerous languages:

- Spanish translation by José R. de Rivera: Adios a la razón, Tecnos: Madrid 1984, 300 pp.
- French translation by Baudouin Jurdant: Adieu à la raison, Seuil: Paris 1989, 373 pp.
- German translation by Jürgen Blasius: Irrwege der Vernunft, Suhrkamp: Frankfurt am Main 1989, 471 pp. Reprinted 1990.
- Italian translation by Marcello D'Agostino: Addio alla ragione, Armando: Roma 1990, 320 pp.
- Japanese translation: Risei yo saraba, Hoseidaigakushuppankyoku: Tokyo 1992, 34+399 pp.
- Portuguese translation: Adeus à razão, UNESP: São Paulo 2010, 399 pp.

The book was reprinted in 1988, 1990, 1993, 1994, 1996, and 1999. A 2nd edition was released including a new preface by Feyerabend.

== Content ==
Farewell to Reason begins with a lengthy chapter on relativism. He distinguishes it from absolutism, or the view that some views are entirely truth and their alternatives are false, pluralism, where multiple views are held simultaneously without critical interaction, and scientific pluralism where different traditions must critically engage with one another. He argues that there is no reason to necessarily accept science over other traditions and that traditions can learn from one another. Continuing on arguments made in Science in a Free Society, Feyerabend spells out the political implications of relativism including the claim that all traditions should be given equal access to resources necessary to develop their traditions. He continues by situating his relativism within a historical tradition including Herodotus, Protagoras, and several democratic theorists.

The second chapter argues that Xenophanes, who was praised by Karl Popper for inventing scientific rationalism, never provides an argument against the Homeric gods. Rather, Xenophanes begs the question and assumes that defenders of the Homeric worldview accept that there can be a single God. Xenophanes, rather than inventing rational criticism, provides an instructive episode in the history of relativism.

This is followed by several chapters that are reprinted essays on various topics including the role of theories in simplifying nature (a theme that would be explored in more detail in Conquest of Abundance), creativity, progress in the sciences, arts, and philosophy, Mach's principle, incommensurability, Aristotle's theory of mathematics, and critical reviews of some of Popper's books.

The final parts of the book include a lengthy letter where he argues, amongst other things, that cultural exchanges do not require shared assumptions or a shared language as well as a titular essay where he argues that philosophy should be abandoned as a practice and replaced by participation in particular traditions.
