= Insha-Allah Rahmati =

Iranian philosopher (born 1966)

- انشاءالله رحمتی
- Born: 22 December 1966 (age 59); Malayer, Iran

Education
- Education: Islamic Azad University (Ph.D.), University of Tehran (B.A. and M.A.)
- Thesis: Mind-body relation: a comparative study (Descartes and Mulla Sadra) (2001)
- Doctoral advisor: Gholamreza Aavani

Philosophical work
- Era: Contemporary philosophy
- Region: Islamic philosophy
- Main interests: Islamic philosophy, Philosophy of Religion, Ethics, Traditionalist School (perennialism)

Insha-Allah Rahmati (Persian: انشاءالله رحمتی; born 22 December 1966) is an Iranian philosopher, thinker, translator and a full professor of philosophy at Islamic Azad University in Tehran. His main interests are Ethics, Islamic philosophy and Traditionalist School (perennialism).

== Biography ==
Born in 1966 in Malayer in Iran, Rahmati graduated with a BA in philosophy in 1990 from the University of Tehran and He received a master's degree in philosophy from the same university in 1996. He acquired his PhD in 2001 from Islamic Azad University under the supervision of Gholamreza Aavani. His fields of study can be summarized as follows: Ethics and Philosophy of Religion and Islamic Philosophy. Most of his work in these three areas is in the form of translations of specialized texts with an introduction and explanations of these works. He has provided some of the texts in the field of ethics, among which the most important are the Encyclopedia of Ethics ed. By Paul Edwards and Donald M. Borchert and the Critique of Practical Reason (Immanuel Kant's Second Critique). Among his activities has been to teach ethics philosophy in the form of academic courses as well as holding workshops for faculty members at various universities.

== Career ==
Full Professor of Islamic Azad University-Central Tehran branch; Department for Islamic Philosophy. For over two decades he has been teaching "Themes of analytical philosophy of religion" at the postgraduate and doctoral levels. A translation of Taliaferro's book "The Philosophy of Religion" is one of his achievements in this field. In the field of Islamic philosophy, in addition to teaching the classical texts of philosophy at various stages of undergraduate, postgraduate and doctoral studies, he has continuously tried to introduce new trends related to Islamic philosophy. In order to have a modern and effective reading of Islamic philosophy and spirituality, he devotes part of his research and studies to the work of traditionalists. Translating the books “Knowledge and the Sacred” by Sayyed Hossein Nasr, Art and Spirituality (Honar va Maanaviat) compilation of articles by traditionalists, as well as "Religion and Order of Nature" and "The Garden of Truth" are part of his efforts. In recent decades, there has been an ongoing effort to discuss Islamic philosophy and spirituality in the light of Henry Carbon's works. One of his most important research achievements in this field is the translation of Henry Corbin's masterpiece entitled " Iranian Islam: The Spiritual and Philosophical Perspectives " in four volumes. In his book, “Kīmīyā-e Khirad", some of his three areas of research in relation to each other, and the importance of each of them reviewed and examined.

== Bibliography ==
- S.H. Nasr (Chief Editor), The Study Quran, translation, introduction, and glosses, in 10 volumes, 2020–Present.
- Henry Corbin, En Islam Iranian, Aspects spirituels et philosophiques, in 4 Volumes, translation, introduction, and glosses, 2012 - 2020.
- P. Edwards and D. Borchert (Chief Editors), Encyclopedia of Philosophy of Religion, translation and introduction, 2020.
- P. Edwards and D. Borchert (Chief Editors), Encyclopedia of Aesthetics and Philosophy of Art, translation and introduction, 2019.
- Rudolf Otto, Mysticism East and West, translation and introduction, 2018.
- Martin Heidegger, Introduction to the Metaphysics, translation, 2017.
- William Cittick, Divine love, translation, 2016.
- Henry Corbin, Temple and Contemplation, translation, introduction, and glosses, 2016.
- Henry Corbin, Corpus spiritual et terre celeste, translation, introduction, and glosses, 2016.
- Henry Corbin, Cyclical time and Ismaili gnosis, translation, introduction and glosses, 2015.
- P. Edwards and D. Borchert (Chief Editors), Encyclopedia of Ethics, translation and introduction, 2013.
- Kimiae Kherad (The Alchemy of the Intellect), 2013.
- S.H. Nasr, Knowledge and The Sacred, translation, 2009.
- S.H. Nasr, The Garden of Truth, translation and introduction, 2009.
- Henry Corbin, Avicenna and the Visionary Recitals, translation, introduction, and glosses, 2008.
- S.H. Nasr, Religion and The Order of Nature, translation, 2006.
- Alan R. White, The Methods of Metaphysics, translation, 2006.
- Muhammad Rida al-Muzaffar, Al-Mantiq, translation from Arabic, 2006.
- Henry Corbin, Creative Imagination in Ibn Arabi's Sufism, translation, introduction, and glosses, 2005.
- Immanuel Kant, The Critique of Practical Reason, translation, 2005.
- S.H. Nasr, Islam and the Plight of Modern Man, translation, 2004.
- Honar va Maanaviat (Art and Spirituality), 2004.
- S.H. Nasr, Ideals and Realities of Islam, translation, 2003.
- David R. Ferguson, Rudolf Bultmann, translation, 2003.
- Charles Taliaferro, The Contemporary Philosophy of Religion, translation, 2003.
- William Frankena, Ethics, translation, 2002.
- Alasdair McIntyre, A Short History of Ethics, translation, 2000.

== Articles ==
- “Celestial Souls in Ibn-Sina's Cosmology and Their Similarity with Human Souls”, in Philosophy-Theological Research (The Quarterly Journal of Qom University), No.42
- “The Position of Shia Spirituality in the Dialogue between Islam and Christianity in Henry Corbin's Thought”, in Philosophy-Theological Research (The Quarterly Journal of Qom University), No.71
- “Immortality of the Soul: A Reflection on Plato's Phaedo”, in Philosophy Theological Research (The Quarterly Journal of Qom University), No.28
- “Omniscience and Divine Co-eternality”, in Philosophy of Religion Research (Imam Sadiq University), No.28
- Rahmati, Insha-Allah; Heidarian, Leili (2020). "ریاست معنوی در فلسفۀ سیاسی ایرانی از منظر هانری کربن". پژوهش های معرفت شناختی (آفاق حکمت). 1 (2): 117–136. doi:10.22059/JPQ.2020.238238.1007135.
- "The Apriori in Otto’s Notion of Religion and Mysticism ”, in Philosophy of Religion Research (Imam Sadiq University), No.31
- “Divine Will and Autonomy of Ethics”, in Journal of Religious Thought", (Shiraz University), No.17
- “Quranic Christology and Monotheistic Spirituality”, in Quran va Hadith, No.14
- “Negative Theology in Qadi Said Qummi”, in Kheradname ye Sadra, No.86
- “Collision of Omniscience, and Human and Divine Freedom”, in Bi-annual Journal of The Epistemological Research (Islamic Azad University), Vol.3, No.8
- Rahmati, Insha-Allah; Sarvand, Majid (2020). "ریاست معنوی در فلسفۀ سیاسی ایرانی از منظر هانری کربن". Political Quarterly. 50 (1): 85–109. doi:10.22059/JPQ.2020.238238.1007135.
- “Epistemology of Prophetic Theosophy in Avicenna's Metaphysics”, in The Epistemological Research (Islamic Azad University), No.11
- "The Ontological Argument, With a View to The Islamic Philosophy", in Borhan wa Erfan (Islamic Azad University), No.8
- “Pascal on Faith and Rationality”, in Borhan wa Erfan (Islamic Azad University), No.9,10
- “Millenarianism in Ancient Iranian Religions and Ikhavan al-Safa’s theory of Prophetic Cycles: A Comparative Study”, in Biannual Journal of Religious Studies (Islamic Azad University), Vol.6, No.12
- “Traditional Art and Secular Art from The Viewpoint of Frithjof Schuon”, in Pazhouhesh Nameh-e Farhangestan-e Honar (Research Journal of the Iranian Academy of Arts), Vol.3, No.15
- “The Eight Climate”, in The Mirror of Wisdom (Islamic Azad University)
- “The Permanent Hermeneutics and the Necessity for a Living Imam”, in Safine (The Quarterly Specialized Studies on the Quran and Hadith), Vol.4, No.14
- “Determinism and Free Will”, in Biography & Academic Life of Dr. Gholamhossein Ebrahimi Dinani (Society for the Apprehension of Cultural Works and Dignitaries)
- “The Function of Imagination in the Explanation of Spiritual Reality”, in the Processing of the second Conference on Artistic Imagination, No.14

== Awards and honors ==
- He was nominated as the "Translator of the Year" by the Ministry of Islamic Guidance.
- His translation of the books entitled: "Avicenna and the Visionary Recital", "Iranian Islam", "Encyclopedia of Ethics, Temple and Contemplation” and “Knowledge and the Sacred” became the best-known philosophical book of I. R. of Iran in various years.

== See also ==
- Ethics
- Iranian philosophy
- Islamic philosophy
- Philosophy of Religion
- Traditionalist School (perennialism)
- Henry Corbin
- Seyyed Hossein Nasr
- William Chittick
- Immanuel Kant
- Paul Edwards
- Martin Heidegger
- Rudolf Otto
- Avicenna
- Shahab al-Din Suhrawardi
- Mulla Sadra
- Ibn Arabi
