= Paul Feyerabend =

Austrian philosopher of science (1924–1994)

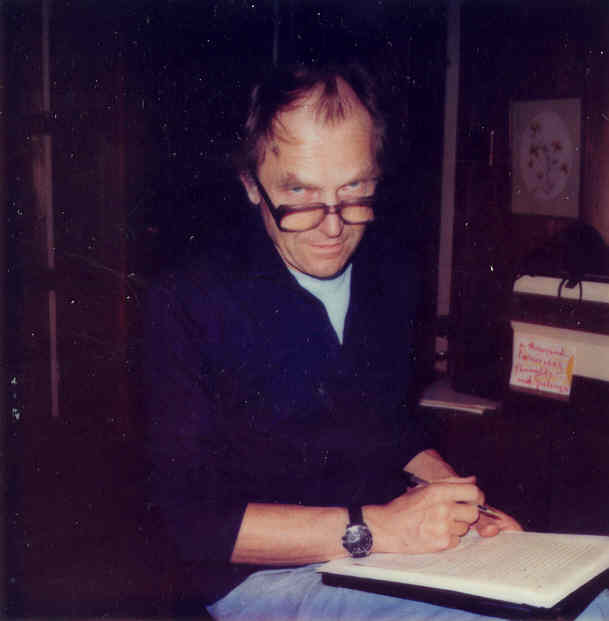
- Feyerabend at Berkeley
- Born: Paul Karl Feyerabend; January 13, 1924; Vienna, Austria
- Died: February 11, 1994 (aged 70); Genolier, Vaud, Switzerland

Education
- Education: University of Vienna (PhD, 1951)
- Thesis: Zur Theorie der Basissätze (A Theory of Basic Statements) (1951)
- Doctoral advisor: Victor Kraft
- Other advisors: Karl Popper; Arthur Pap

Philosophical work
- Era: 20th-century philosophy
- Region: Western philosophy
- School: Analytic philosophy
- Institutions: University of California, Berkeley; ETH Zurich
- Doctoral students: Nancey Murphy
- Main interests: Philosophy of science, epistemology, political philosophy, ancient philosophy, philosophy of mind
- Notable ideas: Epistemological anarchism Criticism of falsificationism Incommensurability; Eliminative materialism

Paul Karl Feyerabend (/ˈfaɪərɑːbənd/; FY-ur-ah-bent; German: [ˈfaɪɐˌʔaːbm̩t]; January 13, 1924 – February 11, 1994) was an Austrian philosopher best known for his work in philosophy of science. He started his academic career as lecturer in philosophy of science at the University of Bristol (1955–1958); afterward, he moved to the University of California, Berkeley, where he taught for three decades (1958–1989). At various points in his life, he held joint appointments at the University College London (1967–1970), the London School of Economics (1967), the FU Berlin (1968), Yale University (1969), the University of Auckland (1972, 1975), the University of Sussex (1974), and the ETH Zurich (1980–1990). He gave lectures and lecture series at the University of Minnesota (1958–1962), Stanford University (1967), the University of Kassel (1977), and the University of Trento (1992).

Feyerabend's most famous work is Against Method (1975), wherein he argues that there are no universally valid methodological rules for scientific inquiry. He also wrote on topics related to the politics of science in several essays and in his book Science in a Free Society (1978). Feyerabend's later works include Wissenschaft als Kunst (Science as Art) (1984), Farewell to Reason (1987), Three Dialogues on Knowledge (1991), and Conquest of Abundance (released posthumously in 1999), which collect essays from the 1970s until Feyerabend's death. The uncompleted draft of an earlier work was released posthumously in 2009 as Naturphilosophie and translated to English in 2016 as Philosophy of Nature. This work contains Feyerabend's reconstruction of the history of natural philosophy from the Homeric period until the mid-20th century. In these works and others, Feyerabend wrote about numerous issues at the interface between history and philosophy of science and ethics, ancient philosophy, philosophy of art, political philosophy, medicine, and physics. His final work was an autobiography, Killing Time, which he completed on his deathbed. Feyerabend's extensive correspondence and other materials from his Nachlass continue to be published.

Feyerabend is recognized as one of the most important 20th-century philosophers of science. In a 2010 poll, he was ranked as the 8th-most significant philosopher of science. He is often mentioned alongside Thomas Kuhn, Imre Lakatos, and N. R. Hanson as a crucial figure in the historical turn in philosophy of science, and his work on scientific pluralism has been markedly influential on the Stanford School and on much contemporary philosophy of science. Feyerabend was also a significant figure in the sociology of scientific knowledge. His lectures were extremely well-attended, attracting international attention. His multifaceted personality is eloquently summarized in his obituary by Ian Hacking: "Humanists, in my old-fashioned sense, need to be part of both arts and sciences. Paul Feyerabend was a humanist. He was also fun."

In line with this humanistic interpretation and the concerns apparent in his later work, the Paul K. Feyerabend Foundation was founded in 2006 in his honour. The Foundation "promotes the empowerment and wellbeing of disadvantaged human communities. By strengthening intra and inter-community solidarity, it strives to improve local capacities, promote the respect of human rights, and sustain cultural and biological diversity." In 1970, the Loyola University of Chicago awarded Feyerabend a Doctor of Humane Letters Degree honoris causa. Asteroid (22356) Feyerabend is named after him.

== Biography ==
=== Early life ===
Feyerabend was born in 1924 in Vienna, Austria. His paternal grandfather was the illegitimate child of a housekeeper, Helena Feierabend, who introduced the 'y' into 'Feyerabend.' His father, originally from Carinthia, was an officer in the merchant marine in World War I in Istria and a civil servant in Vienna until he died due to complications from a stroke. His mother's family came from Stockerau. She was a seamstress and died on July 29, 1943 by suicide. The family lived in a working-class neighborhood (Wolfganggasse) where gypsy musicians, over-the-top relatives, illusionists, sudden accidents, and heated quarrels were part of everyday life. In his autobiography Feyerabend remembers a childhood in which magic and mysterious events were separated by dreary 'commonplace' only by a slight change of perspective — a theme later found in his work.

Raised Catholic, Feyerabend attended the Realgymnasium, where he excelled as a Vorzugsschüler (top student), especially in physics and mathematics. At 13 he built, with his father, his own telescope, which allowed him to become an observer for the Swiss Institute of Solar Research. He was inspired by his teacher Oswald Thomas and developed a reputation as knowing more than the teachers. A voracious reader, especially of mystery and adventure novels and plays, Feyerabend casually stumbled onto philosophy. Works by Plato, Descartes, and Büchner awoke his interest in the dramatic power of argument. He later encountered philosophy of science through the works of Mach, Eddington, and Dingler and was fascinated by Nietzsche's Thus Spoke Zarathustra and his depiction of the "lonely man." During high school, Feyerabend also began his lifelong interest in singing. He sang in a choir under Leo Lehner and was later introduced to opera and inspired by performances from George Oeggl and Hans Hotter. He later trained formally under the tutelage of Adolf Vogel and others.

=== Nazi Occupation of Austria and World War II ===
Feyerabend's parents were both welcoming of the Anschluss. His mother was entranced by Hitler's voice and demeanor and his father was similarly impressed by Hitler's charisma and later joined the Nazi Party. Feyerabend himself was unmoved by the Anschluss or World War II, which he saw as an inconvenience that got in the way of reading and astronomy. Feyerabend was in the Hitler Youth as a part of compulsory policies and sometimes rebelled, praising the British or claiming he had to leave a meeting to attend Mass, and sometimes conformed, bringing in members who missed meetings. After the war, Feyerabend recounts that he "did not accept the aims of Nazism" and that he "hardly knew what they were." Later, he wondered why he did not see the occupation and war as moral problems. They were just "inconveniences" and his reactions—recalled with uncommon honesty—were suggested by accidental moods and circumstances rather than by a "well defined outlook".

“Looking back, I notice a rather unstable combination of contrariness and a tendency to conform. A critical judgement or a feeling of unease could be silenced or turned into its opposite by an almost imperceptible counter-force. It was like a fragile cloud dispersed by heat. On other occasions I would not listen to reason or Nazi common sense and would cling to unpopular ideas. This ambivalence (which survived for many years and was weakened only recently) seems to have been connected with my ambivalence towards people: I wanted to be close to them, but I also wanted to be left alone.”

— From his autobiography, Killing Time, p 40-41

After graduating from high school, in April 1942 Feyerabend was drafted into the German Arbeitsdienst (working service), received basic training in Pirmasens, and was assigned to a unit in Quelerne en Bas, near Brest. He described the work he did during that period as monotonous: "we moved around in the countryside, dug ditches, and filled them up again." After a short leave he volunteered for officer school. In his autobiography he writes that he hoped the war would be over by the time he had finished his education as an officer. This turned out not to be the case. From December 1943 on, he served as an officer on the northern part of the Eastern Front, was decorated with an Iron cross, and attained the rank of lieutenant. When the German army started its retreat from the advancing Red Army, Feyerabend was hit by three bullets while directing traffic. One hit him in the spine which left him wheel-chaired for a year and partially paralyzed for the rest of his life. He later learned to walk with a crutch, but was left impotent and plagued by intermittent bouts of severe pain for the rest of his life.

=== Post-WWII, PhD, and early career in England ===
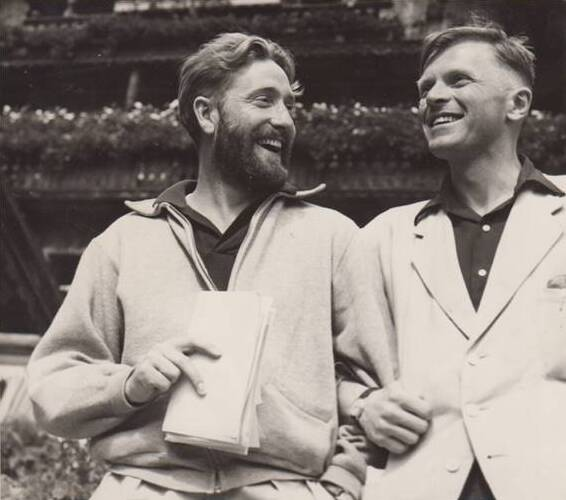
Feyerabend with his friend Roy Edgley

After getting wounded in action, Feyerabend was hospitalized in and around Weimar where he spent more than a year recovering and where he witnessed the end of the war and Soviet occupation. The mayor of Apolda gave him a job in the education sector and he, then still on two crutches, worked in public entertainment including writing speeches, dialogues, and plays. Later, at the music academy in Weimar, he was granted a scholarship and food stamps and took lessons in Italian, harmony, singing, enunciation, and piano. He also joined the Cultural Association for the Democratic Reform of Germany, the only association he ever joined.

As Feyerabend moved back to Vienna, he was permitted to pursue a PhD at the University of Vienna. He originally intended to study physics, astronomy, and mathematics (while continuing to practice singing) but decided to study history and sociology to understand his wartime experiences. He became dissatisfied, however, and soon transferred to physics and studied astronomy, especially observational astronomy and perturbation theory, as well as differential equations, nuclear physics, algebra, and tensor analysis. He took classes with Hans Thirring, Hans Leo Przibram, and Felix Ehrenhaft. He also had a small role in a film directed by G.W. Pabst and joined the Austrian College where he frequented their speaker series in Alpbach. Here, in 1948, Feyerabend met Karl Popper who made a positive impression on him. He was also influenced by the Marxist playwright Bertolt Brecht, who invited him to be his assistant at the East Berlin State Opera, but Feyerabend turned down the offer. A possible reason was Feyerabend's instinctive aversion to group thinking, which, for instance, made him staunchly refuse joining any Marxist Leninist organizations despite having friends there and despite voting communist in the early Austrian election.

In Vienna, Feyerabend organized the Kraft Circle, where students and faculty discussed scientific theories (he recalled five meetings about non-Einsteinian interpretations of the Lorentz transformations) and often focused on the problem of the existence of the external world. There, he also met Elizabeth Anscombe who, in turn, led Feyerabend to meet Ludwig Wittgenstein. In the years between 1949 and 1952, Feyerabend traveled in Europe and exchanged with philosophers and scientists, including Niels Bohr. He also married his first wife (Jacqueline, 'to be able to travel together and share hotel rooms'), divorced, and became involved in various romantic affairs, despite his physical impotence. Cycles of amorous excitement, dependence, isolation, and renewed dependence characterized his relations with women for a good part of his life. He drew great pleasure from opera, which he could attend even five days a week, and from singing (he resumed his lessons even if his crutch excluded an operatic career). Attending opera and singing (he had an excellent tenor voice) remained constant passions throughout his life. In 1951, he earned his doctorate with a thesis on basic statements (Zur Theorie der Basissätze) under Victor Kraft's supervision.

In 1952-53, thanks to a British Council scholarship, he continued his studies at the London School of Economics where he focused on Bohm's and von Neumann's work in quantum mechanics and on Wittgenstein's later works, including Remarks on the Foundations of Mathematics and Philosophical Investigations. He also attended Popper's lectures on logic and scientific method and became convinced that induction was irrational. During this time, he developed an early version of his theory of incommensurability, which he thought was a triviality, and was encouraged to develop it further by Popper, H.L.A. Hart, Peter Geach, and Georg Henrik von Wright. He met many others including J.O. Wisdom, A. I. Sabra, Joseph Agassi, and Martin Buber. After his return to Vienna, Feyerabend met often with Viktor Frankl and with Arthur Pap, who offered him a position as his research assistant at the University of Vienna. Thanks to Pap, he became acquainted with Herbert Feigl. During this time, Feyerabend worked on the German translation of Popper's The Open Society and Its Enemies and often met with Herbert Feigl and Philipp Frank. Franck argued that Aristotle was a better empiricist than Copernicus, an argument that became influential on Feyerabend's primary case study in Against Method.

In 1955, Feyerabend successfully applied for a lectureship at the University of Bristol with letters of reference from Karl Popper and Erwin Schrödinger and started his academic career. In 1956, he met Mary O’Neill, who became his second wife – another passionate love affair that soon ended in separation. After presenting a paper on the measurement problem at the 1957 symposium of the Colston Research Society in Bristol, Feyerabend was invited to the University of Minnesota by Michael Scriven. There, he exchanged with Herbert Feigl, Ernst Nagel, Wilfred Sellars, Hilary Putnam, and Adolf Grünbaum. Soon afterwards, he met Gilbert Ryle who said of Feyerabend that he was "clever and mischievous like a barrel of monkeys."

=== Berkeley, Zurich and retirement ===
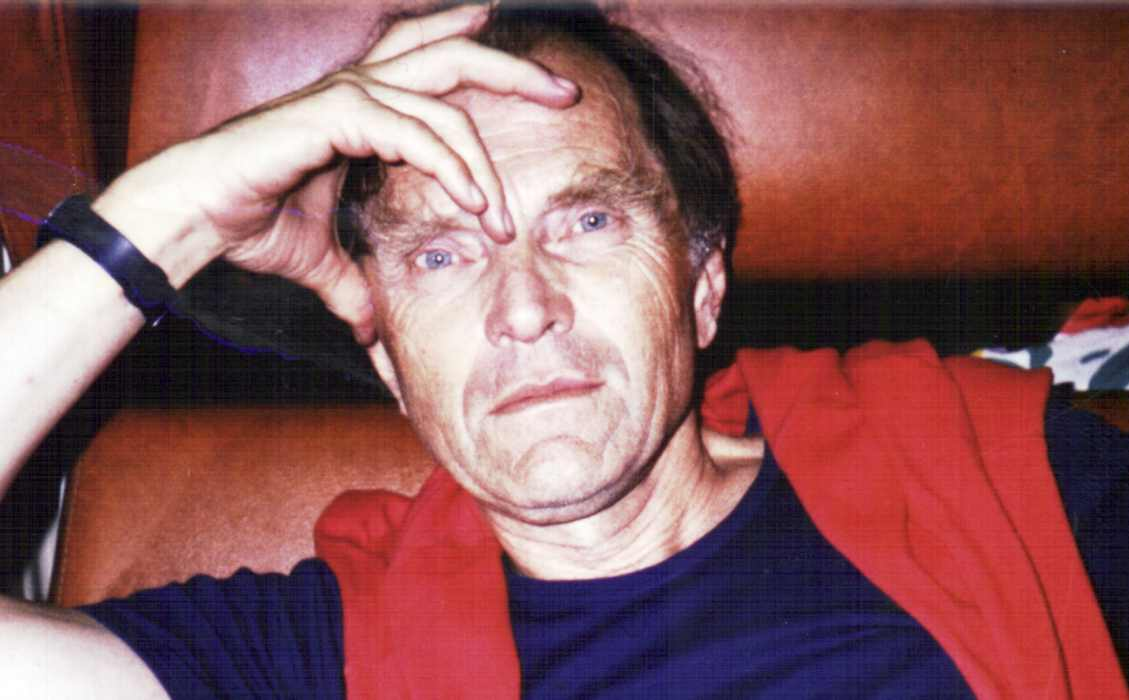
Feyerabend later in life. Photograph by Grazia Borrini-Feyerabend

Feyerabend's primary academic appointment was at the University of California at Berkeley. While he was hired there in 1958, he spent part of his first years in the United States at the University of Minnesota, working closely with Herbert Feigl and Paul Meehl after rejecting a job offer from Cornell University. In California, he met and befriended Rudolf Carnap, whom he described as a "wonderful person, gentle, understanding, not at all as dry as would appear from some (not all) of his writings", and Alfred Tarski, among others. He also married for a third time. At Berkeley, Feyerabend mostly lectured on general philosophy and philosophy of science. During the student revolution, he also lectured on revolutionaries (Lenin, Mao, Mill, and Cohn-Bendit). He often invited students and outsiders, including Lenny Bruce and Malcolm X, to guest lecture on a variety of issues including gay rights, racism, and witchcraft. He supported the students but did not support student strikes. John Searle attempted to get Feyerabend fired from his position for hosting lectures off-campus.

As Feyerabend was highly marketable in academia and personally restless, he kept accepting and leaving university appointments while holding more 'stable' positions in Berkeley and London. For instance, starting in 1968, he spent two terms at Yale, which he describes as boring, feeling that most there did not have "ideas of their own." There, however, he did meet Jeffrey Bub, and the two became friends. He remembered attempting to give everyone in graduate seminars 'As', which was strongly resisted by the students at Yale. He also asked students in his undergraduate classes to build something useful, like furniture or short films, rather than term papers or exams. In the same years, he accepted a new chair in philosophy of science in Berlin and a professorship in Auckland (New Zealand). In Berlin, he faced a 'problem' as he was assigned two secretaries, fourteen assistants and an impressive office with antique furniture and an anteroom, which "gave him the willies":

“...I wrote and mailed my own letters, including official ones ... never had a mailing list or any list of my publications, and I threw away most of the offprints that were sent to me... That took me out of the academic landscape, but it also simplified my life. ... [In Berlin] the secretaries were soon used by my less independent colleagues and by the assistants. "Look," I said to them, "I was given 80,000 marks for starting a new library; go and buy all the books you want and run as many seminars as you like. Don't ask me-- be independent!". Most of the assistants were revolutionaries, and two of them were sought by the police. Yet, they didn't buy Che Guevara or Mao, or Lenin; they bought books on logic! "We have to learn how to think," they said, as if logic has anything to do with that.

— From his autobiography, Killing Time, p 132

While teaching at the London School of Economics, Imre Lakatos often 'jumped in' during Feyerabend's lectures and started defending rationalist arguments. The two "differed in outlook, character and ambitions" but became very close friends. They often met at Lakatos' luxurious house in Turner Woods, which included an impressive library. Lakatos had bought the house for representation purposes and Feyerabend often made gentle fun of it, choosing to help Lakatos' wife to wash dishes after dinner rather than engaging in scholarly debates with 'important guests' in the library. "Don't worry" – Imre would say to his guests – "Paul is an anarchist". Lakatos and Feyerabend planned to write a dialogue volume in which Lakatos would defend a rationalist view of science and Feyerabend would attack it. This planned joint publication was put to an end by Lakatos's sudden death in 1974. Feyerabend was devastated by it.

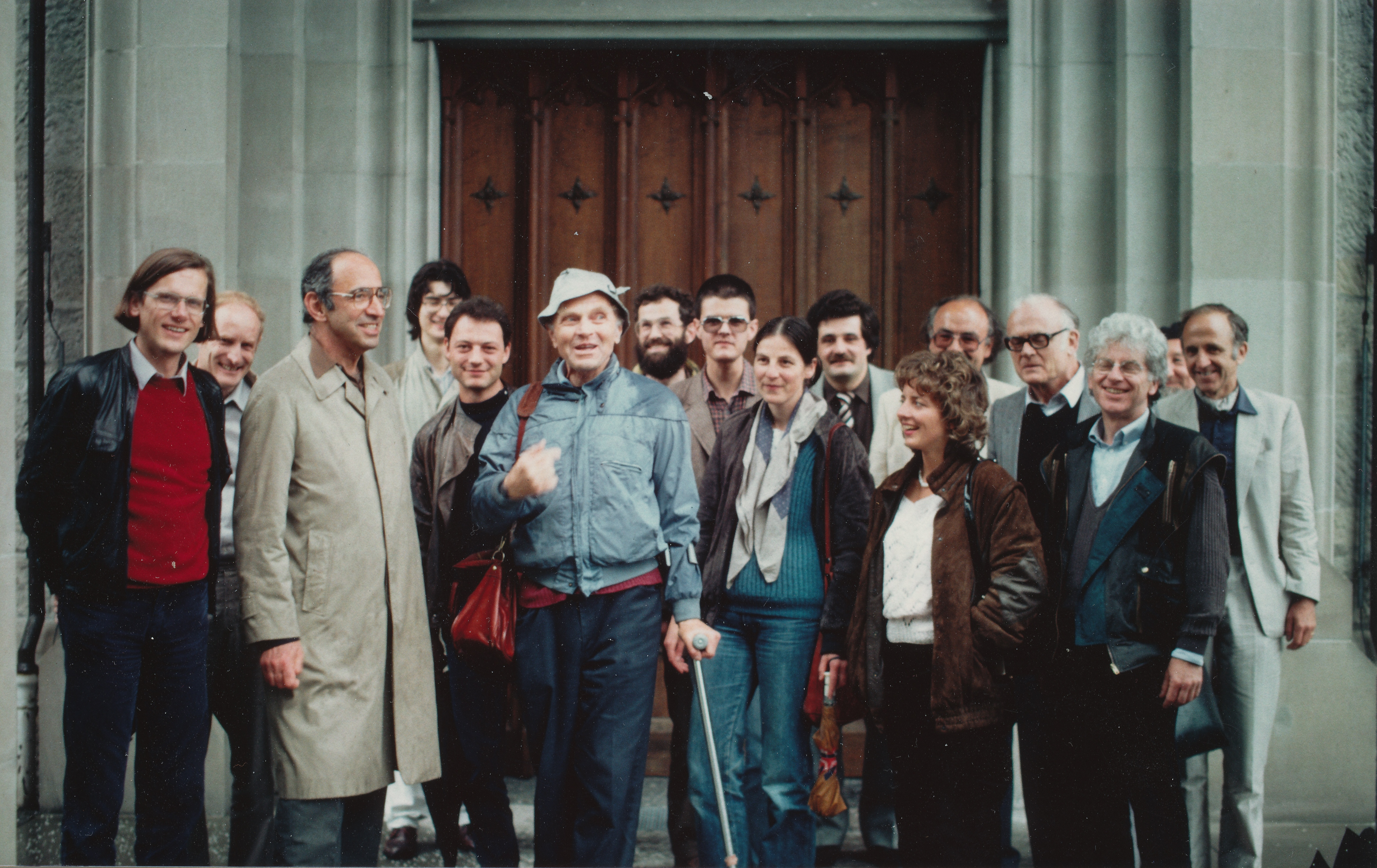
Feyerabend, Kuhn, Hoyningen-Huene and colleagues after a seminar at ETH Zurich

Feyerabend had become more and more aware of the limitation of theories – no matter how well conceived – compared with the detailed, idiosyncratic issues encountered in the course of scientific practice. The "poverty of abstract philosophical reasoning" became one of the "feelings" that motivated him to pull together the collage of observations and ideas that he had conceived for the project with Imre Lakatos, whose first edition was published in 1975 as Against Method. Feyerabend added to it some outrageous passages and terms, including about an 'anarchistic theory of knowledge', for the sake of provocation and in memory of Imre. He mostly wanted to encourage attention to scientific practice and common sense rather than to the empty 'clarifications' of logicians, but his views were not appreciated by the intellectuals who were then directing traffic in the philosophical community, who tended to isolate him. Against Method also suggested that "approaches not tied to scientific institutions" may have value, and that scientists should work under the control of the larger public-- views not appreciated by all scientists either. Some gave him the dubious fame of 'worst enemy of science'. Moreover, Feyerabend was aware that "scientific jargon" – read literally, word for word, could reveal not only "nonsense", as found out by John Austin, "but also inhumanity. With the Dadaists Feyerabend realized that "the language of philosophers, politicians, theologians" had similarities with "brute in-articulations". He exposed that by "avoiding scholarly ways of presenting a view" and using "common locutions and the language of show business and pulp instead".

In his autobiography, Feyerabend describes how the community of 'intellectuals' seemed to "...take a slight interest in me, lift me up to his own eye level, took a brief look at me, and drop me again. After making me appear more important than I ever thought I was, it enumerated my shortcomings and put me back on my place." This treatment left him all but indifferent. During the years following the publication of Against Method and the critical reviews that followed – some of which as scathing as superficial – he suffered from bouts of ill health and depression. While medical doctors could not do anything for him, some help came from alternative therapies (e.g., Chinese herbal medicines, acupuncture, diet, massage). He also kept moving among academic appointments (Auckland, Brighton, Kassel).

Towards the end of the 1970s, Feyerabend was assigned a position as Professor of Philosophy at the Eidgenössische Technische Hochschule (ETH) in Zurich. There, he ran well attended lectures, including on the Theaetetus, Timeaus, and Aristotle's physics as well as public debates and seminars for the non-academic public. Through the 1980s, he enjoyed alternating between posts at ETH Zurich and UC Berkeley. In 1983, he also met Grazia Borrini, who would become his fourth and final wife. She heard of Feyerabend from train passengers in Europe and attended his seminar in Berkeley. They were married in 1989, when they both decided to try to have children, for which they needed medical assistance due to Feyerabend's war injury. Feyerabend claims that he finally understood the meaning of love because of Grazia. This had a dramatic impact on his worldview ("Today it seems to me that love and friendship play a central role and that without them even the noblest achievements and the most fundamental principles remain pale, empty and dangerous"). It is also in those years that he developed what he describes as "...a trace of a moral character".

“...a moral character cannot be created by argument, 'education' or an act of will. It cannot be created by any kind of planned action, whether scientific, political, moral or religious. Like true love, it is a gift, not an achievement. It depends on accidents, such as parental affection, some kind of stability, friendship, and-- following therefrom-- on a delicate balance between self-confidence and concern for others. We can create conditions that favor the balance; we cannot create the balance itself. Guilt, responsibility, obligation-- these ideas make sense when the balance is given. They are empty words, even obstacles, when it is lacking.”

— From his autobiography, Killing Time, p 174

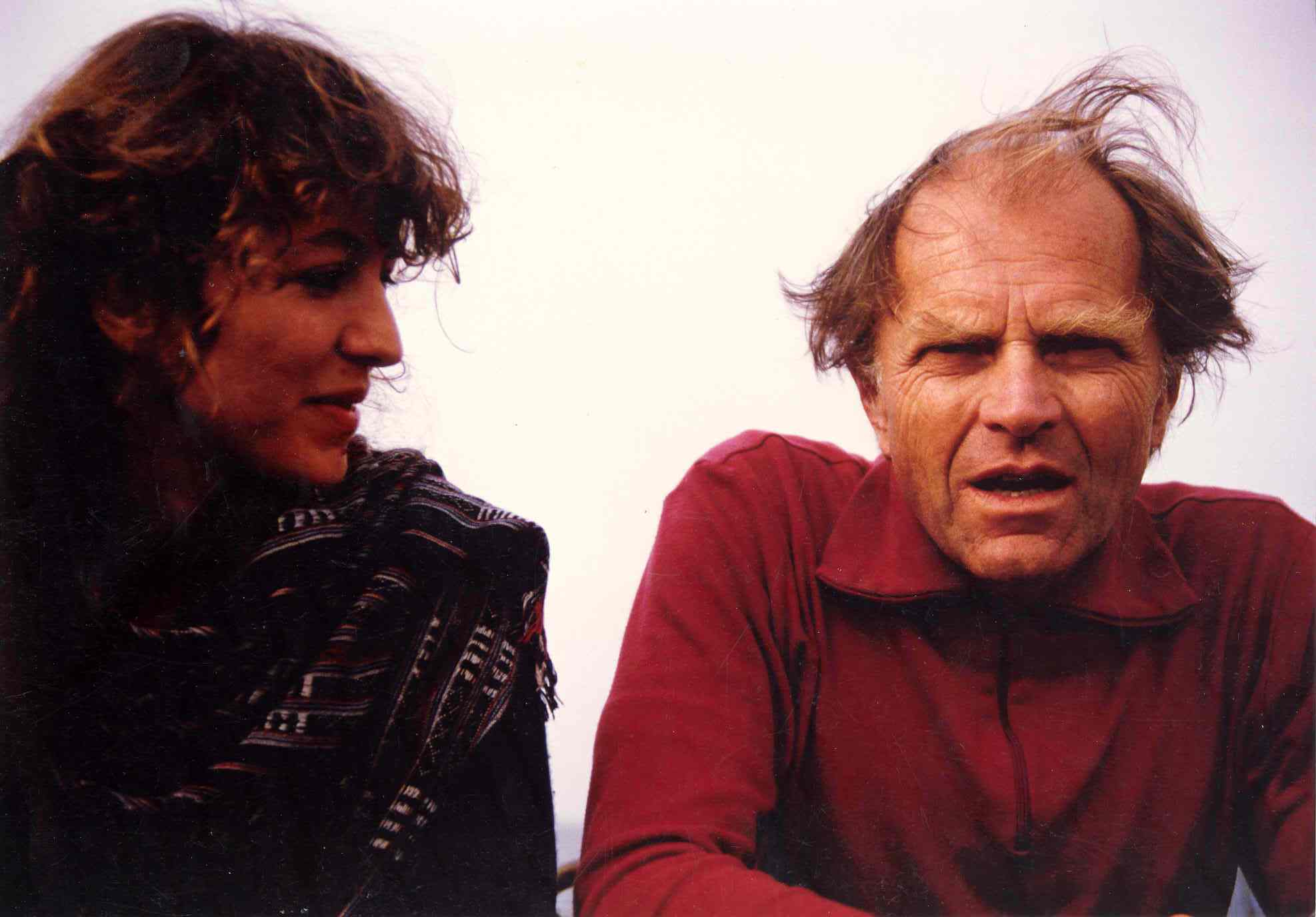
Paul Feyerabend and Grazia Borrini Feyerabend (Crete, 1980s)

In 1989, Feyerabend voluntarily left Berkeley for good. After his mandatory retirement also from Zurich, in 1990, he continued to give lectures, including often in Italy, published papers and book reviews for Common Knowledge, and worked on his posthumously released Conquest of Abundance and on his autobiography-- the volumes for which writing became for him "a 'pleasurable activity', almost like composing a work of art". He remained based in Meilen, in Switzerland, but often spent time with his wife in Rome. After a short period of suffering from an inoperable brain tumor, he died in 1994 at the Genolier Clinic, overlooking Lake Geneva, Switzerland. He had just turned 70. He is buried in his family grave, in Vienna.

== Thought ==
=== Philosophy of science ===
==== Kraft Circle, hidden variables, and no-go proofs ====
During Feyerabend's PhD, he retrospectively describes himself as a "raving positivist." He was the head organizer of the 'Kraft circle' which discussed many issues in the foundations of physics and on the nature of basic statements, which was the topic of his dissertation. In 1948, Feyerabend wrote a short paper in response to Schrödinger's paper "On the Peculiarity of the Scientific Worldview." Here, Feyerabend argued that Schrödinger's demand that scientific theories present are Anschaulich (i.e., intuitively visualizable) is too restrictive. Using the example of the development of Bohr's atomic theory, he claims that theories that are originally unvisualizable develop new ways of making phenomena visualizable. His unpublished paper, "Philosophers and the Physicists," argues for a naturalistic understanding of philosophy where philosophy is "petrified" without physics and physics is "liable to become dogmatic" without philosophy.

Feyerabend's early career is also defined by a focus on technical issues within the philosophy of quantum mechanics. Feyerabend argues that von Neumann's 'no-go' proof only shows that the Copenhagen interpretation is consistent with the fundamental theorems of quantum mechanics but it does not logically follow from them. Therefore, causal theories of quantum mechanics (like Bohmian mechanics) are not logically ruled out by von Neumann's proof. After meeting David Bohm in 1957, Feyerabend became an outspoken defender of Bohm's interpretation and argued that hidden variable approaches to quantum mechanics should be pursued to increase the testability of the Copenhagen Interpretation.

Feyerabend also provided his own solution to the measurement problem in 1957, although he soon came to abandon this solution. He tries to show that von Neumann's measurement scheme can be made consistent without the collapse postulate. His solution anticipates later developments of decoherence theory.

==== Empiricism, pluralism, and incommensurability ====
Much of Feyerabend's work from the late 1950s until the late 1960s was devoted to methodological issues in science. Specifically, Feyerabend offers several criticisms of empiricism and offers his own brand of theoretical pluralism. One such criticism concerns the distinction between observational and theoretical terms. If an observational term is understood as one whose acceptance can be determined by immediate perception, then what counts as 'observational' or 'theoretical' changes throughout history as our patterns of habituation change and our ability to directly perceive entities evolve. On another definition, observation terms are those that can be known directly and with certainty whereas theoretical terms are hypothetical. Feyerabend argues that all statements are hypothetical, since the act of observation requires theories to justify its veridicality.

To replace empiricism, Feyerabend advances theoretical pluralism as a methodological rule for scientific progress. On this view, proliferating new theories increases the testability of previous theories that might be well-established by observations. This is because some tests cannot be unearthed without the invention of an alternative theory. One example Feyerabend uses repeatedly is Brownian motion which was not a test of the second law of classical thermodynamics. To become a test, it must be first explained by an alternative theory – namely, Einstein's kinetic theory of gases – which formally contradicts the accepted theory. By proliferating new theories, we increase the number of indirect tests of our theories. This makes theoretical pluralism central to Feyerabend's conception of scientific method.

Eventually, Feyerabend's pluralism incorporates what he calls the "principle of tenacity." The principle of tenacity allows scientists to pursue theories regardless of the problems it may possess. Examples of problems might include recalcitrant evidence, theoretical paradoxes, mathematical complexity, or inconsistency with neighboring theories. Feyerabend learned of this idea from Kuhn, who argued that without tenacity all theories would have been prematurely abandoned. This principle complements the "principle of proliferation", which admonishes us to invent as many theories as possible, so that those invented theories can become plausible rivals.

In his "Empiricism, Reduction, and Experience" (1962), Feyerabend outlines his theory of incommensurability. His theory appears in the same year as Thomas Kuhn's discussion of incommensurability in The Structure of Scientific Revolutions, but the two were developed independently. According to Feyerabend, some instances of theory change in the history of science do not involve a successor theory that retains its predecessor as a limiting case. In other words, scientific progress does not always involve producing a theory that is a generalization of the previous theory. This is because the successor theory is formally inconsistent with the previous theory attempting to explain the same domain of phenomena. Moreover, the two theories do not share the same empirical content and, therefore, cannot be compared by the same set of observation statements. For example, Buridan's impetus principle has no analogue in classical mechanics. The closest analogue would be momentum, but the two notions are qualitatively distinct (impetus causes motion whereas momentum is the result of motion). Furthermore, Feyerabend claims that there can be no 'parallel notion' of impetus that is explicable within classical mechanics. Any parallel notion that gives non-zero values must assume that inertial movements happen in a resisting medium, which is inconsistent with the assumption in classical mechanics that inertial motion happens in empty space. Therefore, "the concept of impetus, as fixed by the usage established in the impetus theory, cannot be defined in a reasonable way within Newton's theory [since] the usage involves laws... which are inconsistent with Newtonian physics." In response to criticisms of Feyerabend's position, he clarifies that there are other ways in which theories can be compared such as comparing the structures of infinite sets of elements to detect isomorphisms, comparing "local grammars", or building a model of a theory within its alternative. Incommensurability, however, only arises if scientists make the choice to interpret theories realistically. Theories interpreted instrumentally cannot be incommensurable, on Feyerabend's view.

Feyerabend's pluralism is supported by what he calls the 'pragmatic theory of meaning' which he developed in his dissertation. Here, he explicitly resuscitates Neurath and Carnap's physicalism from the 1930s. According to the pragmatic theory of meaning, language consists of two parts. First, there is the characteristic of a language which is a series of noises produced under specific experimental situations. On Feyerabend's views, human observation has no special epistemic status – it is just another kind of measuring apparatus. The characteristic of a language comes from placing observers in the presence of phenomena and instructing them to make specific noises when a phenomenon is sensed. These noises, to become statements (or parts of a language with meaning), must then be interpreted. Interpretation comes from a theory, whose meaning is given is learned though not necessarily through ostension. Once we have an interpreted characteristic, we have statements that can be used to test theories.

==== Departure from Popper ====
Beginning in at least the mid-to-late 1960s, Feyerabend distanced himself from Popper both professionally and intellectually. There is a great amount of controversy about the source and nature of Feyerabend's distancing from Popper. Joseph Agassi claims that it was caused by the student revolutions at Berkeley, which somehow promoted Feyerabend's move towards epistemological anarchism defended in the 1970s. Feyerabend's friend Roy Edgley claims that Feyerabend became distanced from Popper as early as the mid-1950s, when he went to Bristol and then Berkeley and was more influenced by Thomas Kuhn and the Marxism of David Bohm.

Feyerabend's first paper that explicitly repudiates Popper is his two-part paper on Niels Bohr's conception of complementarity. According to Popper, Bohr and his followers accepted complementarity as a consequence of accepting positivism. Popper was the founder of the theory of falsification, which Feyerabend was very critical of. He meant that no science is perfect, and therefore cannot be proven false. Once one repudiates positivism as a philosophical doctrine, Popper claims, one undermines the principle of complementarity. Against this, Feyerabend claims that Bohr was a pluralist who attempting to pursue a realistic interpretation of quantum mechanics (the Bohr-Kramer-Slater conjecture) but abandoned it due to its conflict with the Bothe-Geiger and Compton-Simon experiments. While Feyerabend concedes that many of Bohr's followers (notably, Leon Rosenfeld) accept the principle of complementarity as a philosophical dogma, he contends that Bohr accepted complementarity because it was entangled with an empirically adequate physical theory of microphysics.

==== Anarchist phase ====
In the 1970s, Feyerabend outlines an anarchistic theory of knowledge captured by the slogan 'anything goes'. The phrase 'anything goes' first appears in Feyerabend's paper "Experts in a Free Society" and is more famously proclaimed at the end of the first chapter of Against Method. Feyerabend's epistemological anarchism has been the source of contention amongst scholars. Some claim that epistemological anarchism is not a positive view of scientific method, but the conclusion of a reductio ad absurdum of 'rationalism' (the view that there are universal and unchanging rational rules for scientific reasoning). In Feyerabend's words, "'anything goes' is not a 'principle' I hold... but the terrified exclamation of a rationalist who takes a closer look at history." On this interpretation, Feyerabend aims to show that no methodological view can be held as fixed and universal and therefore the only fixed and universal rule would be "anything goes" which would be useless.

On another interpretation, Feyerabend is claiming that scientists should be unscrupulous opportunists who choose methodological rules that make sense within a given situation. On this view, there are no 'universal' methodological rules but there are local rules of scientific reasoning that should be followed. The use of the phrase 'opportunism' comes from Einstein which denotes an inquirer who changes their beliefs and techniques to fit the situation at hand, rather than pre-judge individual events with well-defined methods or convictions. Feyerabend thinks that this is justified because "no two individuals (no two scientists; no two pieces of apparatus; no two situations) are ever exactly alike and that procedures should therefore be able to vary also."

On a third interpretation, epistemological anarchism is a generalization of his pluralism that he had been developing throughout the 1950s and 1960s. On this view, Feyerabend did not have an anarchist 'turn' but merely generalized his positive philosophy on a more general view. Epistemological anarchism is synonymous with a pluralism without limits, where one can proliferate any theory one wishes and one can tenaciously develop any theory for as long as one wishes. Relatedly, because methods depend on empirical theories for their utility, one can employ any method one wishes in attempt to make novel discoveries. This does not mean that we can believe anything we wish – our beliefs must still stand critical scrutiny – but that scientific inquiry has no intrinsic constraints. The only constraints on scientific practice are those that are materially forced upon scientists. Moreover, Feyerabend also thought that theoretical anarchism was desirable because it was more humanitarian than other systems of organization, by not imposing rigid rules on scientists.

For is it not possible that science as we know it today, or a "search for the truth" in the style of traditional philosophy, will create a monster? Is it not possible that an objective approach that frowns upon personal connections between the entities examined will harm people, turn them into miserable, unfriendly, self-righteous mechanisms without charm or humour? "Is it not possible," asks Kierkegaard, "that my activity as an objective [or critico-rational] observer of nature will weaken my strength as a human being?" I suspect the answer to many of these questions is affirmative and I believe that a reform of the sciences that makes them more anarchic and more subjective (in Kierkegaard's sense) is urgently needed. Against Method (3rd ed.). p. 154.

According to these "existential criteria", methodological rules can be tested by the kinds of lives that they suggest. Feyerabend's position was seen as radical, because it implies that philosophy can neither succeed in providing a general description of science, nor in devising a method for differentiating products of science from non-scientific entities like myths.

To support his position that methodological rules generally do not contribute to scientific success, Feyerabend analyzed counterexamples to the claim that (good) science operates according to the methodological standards invoked by philosophers during Feyerabend's time (namely, inductivism and falsificationism). Starting from episodes in science that are generally regarded as indisputable instances of progress (e.g. the Copernican Revolution), he argued that these episodes violated all common prescriptive rules of science. Moreover, he claimed that applying such rules in these historical situations would actually have prevented scientific revolution. His primary case study is Galileo's hypothesis that the Earth rotates on its axis.

==== Metaphysics of abundance ====
In Feyerabend's later work, especially in Conquest of Abundance, Feyerabend articulates a metaphysical theory in which the universe around us is 'abundant' in the sense that it allows for many realities to be accepted simultaneously. According to Feyerabend, the world, or 'Being' as he calls it, is pliable enough that it can change in accordance with the ways in which we causally engage with the world. In laboratories, for example, scientists do not simply passively observe phenomena but actively intervene to create phenomena with the help of various techniques. This makes entities like 'electrons' or 'genes' real because they can be stably used in a life that one may live. Since our choices about what lives we should live depend on our ethics and our desires, what is 'real' depends on what plays a role in a life that we think is worth living. Feyerabend calls this 'Aristotle's principle' as he believes that Aristotle held the same view.

Being, therefore, is pliable enough to be manipulated and transformed to make many realities that conform to different ways of living in the world. However, not all realities are possible. Being resists our attempts to live with it in certain ways and so not any entity can be declared as 'real' by mere stipulation. In Feyerabend's words,

"I do not assert that any [form of life] will lead to a well-articulated and livable world. The material humans...face must be approached in the right way. It offers resistance; some constructions (some incipient cultures - cargo cults, for example) find no point of attack in it and simply collapse"

This leads Feyerabend to defend the disunity of the world thesis that was articulated by many members of the Stanford School. There are many realities that cannot be reduced to one common 'Reality' because they contain different entities and processes. This makes it possible that some realities contain gods while others are purely materialistic, although Feyerabend thought that materialistic worldviews were deficient in many unspecified ways.

Feyerabend's ideas about a 'conquest of abundance' were first voiced in Farewell to Reason, and the writings of the late 1980s and early 1990s experiment with different ways of expressing the idea, including many of the articles and essays published as part two of Conquest of Abundance. A new theme of this later work is the ineffability of Being, which Feyerabend developed with reference to the work of the Christian mystic, Pseudo-Dionysius the Areopagite. The remarks on ineffability in Conquest of Abundance are too unsystematic to definitively interpret.

=== Philosophy of mind ===
==== Eliminative materialism ====
Along with a number of mid-20th century philosophers (most notably, Wilfrid Sellars, Willard Van Orman Quine, and Richard Rorty), Feyerabend was influential in the development of eliminative materialism, a radical position in the philosophy of mind. On some definitions, eliminative materialism holds that all that exists are material processes and, therefore, our ordinary, common-sense understanding of the mind ("folk psychology") is false. It is described by a modern proponent, Paul Churchland, as follows:

"Eliminative materialism is the thesis that our commonsense conception of psychological phenomena constitutes a radically false theory, a theory so fundamentally defective that both the principles and the ontology of that theory will eventually be displaced, rather than smoothly reduced, by completed neuroscience."

Feyerabend wrote on eliminative materialism in three short papers published in the early sixties. The most common interpretation of these papers is that he was an early forerunner of eliminative materialism. This was a major influence on Patricia and Paul Churchland. As Keeley observes, "[Paul Churchland] has spent much of his career carrying the Feyerabend mantle forward." More recent scholarship claims that Feyerabend was never an eliminative materialist and merely aimed to show that common criticisms against eliminative materialism were methodologically faulty. Specifically, on this interpretation, while Feyerabend defended eliminative materialism from arguments from acquaintance and our intuitive understanding of the mind, he did not explicitly claim that eliminative materialism was true. In doing so, Feyerabend leaves open the possibility that dualism is true but this would have to be shown through scientific arguments rather than philosophical stipulation. In any case, Feyerabend explicitly disavows materialism in his later philosophical writings.

==== Cognitive plasticity ====
Feyerabend briefly entertains and is sympathetic to the hypothesis that there are no innate, cognitive limitations imposed upon the human brain. By this he meant that there were no intrinsic limitations about what we can conceive or understand. Spread out through Feyerabend's writings are passages that suggest that this is confirmed by evidence at the time in the mind-brain sciences. Specifically, he claims that "until now only two or three per cent of the inbuilt circuits of the brain have been utilised. A large variety of [change] is therefore possible." The brain, therefore, is largely plastic and can be adapted in numerous unknown ways. Similarly, he cites Nietzsche's philological findings about changes in perception from classical to Hellenistic Greece. He also criticizes E.O. Wilson's claim that genes limit "human ingenuity" which he claims can only be discovered by acting as if there are no limits to the kinds of lives humans can live. While Feyerabend's remarks on this subject are vague and merely suggestive, they have received uptake and confirmation in more recent research.

=== Political philosophy ===
==== Expertise in a free society ====
Starting from the argument that a historical universal scientific method does not exist, Feyerabend argues that science does not deserve its privileged status in western society. Since scientific points of view do not arise from using a universal method which guarantees high quality conclusions, he thought that science has no intrinsic claim to intellectual authority over other intellectual traditions like religion or myths.

Based on these arguments, Feyerabend defended the idea that science should be separated from the state in the same way that religion and state are separated in a modern secular society He envisioned a free society in which "all traditions have equal rights and equal access to the centres of power." For example, parents should be able to determine the ideological context of their children's education, instead of having limited options because of scientific standards. According to Feyerabend, science should also be subjected to democratic control: not only should the subjects that are investigated by scientists be determined by popular election, scientific assumptions and conclusions should also be supervised by committees of lay people. He thought that citizens should use their own principles when making decisions about these matters. He rejected the view that science is especially "rational" on the grounds that there is no single common "rational" ingredient that unites all the sciences but excludes other modes of thought.

Feyerabend thought that scientific expertise was partially exaggerated by needless uses of jargon and technical language and that many contributions towards science were made by laypeople. Rather than distinguish between "experts" and "laypeople" and privilege the former, Feyerabend distinguishes between "cranks" and "respectable researchers" which is defined by the virtues of inquirers rather than their credentials. In Feyerabend's words,

"The distinction between the crank and the respectable thinker lies in the research that is done once a certain point of view is adopted. The crank usually is content with defending the point of view in its original, undeveloped, metaphysical form, and he is not prepared to test its usefulness in all those cases which seem to favor the opponent, or even admit that there exists a problem. It is this further investigation, the details of it, the knowledge of the difficulties, of the general state of knowledge, the recognition of objections, which distinguishes the 'respectable thinker' from the crank. The original content of his theory does not"

According to this view, we cannot identify who counts as a crank based on the content of their beliefs. Someone who believes in flat earth theory, climate change denial, or astrology – for example – are not necessarily cranks, depending on how they defend those beliefs from criticism.

==== Democracy and science funding ====
Feyerabend thought that science funding agencies should be subject to democratic oversight. On this view, the allocation of funds for research should not be decided by practicing scientists exclusively, as is often the case with peer review. Rather, there should be supervision from taxpayers who determine research priorities. Because of this, Feyerabend defended the Baumann amendment which proposed that there should be Congressional veto power over the National Science Foundation's budget proposals. According to Feyerabend, this follows both from the fact that outsider criticism is necessary for science to flourish and from a right to knowledge which he believed was central to a free society.

=== Ancient philosophy ===
==== Aristotle ====
Feyerabend greatly admired Aristotle's philosophy, largely due to its productivity. According to Feyerabend, Aristotle was an early epitome of naturalistic philosophy whose scientific research was part and parcel with his epistemology. He also claims that Aristotle was one of the most empiricist scientists in history and that his work in physics and mathematics continues to pay dividends after the scientific revolution.

==== Xenophanes and the rise of rationalism ====
In Farewell to Reason, Feyerabend criticizes Popper's claim that Xenophanes, who Feyerabend calls a "conceited bigmouth" with "considerable charm", was the first to engage in rational criticism in his arguments against anthropomorphic gods. According to Feyerabend, Xenophanes' theological writings can only constitute a criticism if the premises would be accepted by his opponents. Otherwise, Xenophanes is merely rejecting the Homeric gods. In the Iliad, and elsewhere, Feyerabend interprets Homer as accepting the view that the universe is subdivided into parts with different laws and qualitative features that do not aggregate into a unified whole. This informs Homer's theology since there can be no coherent knowledge of the whole of the universe, only detailed understandings of isolated parts of the universe. Feyerabend further argues that some thinkers who came after Xenophanes, such as Aeschylus and Sophocles, also rejected Xenophanes' premise that the gods cannot be anthropomorphic. Additionally, Xenophanes represents the beginning of a tyrannical ideology which enforces 'truth' and 'morality' upon all as if there was a single universe that could be captured in a single worldview.

Feyerabend also criticizes Xenophanes' pretensions to have developed a conception of God that has no human features, arguing that Xenophanes' God still engages in human activities (such as thinking or hearing). Moreover, he argues that Xenophanes' God resembles a monster as it becomes more detached from human affairs and is therefore more morally problematic than the Homeric gods.

== Influence ==
=== In philosophy ===
While the immediate academic reception of Feyerabend's most read text, Against Method, was largely negative, Feyerabend is recognized today as one of the most influential philosophers of science of the 20th Century. His arguments for pluralism moved the topic into the mainstream and his use of historical case studies were influential in the development of the History and Philosophy of Science (HPS) as an independent discipline. His arguments against reductionism were also influential on John Dupré, Cliff Hooker, and Alan Chalmers. He was also one of the intellectual precursors of social constructivism and science and technology studies, although he participated little in either field during his lifetime.

=== Outside philosophy ===
Feyerabend's analysis of the Galileo affair, where he claims the Church was "on the right track" for censuring Galileo on moral grounds and were empirically correct, was quoted with approval by Joseph Cardinal Ratzinger (Pope Benedict XVI) in a speech in 1990. In his autobiography, Feyerabend recalls a conversation with Stephen Jay Gould, in 1991, when Gould stated that Against Method's arguments for pluralism motivated him to pursue research on punctuated equilibrium. Feyerabend's work was also influential for several physicists who felt empowered to experiment with approaches different from those of their supervisors as well on many social scientists who were under great pressure to conform to the 'standards' of the natural sciences.

Feyerabend's lectures were extremely popular and well-attended. They were often received positively as entertaining, provocative, and funny. The writer Daniele Bolelli, in his book On the Warrior's Path quotes Feyerabend, highlighting the similarities between his epistemology and Bruce Lee's worldview. Feyerabend's concept of incommensurability was influential in the radical critical approach of Donald Ault in his extensive critical assessment of William Blake's work, especially in Narrative Unbound: Re-Visioning William Blake's The Four Zoas.

For the centennial of Feyerabend's birth, in 2024, there was a series of conferences, workshops, publications, experimental art, song recitals, and theatre pieces planned in honor of his life and works.

== Selected bibliography ==
- Feyerabend's full bibliography: "The Works of P. K. Feyerabend".

=== Books ===
- Against Method: Outline of an Anarchistic Theory of Knowledge (1975). London: Verso Books.ISBN 1-84467-442-8.
  - The first, 1970 edition, is available for download in pdf form from the Minnesota Center for Philosophy of Science. Follow this link path: Minnesota Studies in the Philosophy of Science > 4. Analyses of Theories & Methods of Physics and Psychology. 1970. Editors: M. Radner and S. Winokur > Open Access > Under the "Whoops!" message click 'Download'
  - The third edition, released in 1993, is the most widely available copy.
- Science in a Free Society (1978). London: Verso Books. ISBN 0-8052-7043-4
- Science as Art (1984). Bari: Laterza. ISBN 2-226-13562-6
- Farewell to Reason (1987). London: Verso Books. ISBN 0-86091-184-5, 0860918963
- Three Dialogues on Knowledge (1991). Hoboken: Wiley-Blackwell Press.ISBN 0-631-17917-8, 0631179186
- Killing Time: The Autobiography of Paul Feyerabend (1995). Chicago: University of Chicago Press. ISBN 0-226-24531-4, 0226245322
- Conquest of Abundance: A Tale of Abstraction versus the Richness of Being (1999). Chicago: University of Chicago Press. ISBN 0-226-24533-0, 0226245349
- Philosophy of Nature, Posthumously published (2016). Cambridge: Polity Press. ISBN 978-0-7456-5159-0
  - * Naturphilosophie, Posthumously published (2009). Berlin: Suhrkamp Verlag. Helmut Heit and Eric Oberheim (Eds.). ISBN 3-518-58514-2.

=== Collected volumes ===
- Realism, Rationalism and Scientific Method: Philosophical papers, Volume 1 (1981). P.K. Feyerabend (ed.). Cambridge: Cambridge University Press. ISBN 0-521-22897-2, 0521316421
- Problems of Empiricism: Philosophical Papers, Volume 2 (1981). P.K. Feyerabend (ed.). Cambridge: Cambridge University Press. ISBN 0-521-23964-8, 0521316413
- Knowledge, Science and Relativism: Philosophical Papers, Volume 3 (1999). J. Preston (ed.). Cambridge: Cambridge University Press. ISBN 0-521-64129-2
- Physics and Philosophy: Philosophical Papers, Volume 4 (2015). S. Gattei and J. Agassi (eds.). Cambridge: Cambridge University Press. ISBN 0-521-88130-7

=== Correspondences and lectures ===
- For and Against Method: Including Lakatos's Lectures on Scientific Method and the Lakatos-Feyerabend Correspondence with Imre Lakatos (1999). M. Motterlini (ed.). Chicago: University of Chicago Press. ISBN 0-226-46774-0, 0226467759
- The Tyranny of Science (2011). Cambridge: Polity Press. ISBN 0-7456-5189-5, 0745651909.
- Feyerabend's Formative Years. Volume 1. Feyerabend and Popper: Correspondence and Unpublished Papers (2020). New York: Springer Press. ISBN 978-3-030-00960-1, 978-3030009601

=== Articles ===
- "Linguistic Arguments and Scientific Method". Telos 03 (Spring 1969). New York: Telos Press, Realism, Rationalism and Scientific Method: Philosophical papers, Volume 1 (1981), ISBN 0-521-22897-2, 0521316421
- "How To Defend Society Against Science". Radical Philosophy, no. 11, Summer 03 1975. The Galilean Library, Introductory Readings in the Philosophy of Science edited by E. D. Klemke (1998), ISBN 1-57392-240-4

== See also ==
- Citizen science
- Criticism of science
- Democratization of knowledge
- Epistemological rupture
- Positivism and scientism
- Relativism
- Subjectivism

== Sources ==
- Feyerabend, Paul (1995). Killing Time: The Autobiography of Paul Feyerabend. University of Chicago Press.
- Feyerabend, Paul (1987). Farewell to Reason. Verso Books.
- Feyerabend, Paul (1965). "Reply to Criticism: Comments on Smart, Sellars and Putnam". Proceedings of the Boston Colloquium for the Philosophy of Science.
