= Arthur Pap =

Swiss analytic philosopher (1921–1959)

Arthur Pap (October 1, 1921 – September 7, 1959) was a Swiss-born American philosopher in the school of analytic philosophy. Pap published a number of books regarding analytical philosophy, its function within philosophy, and its impact on society.

== Biography ==
Pap was born October 1, 1921 in Zürich, Switzerland in a Jewish family. His musical talent emerged early and his passion for playing the piano remained throughout his life. In high school, Pap also developed a passion for philosophy and enrolled at Zürich University, where took courses in philosophy and logic from Karl Dürr.

At the start of World War II the family fled to the United States and, in 1941, settled in New York City. Pap entered the Juilliard School of Music where he spent a term before starting his studies at Columbia in the fall of 1941. After obtaining his BA at Columbia University, Pap went to Yale University in 1943 for his master's degree. Ernst Cassirer, who was guest professor at Yale from 1941 to 1944, became his supervisor and provided the original stimulus for Pap's work on hypothetical necessity and the functional a priori. In 1944 Pap went back to Columbia where he completed his PhD thesis under the supervision of Ernest Nagel, who first rejected the manuscript. However, it won the Woodbridge Prize for best philosophical dissertation and was subsequently published as The A Priori in Physical Theory (1946). Pap started teaching at various universities and had the opportunity to meet some leading philosophers, notably Rudolf Carnap, with whom he developed a lasting friendship.

During the first years of his career Pap worked on what is now perhaps his best-known book, Elements of Analytic Philosophy. Taking a break, next he published a translation of Viktor Kraft's Der Wiener Kreis. Kraft recommended him to be a Fulbright lecturer at Vienna University for the academic year 1953–54. Paul Feyerabend became his assistant there and helped in the publication of the lectures.

Returning from Europe, Pap stayed briefly at Lehigh University, then took succession from Carl Hempel as analytic philosopher of science at Yale. There he read courses and held seminars on logic, probability and induction, the philosophy of Russell, and the history of analytic philosophy. In 1957, he edited in collaboration with Paul Edwards the well-known textbook A Modern Introduction to Philosophy. In the summer of 1959, Pap completed a book, An Introduction to the Philosophy of Science, which appeared posthumously. Arthur Pap died on 7 September 1959 in New Haven, Connecticut from kidney disease.

== List of works ==
- The a Priori in Physical Theory. New York: King's Crown Press, 1946.
- Elements of Analytic Philosophy, New York: Macmillan, 1949.
- Analytische Erkenntnistheorie: Kritische Übersicht über die neueste Entwicklung in USA und England. Vienna: Springer, 1955.
- (ed.) A Modern Introduction to Philosophy. New York: Free Press, 1957 (with Paul Edwards)
- Semantics and Necessary Truth: An Inquiry Into the Foundations of Analytic Philosophy. New Haven: Yale University Press, 1958.
- An Introduction to the Philosophy of Science. New York: The Free Press, 1962.
