= Against Method =

1975 book by Paul Feyerabend

Against Method: Outline of an Anarchistic Theory of Knowledge
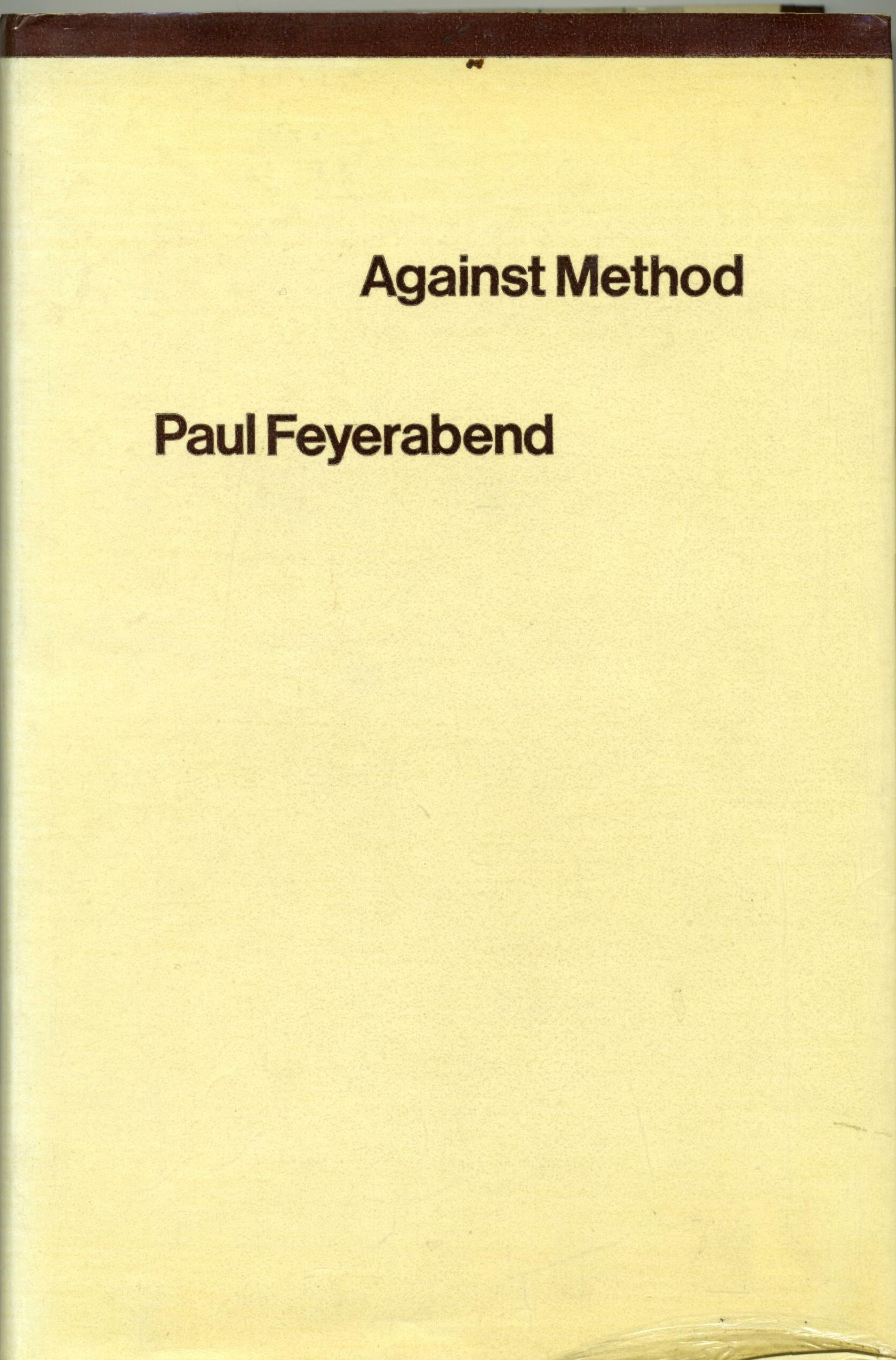
- Cover of the first edition
- Author: Paul Feyerabend
- Language: English
- Subjects: History of science Epistemology
- Publisher: New Left Books
- Publication date: 1975
- Media type: Print (Hardcover and Paperback)
- ISBN: 0-902308-91-2
- Preceded by: N/A
- Followed by: Science in a Free Society

Against Method: Outline of an Anarchistic Theory of Knowledge is a 1975 book by Austrian philosopher of science Paul Feyerabend. The central thesis of the book is that science should become an anarchic enterprise. In the context of the work, the term "anarchy" refers to epistemological anarchy, which does not remain within one single prescriptive scientific method on the grounds that any such method would restrict scientific progress. The work is notable in the history and philosophy of science partially due to its detailed case study of Galileo's hypothesis that the earth rotates on its axis and has since become a staple reading in introductory philosophy of science courses at undergraduate and graduate levels.

Against Method contains many verbatim excerpts from Feyerabend's earlier papers including "Explanation, Reduction, and Empiricism", "How to be a Good Empiricist: A Plea for Tolerance in Matters Epistemological", and "Problems of Empiricism, Part I." Because of this, Feyerabend claims that "[Against Method] is not a book, it is a collage." Later editions of Against Method included passages from Science in a Free Society.

== Publication, Translations, and Editions ==
Feyerabend began writing Against Method in 1968 and it was originally released as a long paper in the Minnesota Studies in the Philosophy of Science series in 1970. At the behest of Imre Lakatos, who originally planned to write For Method in contrast to Against Method but then died, the paper was expanded into a book published in 1975. Lakatos originally encouraged Feyerabend to publish with Cambridge University Press because they would be less concerned with their reputation than smaller presses, but Feyerabend chose to publish with Verso Books (then called New Left Books). Feyerabend came to regret this decision because of their editorial choices. Three more editions were released, in 1988, 1993, and posthumously in 2010. Significant changes were made including removing or adding chapters and appendices with new, updated introductions.

Against Method was an international best seller and, as a result, it has been translated into many languages. This includes:

- German translation by Hermann Vetter (revised and enlarged): Wider den Methodenzwang: Skizze einer anarchistischen Erkenntnistheorie, Suhrkamp: Frankfurt am Main 1976, 443 pp.
- Dutch translation by Hein Kray: In strijd met de methode: Aanzet tot een anarchistische kennistheorie, Meppel: Boom 1977, 375 pp.
- Portuguese translation by Octanny S. da Mota and Leonidas Hegenberg: Contra o método: Esboça de una teoria anárquica da teoria do conhecimento, Livraria Francisco Alves: Rio de Janeiro 1977, 487 pp.
- Swedish translation by Thomas Brante: Ned med metodologin! Skiss till en anarkistisk kunskapsteori, Raben and Sjogren: Zenit 1977, 326 pp.
- French translation by Baudouin Jurdant and Agnès Schlumberger: Contre la methode: Esquisse d'une théorie anarchiste de la connaissance, Seuil: Paris 1979, 350 pp.
- Italian translation by Libero Sosio: Contro il metodo: Abbozzo di una teoria anarchica della conscenza, Feltrinelli: Milan 1979, viii+262 pp.
- Spanish translation by Diego Ribes: Tratado contra el método, Tecnos: Madrid 1981, xvii+319 pp.
- Japanese translation: Hoho eno chosen: Kagakuteki sozo to chi no anakizumu, Shin'yosha: Tokyo 1981, 13+438 pp.
- Turkish translation by Ahmet İnam: Yönteme Hayır: Bir Anarşist Bilgi Kuramının Ana Hatları, Ara: Istanbul 1989, 325 pp.
- Chinese translation by Changzhong Zhou: Shanghai Translation Publishing House: Shanghai 1994, 269 pp.

The 4th edition, released after Feyerabend's death on the 35th anniversary of the initial book release, includes an introduction from Ian Hacking.

== Content ==
=== Epistemological anarchism ===
The primary thesis of Against Method is that there is no such thing as the scientific method and that it is not appropriate to impose a single methodological rule upon scientific practices. Rather, 'anything goes', meaning that scientists should be free to pursue whatever research seems interesting to them. The primary target of Against Method is 'rationalism', or the view that there are rational rules that should guide scientific practices. The German title of Against Method, Wider den Methodenzwang translates more directly to "Against the Forced Constraint of Method" emphasizing that it is the imposition of methodological rules that is rejected rather than the uses of methods altogether. Feyerabend offers two parallel arguments for this position, one conceptual and one historical. The conceptual argument aims to establish that it is always legitimate to violate established forms of scientific practice with the hopes of establishing a new form of scientific rationality. The historical argument provides examples of scientists profitably violating rules. Against Method contains dozens of case studies, though the majority of them are relegated to footnotes or passing remarks. The primary case study in Against Method is Galileo's hypothesis that the earth rotates on its axis.

Scholars have disputed the precise meaning of epistemological anarchism. John Preston claims that 'anything goes' signals Feyerabend's abandonment of normative philosophy. In other words, while Feyerabend defended pluralism in his works in the 1950s and 60s, Against Method represents a development in Feyerabend's thought where he abandons pluralism as well as normative theorizing altogether. A more common interpretation is that 'anything goes' does not represent a positive conviction of Feyerabend's but is the conclusion of a reductio ad absurdum. 'Anything goes' is therefore not a methodological prescription but "the terrified exclamation of the rationalist who takes a closer look at history". More recently, it has been argued that epistemological anarchism is a positive methodological proposal but comes in two inconsistent guises. On the one hand, epistemological anarchism means that scientists should be opportunists who adapt their methods to the situation at hand while, on the other hand, anarchism also signifies an unrestricted pluralism and therefore constitutes a radical generalization of his earlier arguments for pluralism.

=== Counterinduction ===
Feyerabend contends that for every methodological rule, there is a 'counter rule' – namely, a methodological rule that recommends the opposite of its counter – which also has value. As an example of this general hypothesis, Feyerabend defends 'counterinduction' as the counter rule to inductivism and "induction by falsification" as a valuable methodological rule. Counterinduction involves developing theories that are inconsistent with currently accepted empirical evidence, which is the opposite of the (then) commonly accepted rule that theories should be developed that are consistent with known facts. Feyerabend argues for counterinduction by showing that theories that conflict with known facts are useful for revealing 'natural interpretations' which must be made explicit so that they can be examined. Natural interpretations are interpretations of experience, expressed in language, that follow automatically and unconsciously from describing observations. After a theory has been accepted for a long period of time, it becomes habit to describe events or processes using certain concepts. Because, Feyerabend argues, observation underdetermines the ways we describe what we observe, theories that redescribe experience in new ways force us to make comparisons between old natural interpretations and new ones. This is the first step to evaluating the plausibility of either and so counterinduction aids in providing a thorough critical assessment of our acceptance of particular theories.

=== Galileo case study ===
The primary case study in Against Method is Galileo's hypothesis that the earth rotates on its axis. According to Feyerabend's reconstruction, Galileo did not justify this hypothesis by reference to known facts, nor did he offer an unfalsified conjecture that had more empirical content than its predecessor. Rather, Galileo's hypothesis would rationally have been considered to be false by the existing evidence at the time, and it is lower in empirical content than Aristotelian theory of motion. Moreover, Galileo did not provide arguments to justify his contention but instead used propaganda.

According to the existing evidence in the early 17th century, the position that the earth rotates on its axis would have rightly been regarded as false. For example, Galileo's theory of the tides suggested by the motion of the earth was inaccurate and the differences "were big enough to be known even to the most bleary-eyed sailor." In addition, the motion of the earth on its axis leads to the wrong predictions of the relative brightness of Mars and Venus when measured with the naked eye. To correct for these mistakes, Galileo introduces new evidence through his telescope. However, the telescope was not theoretically understood at the time. The best theory of optics was Kepler's, which Galileo did not understand personally, which says nothing about how light reflects off convex lenses. Moreover, there were well-confirmed reasons to think – as the Aristotelians thought – that light behaves differently outside of the sublunar sphere and so telescopic vision would not have any justification for being veridical. In addition, when Galileo tested the telescope with many observational astronomers in Padua, it produced indeterminate and double images, optical illusions about the placement and magnification of celestial bodies, and after images even when tested on terrestrial objects. Because of this, Galileo had no new evidence to support his conjecture that the earth completes a diurnal rotation on its axis and the existing evidence suggested that it was false.

Galileo's hypothesis also does not follow Popper's falsificationism, which suggests that we do not use ad hoc hypotheses. Aristotle's theory of motion was a part of a broader theory of change, which included growth, decay and qualitative changes (such as changes in color). Galileo's theory of motion focuses solely on locomotion and, therefore, has less empirical content than Aristotle's theory. This also makes it more ad hoc, because it makes no new predictions and offers only a promissory note that locomotion will eventually explain everything Aristotle's theory was able to explain.

Feyerabend does not just argue that Galileo and his followers acted "irrationally" from the perspective of inductivism and falsificationism, but that it was reasonable that they did so. This is because Galileo's conjecture was able to reveal the natural interpretations that followed from the Aristotelian worldview. Natural interpretations, defined by Feyerabend, are interpretations of phenomena which happen naturally and automatically in our perception and the ways we attach language to what we observe. After accepting a theory for a long period of time, natural interpretations become implicit and forgotten and, therefore, difficult to test. By contrasting natural interpretations with other interpretations, they are made explicit and can be tested. Therefore, to fully scrutinize the Aristotelian worldview, Feyerabend suggests that Galileo was right to conjecture a new theory that revealed its natural interpretations.

The main example of the influence of natural interpretations that Feyerabend provided was the tower argument presented as an objection to the theory of a moving earth. Aristotelians accepted the proposition that a stone, or any solid body made of earth, dropped from a tower lands directly beneath it, shows that the earth is stationary. They thought that, if the earth moved while the stone was falling, the stone would have been "left behind." Objects would fall in a parabola instead of vertically. Since this does not happen, Aristotelians thought the earth did not move. Galileo's hypothesis reveals that this assumes that all motion is "operative" (i.e., noticeable in perception). Galileo denies this assumption and argues that the stone falls in a parabola relative to absolute space, although the notion of absolute space was not made explicit and coherent until Newton.

However, Galileo did not present his work in this vein. If he had, Feyerabend conjectures that his new theory would have received little attention and would not have stimulated further inquiry into the Copernican system. Because of this, Galileo uses propaganda to make it seem as if his theories are implicit in the Aristotelian worldview. Specifically, Galileo makes it seem as if his conception of relative motion is embedded in Aristotelian common sense when it isn't (Aristotelian relative motion involves many moving bodies with dynamic effects noticeable in perception). According to Feyerabend, Galileo uses the technique of anamnēsis where he invites readers to "remember" that they already believed in relation motion in Galileo's sense. Using this method, he disguises how radical a break his new theory is from then common sense.

=== Discovery/justification distinction ===
Herbert Feigl criticizes Feyerabend's earlier work, including the paper edition of Against Method, for conflating the distinction between the context of discovery and the context of justification. According to this distinction, formulated by Hans Reichenbach and Karl Popper, there is no logic about how scientists develop scientific theories but there should be a logic of confirming or disconfirming scientific theories. Once this distinction is accepted, then Feyerabend's claim that 'anything goes' would be a truism and would not run against logical empiricism. Feyerabend's response in Against Method is to reject the validity of the discovery/justification distinction. He argues that while the distinction can be maintained abstractly, it does not find a "point of attack" in scientific practice. This is because the two contexts are not separated in different phases of scientific research but are always comingled. Discounting evidence, for example is often necessary for scientific discovery but is rejected when seeking justification. Justifying scientific theories has implications for what research is conducted and, therefore, questions about what is justified also affects the paths open to discovery.

=== Criticism of Lakatos ===
The first edition of Against Method contains a chapter devoted to critically discussing Lakatos' methodology of research programs, although this chapter was removed in subsequent editions. Feyerabend offers several criticisms. Lakatos claims that research programs should be permitted 'breathing space' where research programs are allowed to be pursued regardless of their lack of empirical content, internal inconsistency, or conflicts with experimental results. Feyerabend agrees with this claim but argues that applying it consistently entails that we cannot cease the pursuit of research programs after they have been degenerating (i.e., becoming increasingly ad hoc) (regardless of how long they've been degenerating for). Feyerabend uses the example of Boltzmann's atomism as a theory that was degenerating in the 19th century as a result of the Zermelo-Poincaré recurrence objection and Loschmidt’s reversibility objection but was then vindicated in the early 20th century with Einstein's development of statistical mechanics to illustrate this point. Because of this, Feyerabend claims that although Lakatos insists that he has provided rational rules for the elimination of research programs, these rules are empty because they do not forbid any kind of behavior. Therefore, Lakatos is an 'anarchist in disguise' since it provides methodological rules that do not need to be followed.

Feyerabend provides a second criticism that ends with the same conclusion. According to Lakatos, his theory of scientific rationality only contains heuristics for its implementation rather than direct advice. Because of this, Lakatos' theory on its own provides no advice and the specific advice follows from considerations of concrete research practices. His third criticism concerns Lakatos' argument that theories of rationality should be tested against the value judgments of the 'scientific elite' in specific historical episodes. First, Feyerabend claims that the value judgments of the scientific elite are rarely uniform and so they will not uniquely choose a particular theory of scientific rationality. Second, the value judgments of scientific elites are often made on the basis of ignorance. Therefore, there seem to be strong reasons to not accept those value judgments. Third, Lakatos assumes that the standards of the scientific elite are superior to other value judgments (e.g., of witches) and therefore does not provide an argument against relativism. Finally, Feyerabend provides a 'cosmological' criticism of Lakatos' theory of rationality. Lakatos claims that theories of scientific rationality reconstruct the 'internal' growth of knowledge and ignore the 'external' (e.g., sociological, psychological, political) features of scientific practice. However, without knowledge of the external features of scientific practice, Feyerabend claims that we cannot know whether a theory of scientific rationality will actually succeed in practice.

=== Scientific education ===
Feyerabend provides numerous criticisms of scientific education in his time. He claims that the primary role of education was to stunt individual creativity by forcing them to accept and research on topics that students did not choose for themselves. He also claims that education is responsible for what he calls "intellectual pollution" where "illiterate and incompetent books flood the market, empty verbiage full of strange and esoteric terms claims to express profound insights, 'experts' without brains, without character, and without even a modicum of intellectual, stylistic, emotional temperament tell us about our 'condition' and the means of improving it." He distinguishes between a general education, which is focused on the development of free individuals, and professionalization where one learns the ideology of a specific trade. In a general education, pupils are introduced to many intellectual and cultural traditions which they then engage with critically to make free choices about how they want to live their lives. Professionalization, by contrast, introduces pupils to a single tradition and often involves teaching this tradition as epistemically superior to its rivals. Feyerabend claims that increasing pushes for professionalization were coming at the expense of a general education. Feyerabend criticizes this on ethical grounds, as it reduces students to intellectual slaves, and on the grounds that a general education is more conductive to the development of knowledge.

== Scholarly reception ==
The immediate reaction to Against Method was largely negative amongst philosophers of science, with a few notable exceptions. Most of the commentary focused on Feyerabend's philosophical arguments rather than the Galileo case study. The primary criticisms were that epistemological anarchism is nothing but a repetition of Pyrrhonian skepticism or relativism, that Feyerabend is inconsistent with himself by arguing against method while arguing for methods (like counterinduction), and that he criticizes a strawman. One positive review came from Arne Naess, who had sympathies for epistemological anarchism.

Despite this, Against Method has remained one of the classic texts of 20th century philosophy of science and has been influential on subsequent philosophers of science (especially the Stanford School).

== Aftermath ==
Feyerabend responded to these criticisms in several follow-up publications, many of which he collected in Science in a Free Society. He was extremely frustrated by the quality of the reviews of Against Method, leading him to accuse them of illiteracy and a lack of competence. In his autobiography, he writes that he sometimes wishes that "he had never written that fucking book." This response led to Feyerabend's gradual removal from the academic community which also corresponded to changes of research topics in his work in the 1980s.
