= C. Kenneth Waters =

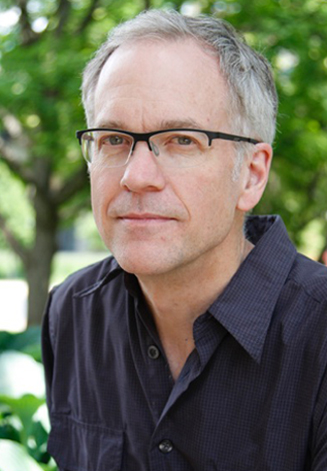
- Born: Vermont, USA
- Education: Indiana University
- Scientific career
- Fields: Biology (Biological Sciences); Reductionism; History of Science; Pluralism; Causal Reasoning
- Workplaces: University of Calgary
- Website: ckennethwaters.com

C. Kenneth Waters holds the Canada Research Chair in Logic and the Philosophy of Science and is Professor of Philosophy at the University of Calgary, where he specializes in philosophy of biology.

== Education and career ==
Waters received his undergraduate education from the University of Vermont and his M.A and PhD from Indiana University Bloomington in 1985. Waters has taught at the University of Calgary since 2014, and has held previous appointments at John Carroll University, Rice University, and the University of Minnesota. Waters was the Samuel Russell Chair of Humanities at the University of Minnesota and was Director of the Minnesota Center for Philosophy of Science from 1996 - 2014.

Waters has been named an AAAS Fellow and served as president of the Philosophy of Science Association.

== Philosophical work ==
Waters' research centers on the epistemology of biological sciences. He has written on reductionism, pluralism, experimentation, conceptual and investigative practices, and causal reasoning. He is a prominent figure in the Philosophy of Biology literature. His most prominent and influential philosophical research is focused on a historically informed epistemological account of how scientists succeed, and why this is philosophically important.

== Publications ==
- "Shifting Attention From Theory to Practice in Philosophy of Biology" in M.C. Galavotti, D. Dieks, W.J. Gonzalez, S. Hartmann, T. Uebel, and M. Weber (eds.) New Directions in the Philosophy of Science, ed. by. Berlin: Springer International Publishing, 2014, pages 121–139.
- "Beyond Theoretical Reduction and Layer-cake Antireduction: How DNA Retooled Genetics and Transformed Biological Practice", in Michael Ruse (ed.) Oxford Handbook to the Philosophy of Biology. New York, New York: Oxford University Press, 2008, pages 238–62.
- "Causes that Make a Difference", The Journal of Philosophy. Volume CIV, Number 11 (2007): pages 551–579.
- "The Pluralist Stance" with Stephen Kellert and Helen Longino, in Scientific Pluralism, Volume XIX of the Minnesota Studies in the Philosophy of Science, edited with Stephen Kellert, Helen Longino, Minneapolis, Minnesota: University of Minnesota Press, 2006, pages 7–29
- "Why Genic and Multilevel Selection Theories are Here to Stay", Philosophy of Science 72 (2) (2005): pages 311–33.
- "The Arguments in Darwin's Origin of Species", in The Cambridge Companion to Darwin, edited by Jonathan Hodge and Gregory Radick, Cambridge: Cambridge University Press, 2003, pages 116–139.
