= Kraft Circle =

Student society of philosophers at the University of Vienna

The Kraft Circle was a student society of philosophers at the Institut für Österreichische Geschichtsforschung of the University of Vienna devoted to "considering philosophical problems in a nonmetaphysical manner and with special reference to the findings of the sciences". Its chairman and leading professor was Viktor Kraft, a former associate of the Vienna Circle, to which the Kraft Circle is sometimes viewed as a post-Second World War extension. The Circle was a part of the Austrian College Society founded in 1945 by Austrian resistance fighters.

The club was founded in 1949 by science and engineering students interested in the philosophical foundations of their disciplines. In the first year Ludwig Wittgenstein gave a talk. The members were mainly students, but there were occasional faculty attendees and even "foreign dignitaries" made appearances. Meetings of the circle took place during the academic year, while international meetings of the Austrian College Society took place during the summer at Alpbach. The circle disbanded in 1952/53. Feyerabend's paper "An Attempt at a Realistic Interpretation of Experience" (Proceedings of the Aristotelian Society [1958]) is "a condensed version of the discussions in the Kraft Circle".

== Members ==
- Viktor Kraft, chairman
- Paul Feyerabend, founder
- Erich Jantsch, astrophysicist
- Johnny Sagan, later professor of mathematics at the University of Illinois
- Heinrich Eichhorn, later director of New Haven Observatory at Yale College
- Rudolf Goldberger de Buda, later professor of communications and electrical engineering at McMaster University
- Peter Schiske, physicist

== Bibliography ==
- Paul Feyerabend. Against Method. Revised edition. London: Verso, 1988.
- John Preston. "Paul Feyerabend". The Stanford Encyclopedia of Philosophy. Published 1 June 2009.
