= Criticism =

Practice of judging the merits and faults of something

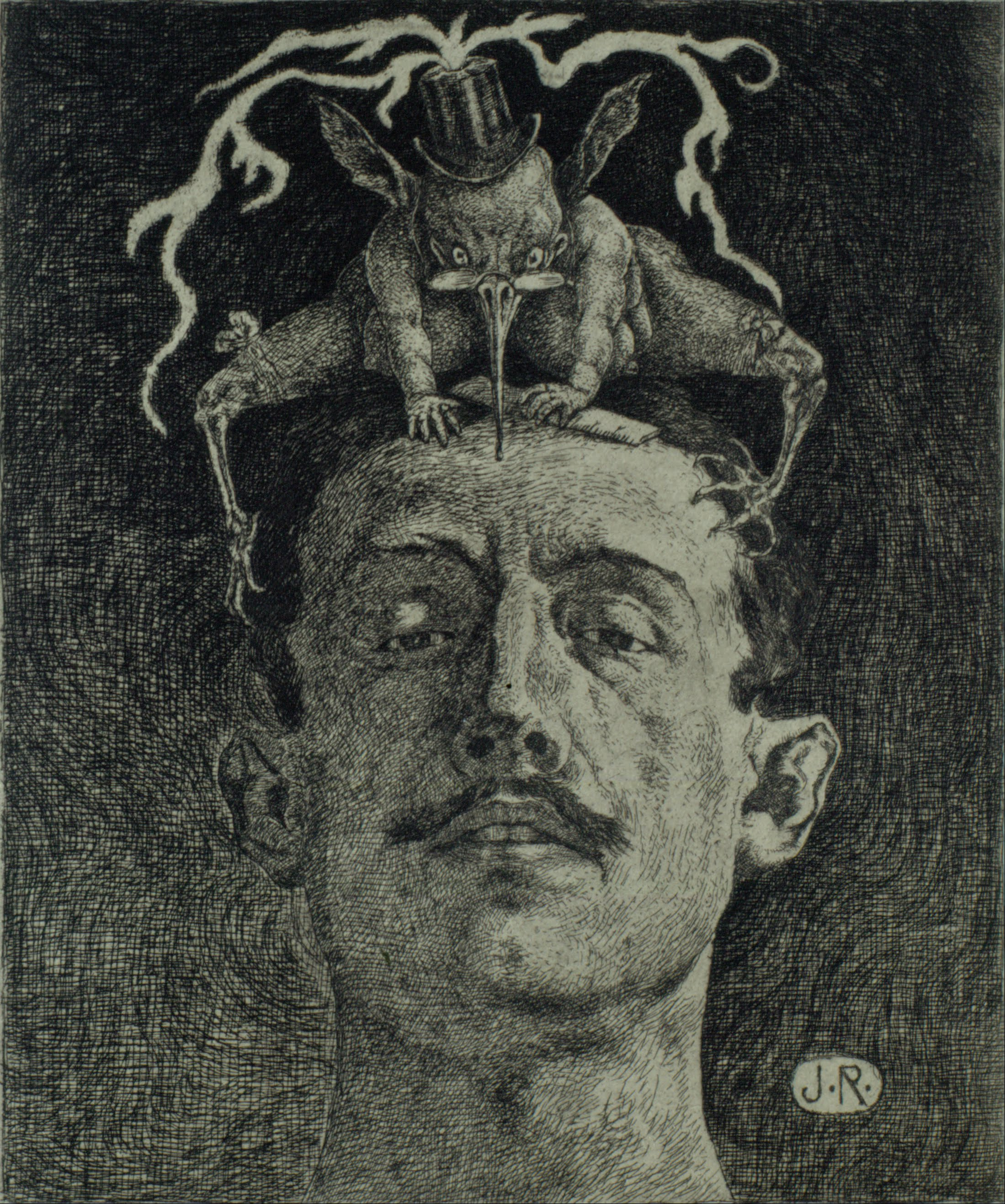
La Crítica, a 1906 self-portrait by Julio Ruelas where criticism is depicted as a creature atop his head.

Criticism is the construction of a judgement about the negative or positive qualities of someone or something. Criticism can range from impromptu comments to a written detailed response. Criticism falls into several overlapping types including "theoretical, practical, impressionistic, affective, prescriptive, or descriptive".

Criticism may also refer to an expression of disapproval of someone or something. When criticism of this nature is constructive, it can make an individual aware of gaps in their understanding and it can provide distinct routes for improvement. Research supports the notion that using feedback and constructive criticism in the learning process is very influential.

In French, German, or Italian, no distinction is drawn between the terms critique and criticism. The two words both translate as critique, Kritik, and critica, respectively. In the English language, philosopher Gianni Vattimo suggests that "criticism" is used more frequently to denote literary criticism or art criticism while "critique" refers to more general writing such as Immanuel Kant's Critique of Pure Reason. Another distinction that is sometimes made is that "critique" is never personalized nor ad hominem and is presented in a way that encourages rebuttal or expansion of the ideas expressed. Nonetheless, the distinctions are subtle and ambiguous at best.

The term "brickbat" is sometimes used to mean "an unfavourable criticism, unkind remark or sharp put-down". The term originated in the 17th century, derived from the practice of throwing bricks as projectiles at a person who was disapproved of.

In some contexts, such as literary criticism and art criticism, the word "criticism" is used as a neutral word that is synonymous with "evaluation."

== By field ==
=== Criticism of religion ===
Criticism of religion is the criticism of the validity, concept, or ideas of religion. Historical records of criticism of religion go back to at least the 5th century BCE in ancient Greece, in Athens specifically, with Diagoras "the Atheist" of Melos. In ancient Rome, an early known example is Lucretius' De rerum natura from the 1st century BCE.

=== Criticism of science ===
Criticism of science addresses problems within science in order to improve science as a whole and its role in society. Criticisms come from philosophy, from social movements like feminism, and from within science itself.

=== Critical theory ===
Critical theory criticizes power structures. The critical legal studies include criticism of the distinction between political argument and legal argument (popularized by the phrase the personal is political), rule of law and separation of powers. See also criticism of Critical theory.

=== Postmodernism ===
Postmodernism criticizes rationalism and objective reality. See also criticism of postmodernism.

== Criticism of criticism ==
Journalist and writer H. L. Mencken argued that "criticism is little more than a branch of homiletics. They judge a work of art, not by its clarity and sincerity, not by the force and charm of its ideas, not by the technical virtuosity of the artist, not by his originality and artistic courage, but simply and solely by his orthodoxy."

== See also ==
- Controversy
- Film criticism
- Self-criticism
- Social criticism
- Theatre criticism
