= Criticism of science =

Critical observation of science

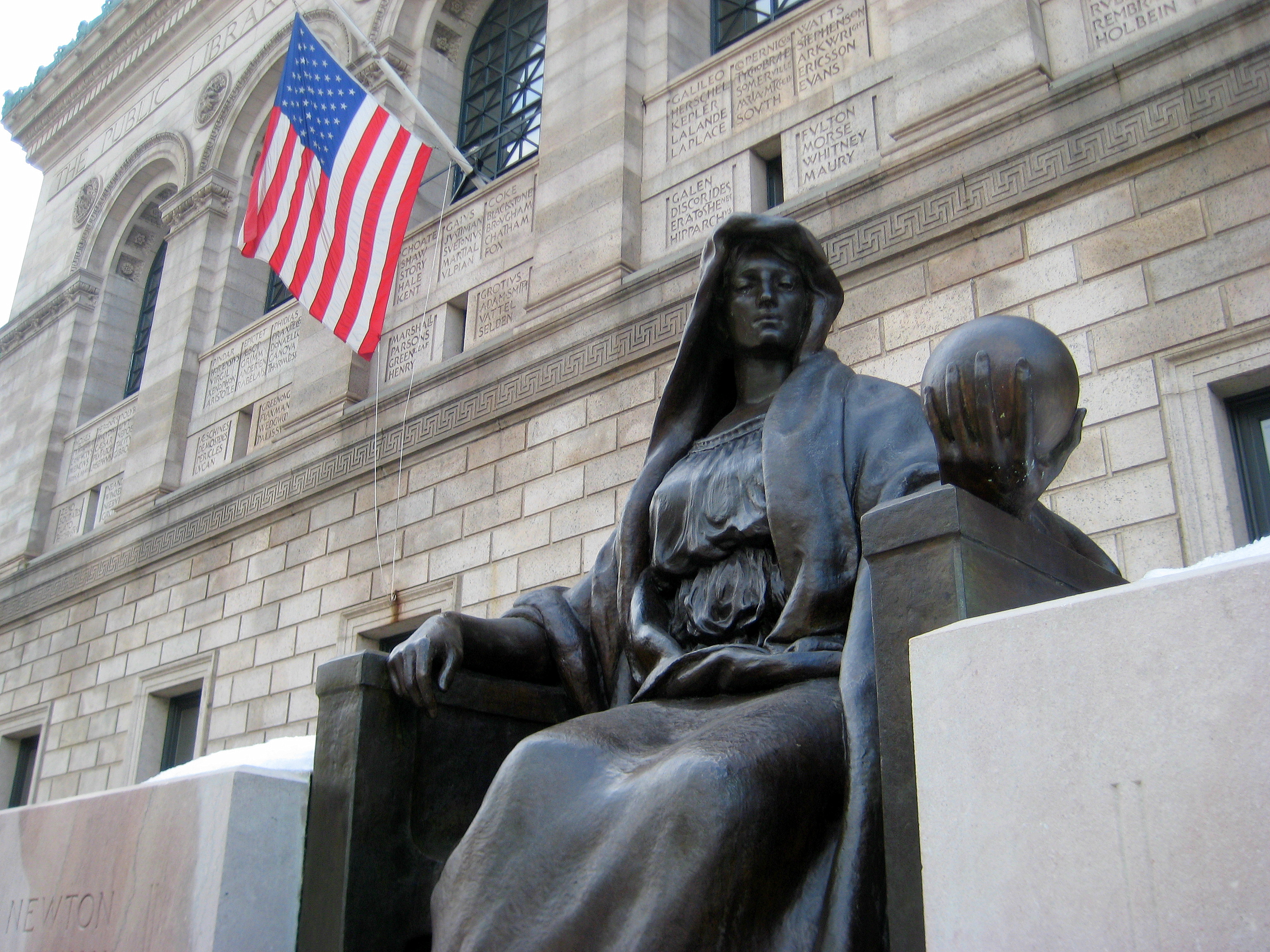
Personification of "Science" in front of the Boston Public Library

Criticism of science addresses problems within science in order to improve science as a whole and its role in society. Criticisms come from philosophy, from social movements like feminism, and from within science itself.

The emerging field of metascience seeks to increase the quality of and efficiency of scientific research by improving the scientific process.

== Philosophical critiques ==
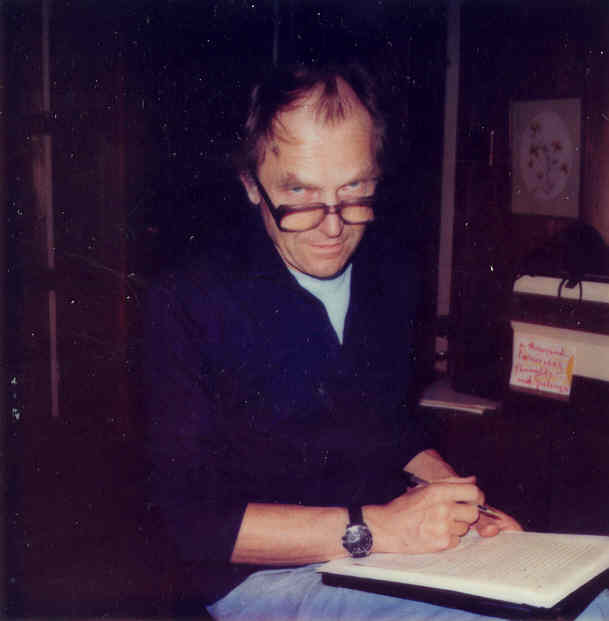
"All methodologies, even the most obvious ones, have their limits." ―Paul Feyerabend in Against Method

Philosopher of science Paul Feyerabend advanced the idea of epistemological anarchism, which holds that there are no useful and exception-free methodological rules governing the progress of science or the growth of knowledge, and that the idea that science can or should operate according to universal and fixed rules is unrealistic, pernicious and detrimental to science itself. Feyerabend advocates a democratic society where science is treated as equal to other ideologies or social institutions such as religion, and education, or magic and mythology, and considers the dominance of science in society authoritarian and unjustified. He also contended (along with Imre Lakatos) that the demarcation problem of distinguishing science from pseudoscience on objective grounds is not possible and thus fatal to the notion of science running according to fixed, universal rules.

Feyerabend also criticized science for not having evidence for its own philosophical precepts. Particularly the notion of Uniformity of Law and the Uniformity of Process across time and space, or Uniformitarianism in short, as noted by Stephen Jay Gould. "We have to realize that a unified theory of the physical world simply does not exist" says Feyerabend, "We have theories that work in restricted regions, we have purely formal attempts to condense them into a single formula, we have lots of unfounded claims (such as the claim that all of chemistry can be reduced to physics), phenomena that do not fit into the accepted framework are suppressed; in physics, which many scientists regard as the one really basic science, we have now at least three different points of view...without a promise of conceptual (and not only formal) unification". In other words, science is begging the question when it presupposes that there is a universal truth with no proof thereof.

Historian Jacques Barzun termed science "a faith as fanatical as any in history" and warned against the use of scientific thought to suppress considerations of meaning as integral to human existence.

Sociologist Stanley Aronowitz scrutinized science for operating with the presumption that the only acceptable criticisms of science are those conducted within the methodological framework that science has set up for itself. That science insists that only those who have been inducted into its community, through means of training and credentials, are qualified to make these criticisms. Aronowitz also alleged that while scientists consider it absurd that Fundamentalist Christianity uses biblical references to bolster their claim that the Bible is true, scientists pull the same tactic by using the tools of science to settle disputes concerning its own validity.

New-age writer Alan Watts criticized science for operating under a materialist model of the world that he posited is simply a modified version of the Abrahamic worldview, that "the universe is constructed and maintained by a Lawmaker" (commonly identified as God or the Logos). Watts asserts that during the rise of secularism through the 18th to 20th century when scientific philosophers got rid of the notion of a lawmaker they kept the notion of law, and that the idea that the world is a material machine run by law is a presumption just as unscientific as religious doctrines that affirm it is a material machine made and run by a lawmaker.

=== Epistemology ===
David Parkin compared the epistemological stance of science to that of divination. He suggested that, to the degree that divination is an epistemologically specific means of gaining insight into a given question, science itself can be considered a form of divination that is framed from a Western view of the nature (and thus possible applications) of knowledge.

Author and Episkopos of Discordianism Robert Anton Wilson stresses that the instruments used in scientific investigation produce meaningful answers relevant only to the instrument, and that there is no objective vantage point from which science could verify its findings since all findings are relative to begin with.

=== Ethics ===
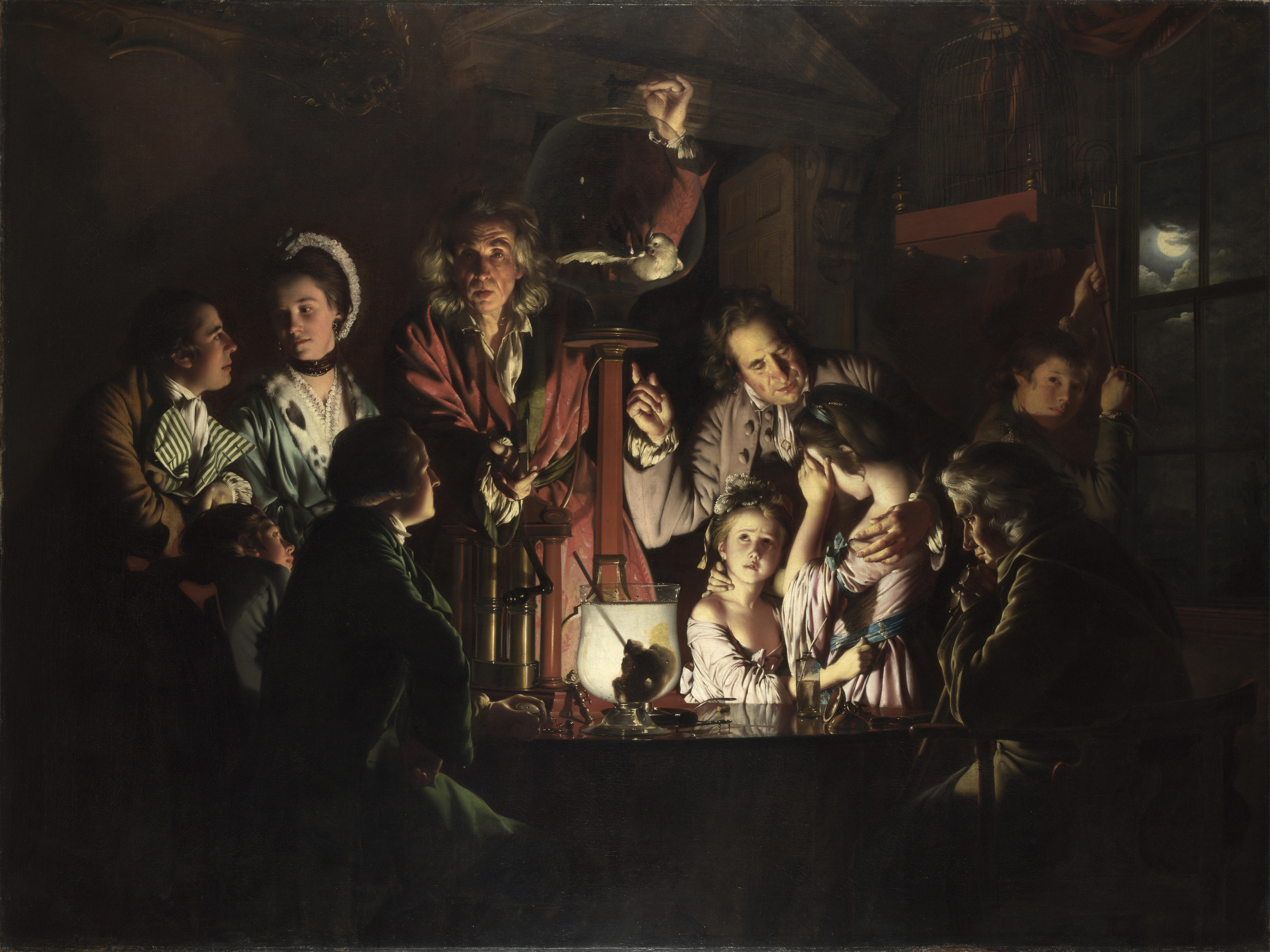
Joseph Wright of Derby (1768): An Experiment on a Bird in an Air Pump, National Gallery, London

Several academics have offered critiques concerning ethics in science. In Science and Ethics, for example, the professor of philosophy Bernard Rollin examines the relevance of ethics to science, and argues in favor of making education in ethics part and parcel of scientific training.

Social science scholars, like social anthropologist Tim Ingold, and scholars from philosophy and the humanities, like critical theorist Adorno, have criticized modern science for subservience to economic and technological interests. A related criticism is the debate on positivism. While before the 19th century science was perceived to be in opposition to religion, in contemporary society science is often defined as the antithesis of the humanities and the arts.

Many thinkers, such as Carolyn Merchant, Theodor Adorno and E. F. Schumacher considered that the 17th century Scientific Revolution shifted science from a focus on understanding nature, or wisdom, to a focus on manipulating nature, i.e. power, and that science's emphasis on manipulating nature leads it inevitably to manipulate people, as well. Science's focus on quantitative measures has led to critiques that it is unable to recognize important qualitative aspects of the world.

== Critiques from within science ==
Metascience is the use of scientific methodology to study science itself, with the goal of increasing the quality of research while reducing waste. Meta-research has identified methodological weaknesses in many areas of science. Critics argue that reforms are needed to address these weaknesses.

=== Reproducibility ===
The social sciences, such as social psychology, have long suffered from the problem of their studies being largely not reproducible. Now, medicine has come under similar pressures. In a phenomenon known as the replication crisis, journals are less likely to publish straight replication studies so it may be difficult to disprove results. Another result of publication bias is the Proteus phenomenon: early attempts to replicate results tend to contradict them. However, there are claims that this bias may be beneficial, allowing accurate meta-analysis with fewer publications.

=== Cognitive biases ===
Critics argue that the biggest bias within science is motivated reasoning, whereby scientists are more likely to accept evidence that supports their hypothesis and more likely to scrutinize findings that do not. Scientists do not practice pure induction but instead often come into science with preconceived ideas and often will, unconsciously or consciously, interpret observations to support their own hypotheses through confirmation bias. For example, scientists may re-run trials when they do not support a hypothesis but use results from the first trial when they do support their hypothesis. It is often argued that while each individual has cognitive biases, these biases are corrected for when scientific evidence converges. However, systematic issues in the publication system of academic journals can often compound these biases. Issues like publication bias, where studies with non-significant results are less likely to be published, and selective outcome reporting bias, where only the significant outcomes out of a variety of outcomes are likely to be published, are common within academic literature. These biases have widespread implications, such as the distortion of meta-analyses where only studies that include positive results are likely to be included. Statistical outcomes can be manipulated as well, for example large numbers of participants can be used and trials overpowered so that small difference cause significant effects or inclusion criteria can be changed to include those are most likely to respond to a treatment. Whether produced on purpose or not, all of these issues need to be taken into consideration within scientific research, and peer-reviewed published evidence should not be assumed to be outside of the realm of bias and error; some critics are now claiming that many results in scientific journals are false or exaggerated.

Science has been criticized for being too conformist, and for becoming on average less disruptive.

== Feminist critiques ==
Feminist scholars and women scientists such as Emily Martin, Evelyn Fox Keller, Ruth Hubbard, Londa Schiebinger and Bonnie Spanier have critiqued science because they believe it presents itself as objective and neutral while ignoring its inherent gender bias. They assert that gender bias exists in the language and practice of science, as well as in the expected appearance and social acceptance of who can be scientists within society.

Sandra Harding says that the "moral and political insights of the women's movement have inspired social scientists and biologists to raise critical questions about the ways traditional researchers have explained gender, sex, and relations within and between the social and natural worlds." Anne Fausto-Sterling is a prominent example of this kind of feminist work within biological science. Some feminists, such as Ruth Hubbard and Evelyn Fox Keller, criticize traditional scientific discourse as being historically biased towards a male perspective. A part of the feminist research agenda is the examination of the ways in which power inequities are created and/or reinforced in scientific and academic institutions.

Other feminist scholars, such as Ann Hibner Koblitz, Lenore Blum, Mary Gray, Mary Beth Ruskai, and Pnina Abir-Am and Dorinda Outram, have criticized some gender and science theories for ignoring the diverse nature of scientific research and the tremendous variation in women's experiences in different cultures and historical periods. For example, the first generation of women to receive advanced university degrees in Europe were almost entirely in the natural sciences and medicine—in part because those fields at the time were much more welcoming of women than were the humanities. Koblitz and others who are interested in increasing the number of women in science have expressed concern that some of the statements by feminist critics of science could undermine those efforts, notably the following assertion by Keller:

Just as surely as inauthenticity is the cost a woman suffers by joining men in misogynist jokes, so it is, equally, the cost suffered by a woman who identifies with an image of the scientist modeled on the patriarchal husband. Only if she undergoes a radical disidentification from self can she share masculine pleasure in mastering a nature cast in the image of woman as passive, inert, and blind.

=== Language in science ===
Emily Martin examines the metaphors used in science to support her claim that science reinforces socially constructed ideas about gender rather than objective views of nature. In her study about the fertilization process, Martin describes several cases when gender-biased perception skewed the descriptions of biological processes during fertilization and even possibly hampered the research. She asserts that classic metaphors of the strong dominant sperm racing to an idle egg are products of gendered stereotyping rather than a faithful portrayal of human fertilization. The notion that women are passive and men are active are socially constructed attributes of gender which, according to Martin, scientists have projected onto the events of fertilization and so obscuring the fact that eggs do play an active role. For example, she wrote that "even after having revealed...the egg to be a chemically active sperm catcher, even after discussing the egg's role in tethering the sperm, the research team continued for another three years to describe the sperm's role as actively penetrating the egg." Scott Gilbert, a developmental biologist at Swarthmore College supports her position: "if you don't have an interpretation of fertilization that allows you to look at the egg as active, you won't look for the molecules that can prove it. You simply won't find activities that you don't visualize."

== Media and politics ==
The mass media face a number of pressures that can prevent them from accurately depicting competing scientific claims in terms of their credibility within the scientific community as a whole. Determining how much weight to give different sides in a scientific debate requires considerable expertise regarding the matter. Few journalists have real scientific knowledge, and even beat reporters who know a great deal about certain scientific issues may know little about other ones they are suddenly asked to cover.

Many issues damage the relationship of science to the media and the use of science and scientific arguments by politicians. As a very broad generalisation, many politicians seek certainties and facts whilst scientists typically offer probabilities and caveats. However, politicians' ability to be heard in the mass media frequently distorts the scientific understanding by the public. Examples in Britain include the controversy over the MMR inoculation, and the 1988 forced resignation of a government minister, Edwina Currie, for revealing the high probability that battery eggs were contaminated with Salmonella.

Some scientists and philosophers suggest that scientific theories are more or less shaped by the dominant political, economic, or cultural models of the time, even though the scientific community may claim to be exempt from social influences and historical conditions. For example, the Russian philosopher, socialist, and zoologist Peter Kropotkin thought that the Darwinian theory of evolution overstressed a painful "we must struggle to survive" way of life, which he said was influenced by capitalism and the struggling lifestyles people lived within it. Karl Marx also thought that science was largely driven by and used as capital.

Robert Anton Wilson, Stanley Aronowitz, and Paul Feyerabend all thought that the military-industrial complex, large corporations, and the grants that came from them had an immense influence over the research and even results of scientific experiments. Aronowitz even went as far as to say "It does not matter that the scientific community ritualistically denies its alliance with economic/industrial and military power. The evidence is overwhelming that such is the case. Thus, every major power has a national science policy; the United States Military appropriates billions each year for 'basic' as well as 'applied' research".

== See also ==
- Academic bias
- Anti-intellectualism
- Antiscience
- Criticism of college and university rankings in North America
- Intellectual inbreeding
- Postmodernism
- Pseudoscience
- Pseudoskepticism
- Research paper mill
- Scientific misconduct
- Empirical limits in science
