= Science in a Free Society =

Book by Paul Feyerabend

- Cover of the Verso Book pressing
- Author: Paul Feyerabend
- Language: English
- Subjects: History of science Epistemology political philosophy
- Publisher: Schocken Books; New Left Books
- Publication date: 1978
- Media type: Print (Paperback)
- Pages: 221
- ISBN: 0860917533
- Preceded by: Against Method
- Followed by: Science as Art

Science in a Free Society is the 2nd full length book by the Austrian philosopher of science, Paul Feyerabend. It was published in 1978 by Schocken Books and later reprinted by Verso Books. While Feyerabend never published a second edition, Verso pressed four copies in 1982, 1983, 1985, and 1987.

Parts of the book were reprinted in later editions of Against Method. The book largely develops arguments from the first edition of Against Method and spells out their political implications. The book also contains a collection of previously published material in which he responds to some of his critics of Against Method. In 1979, Feyerabend also published, in German, Erkenntnis für freie Menschen (Knowledge for Free People), which contains roughly two-thirds of the material from Science in a Society while expanding on some sections and diminishing others.

== Content ==
The book is divided into three sections:

1. "Reason and Practice" expounds Feyerabend's theory of rationality as something embedded in, rather than separate from, traditions.
2. "Science in a Free Society" develops Feyerabend's views about the place of science in democratic societies.
3. "Conversations with Illiterates" provides responses to criticisms of Against Method.

=== Reason and Practice ===
The first section develops a version of Protagorean relativism. Feyerabend argues against two views: idealism, which he defines as the view that the authority of reason is independent from tradition and practice, and naturalism or the view that the authority of reason derives from practice. Idealism is wrong, Feyerabend argues, because the authority of reason depends on its ability to be integrated into a coherent practice. If one were to apply a view of rationality to practice and the practice were to suffer, then the theory of rationality can be rejected. Naturalism is wrong because it treats the norms that already happen to be in practice dogmatically. Feyerabend develops a view that synthesizes elements of each, which he claims amounts to a form of relativism.

To allow for collective decision making when traditions conflict, Feyerabend argues for two kinds of dialogues: "guided" and "open" exchanges. Guided exchanges require shared assumptions that 'guide' the deliberation process whereas open exchanges have no prior constraints introduced upon dialogue.

=== Science in a Free Society ===
The second section spells out the political implications of relativism. Feyerabend argues against the view that there should be 'experts' who dictate policy decisions and that experts should be supervised by democratically representative laypeople. He argues that expertise is often exaggerated and laypeople are competent enough to criticize their views. This includes scientific experts. Because of this, Feyerabend thinks that science and the state should be separated in an analogous way as the religion and the state are separated in secular societies.

=== Conversations with Illiterates ===
The final section collects some of Feyerabend's previously published responses to criticisms of Against Method. This section is largely polemical and argues that many of his critics suffered from illiteracy.

== Scholarly reception ==
Responses to Science in a Free Society were mixed, but largely positive.

== Bibliography ==
- Clark, Stephen R. L. (1980). "Review of Science in a Free Society". The Philosophical Quarterly. 30 (119): 172–174. doi:10.2307/2219292. ISSN 0031-8094. JSTOR 2219292.
- Dumez, Hervé (1983). "Review of Contre la méthode; Science in a Free Society, Paul Feyerabend". L'Année Sociologique (1940/1948-). 33: 301–306. ISSN 0066-2399. JSTOR 27889717.
- Dunlap, Thomas R. (1984). "Review of Science in a Free Society". Isis. 75 (1): 211–212. doi:10.1086/353452. ISSN 0021-1753. JSTOR 232378.
- Freese, Lee (1980). "Review of Science in a Free Society". Contemporary Sociology. 9 (3): 412–413. doi:10.2307/2064270. ISSN 0094-3061. JSTOR 2064270.
- Joravsky, David (June 28, 1979). "Scientists as Servants". The New York Review of Books. ISSN 0028-7504.
- Koertge, Noretta (1980). "Review of Science in a Free Society". The British Journal for the Philosophy of Science. 31 (4): 385–390. doi:10.1093/bjps/31.4.385. ISSN 0007-0882. JSTOR 687065.
- Largeault, J. (1979). "Review of Science in a Free Society". Revue Philosophique de la France et de l'Étranger. 169 (4): 448–451. ISSN 0035-3833. JSTOR 41095149.
- Munévar, Gonzalo (1991). "Science in Feyerabend's Free Society". In Munévar, Gonzalo (ed.). Beyond Reason: Essays on the Philosophy of Paul Feyerabend. Boston Studies in the Philosophy of Science. Vol. 132. Dordrecht: Springer Netherlands. pp. 179–198. doi:10.1007/978-94-011-3188-9_7. ISBN 978-94-011-3188-9.
- "Review of Research Policy Program; Science in a Free Society; 'The Political Economy of Science' and 'The Radicalisation of Science'". Acta Sociologica. 22 (2): 201–204. 1979. ISSN 0001-6993. JSTOR 4194294.
- Schlagel, Richard H. (1981). "Review of Science in a Free Society". The Review of Metaphysics. 35 (2): 383–385. ISSN 0034-6632. JSTOR 20127668.
- Steedman, Philip (1982). "Review of Against Method: Outline of an Anarchistic Theory of Knowledge; Science in a Free Society, P. K. Feyerabend". Theory and Society. 11 (5): 724–728. ISSN 0304-2421. JSTOR 657348.
- Steiner, George (February 1979). "A revaluation of all values". Nature. 277 (5695): 415. Bibcode:1979Natur.277..415S. doi:10.1038/277415a0. ISSN 1476-4687. S2CID 36697254.
