= The Encyclopedia of Philosophy =

Encyclopedia

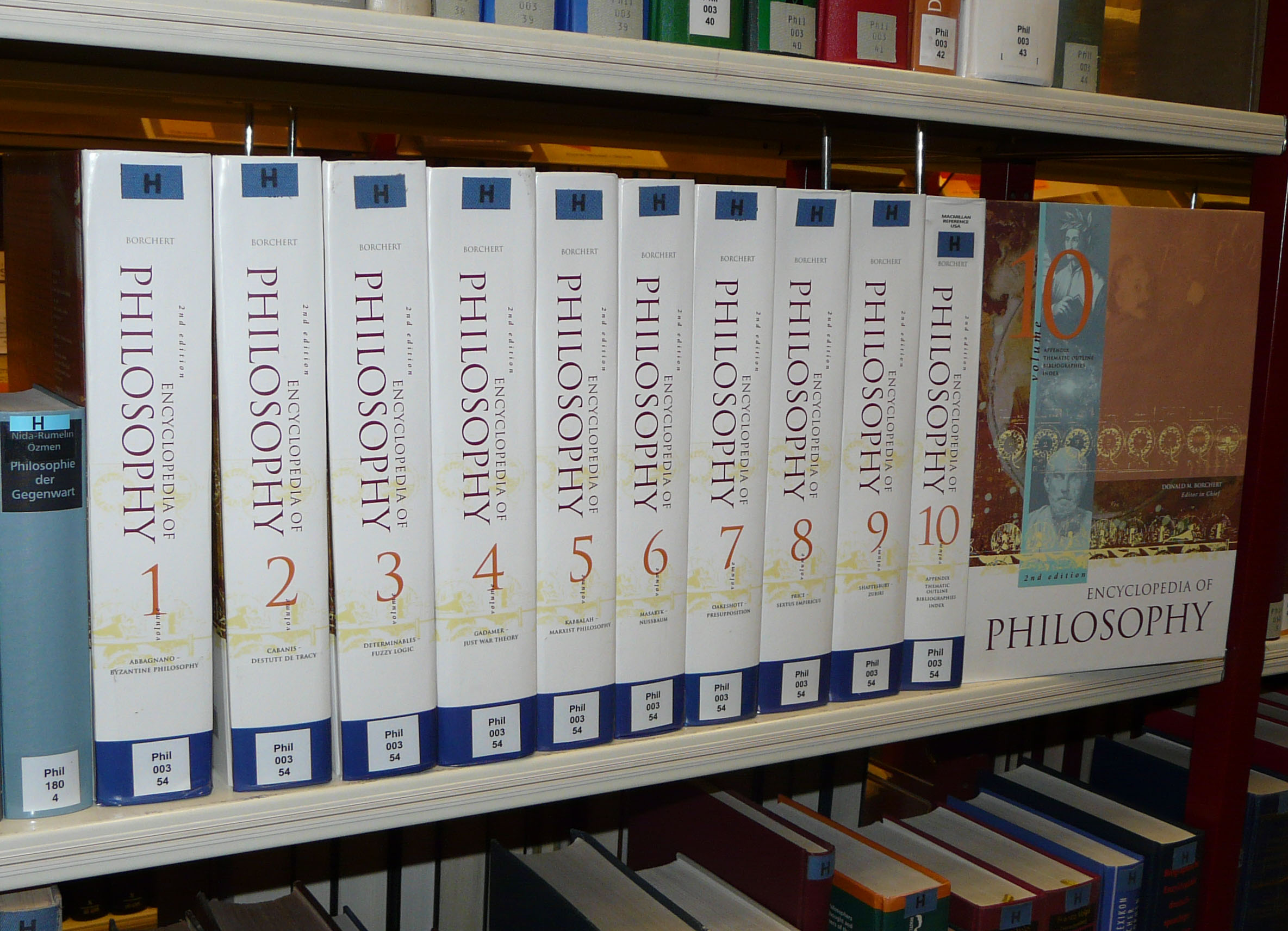
Encyclopedia of Philosophy, second edition

The Encyclopedia of Philosophy is one of the major English encyclopedias of philosophy.

== Overview ==
The first edition of the encyclopedia was edited by philosopher Paul Edwards (1923–2004), and it was published in two separate printings by Macmillan. The first printing of the first edition appeared in 1967 as an 8-volume set of books. The second printing of the first edition appeared in 1972 as a 4-volume set of books, which however still contained all of the material which had been included in the original 8-volume printing/format of the encyclopedia.

A "Supplement" volume to the first edition of the encyclopedia was published in 1996 and was edited by Canadian-born philosopher and educator Donald M. Borchert (born May 23, 1934). This volume titled "Supplement" is sometimes referred to as "Volume 9" of the 8-volume (1967) printing of the encyclopedia, or as "Volume 5" of the 4-volume (1972) printing, although neither the words "Volume 9" nor the words "Volume 5" appear anywhere on the book. This "Supplement" volume contains articles on developments in philosophy since 1967, covering new subjects and scholarship updates, and new or revised articles on subjects that were written about in the first edition.

The second edition of the encyclopedia, also edited by Donald M. Borchert, was published in 10 volumes in 2006 by Macmillan Reference USA. Volumes 1–9 contain alphabetically ordered articles. Volume 10 consists of:

- Appendix (pp. 1–48), containing updates and additions to the articles in the preceding volumes;
- Thematic outline of content (pp. 49–66);
- Bibliographies (pp. 67–177);
- Index (pp. 179–671).

Its ISBNs are 0-02-865780-2 as a hardcover set, and 0-02-866072-2 as an e-book.

== See also ==
- Internet Encyclopedia of Philosophy
- Routledge Encyclopedia of Philosophy
- Stanford Encyclopedia of Philosophy
