= Victor Kraft =

Austrian philosopher

- Born: 4 July 1880; Vienna, Austria-Hungary
- Died: 3 January 1975 (aged 94); Purkersdorf, Austria

Education
- Education: University of Vienna
- Academic advisors: Alois Höfler; Friedrich Jodl; Adolf Stöhr

Philosophical work
- Era: 20th-century philosophy
- Region: Western philosophy
- School: Vienna Circle; Logical positivism Kraft Circle
- Institutions: University of Vienna
- Doctoral students: Ingeborg Bachmann; Paul Feyerabend
- Main interests: Epistemology; Philosophy of science Scientific method Ethics; Value theory
- Notable ideas: Scientific analysis of value

Victor Kraft (Austrian German: [kraft]; 4 July 1880 – 3 January 1975) was an Austrian philosopher. He is best known for being a member of the Vienna Circle. He defended an epistemology grounded in ontological realism.

== Early life and education ==
Kraft studied philosophy, geography and history at the University of Vienna. He participated in the events of the university's Philosophical Society, as well as with private circles (especially Oskar Ewald, Otto Weininger and Othmar Spann). He received in 1903 his Ph.D. with a dissertation titled The Knowledge of the External World (Die Erkenntnis der Außenwelt). Then he moved to Berlin to continue his studies under Georg Simmel, Wilhelm Dilthey and Carl Stumpf at the University of Berlin. Kraft started working in 1912 at the university's library, where he was a scientific civil servant ("Beamter") until 1939. In 1914, he completed his habilitation at Vienna under Adolf Stöhr (with Friedrich Jodl and Alois Höfler also involved in the habilitation procedure) with his book The Concept of World and the Concept of Knowledge (Weltbegriff und Erkenntnisbegriff). Kraft attend regularly the Vienna Circle until its dissolution, and at the same time was also a member of the Gomperz Circle and had contacts to the so-called periphery of the Vienna Circle (e.g., Karl Popper). Victor Kraft received the title of associate professor for theoretical philosophy in 1924.

== Academic career ==
After the Anschluss, Kraft was forced to leave his librarian position because of his wife's Jewish background. He lost his habilitation as university teacher as well. Kraft continued his philosophical research with great difficulties as "inner emigrant" during the Nazi regime.

He regained his post at the university library in 1945, and became Generalstaatsbibliothekar (national librarian) in 1947. In this year he was also appointed associate professor for philosophy. Three years later he became full professor and co-director of the school of philosophy. He retired from his post in 1952. Kraft kept his research and publishing until his death. The Kraft Circle, which he chaired between 1949 and 1952/3, was named after him, and it was during this period that he supervised the dissertation of Paul Feyerabend and Ingeborg Bachmann.

=== Philosophical work ===
Among the logical positivists, Kraft represents a unique standing point: he wrote about a non-sensualist empiricism with a hypothetical-deductive structure. Before the First World War (and after it together with the Vienna Circle members) he dedicated most of his lectures and publications to promote scientific philosophy. He also made important contributions to the establishment of ethics as science and wrote about the theory of geography and the philosophy of history.
