= Paul Edwards (philosopher) =

American philosopher (1923–2004)

- Born: September 2, 1923; Vienna, Austria
- Died: December 9, 2004 (aged 81); New York City, U.S.
- Education: University of Melbourne (BA, 1944; MA, 1947); Columbia University (PhD, 1951)
- Occupation: Philosopher
- Employer(s): New York University, Brooklyn College, The New School for Social Research
- Known for: Editor-in-chief of Macmillan's Encyclopedia of Philosophy

Paul Edwards (September 2, 1923 – December 9, 2004) was an Austrian-born American moral philosopher. He was the editor-in-chief of Macmillan's eight-volume Encyclopedia of Philosophy from 1967, and lectured at New York University, Brooklyn College, and The New School for Social Research from the 1960s to the 1990s.

== Life and career ==
Edwards was born Paul Eisenstein in Vienna in 1923 to assimilated Jewish parents, the youngest of three brothers. According to Peter Singer, his upbringing was non-religious. He distinguished himself early on as a gifted student and was admitted to the Akademisches Gymnasium, a prestigious Viennese high school. When Germany annexed Austria in 1938, Edwards was sent by his family to Scotland, later joining them in Melbourne, Australia, where the family name was changed to Edwards. He attended Melbourne High School, graduating as dux of the school, then studied philosophy at the University of Melbourne, completing a B.A. and M.A.

He was awarded a scholarship to study in England in 1947, but on his way there, he stopped in New York and ended up staying there for the rest of his life, apart from a brief period teaching at the University of California, Berkeley. He was awarded his doctorate by Columbia University in 1951. While writing his doctoral thesis he contacted Bertrand Russell because he shared Russell's scepticism about religious belief. This led to a lasting friendship and a number of joint projects. Edwards collected Russell's writings on religion and published them in 1957, with an appendix on "the Bertrand Russell case," under the title Why I am not a Christian. He taught at New York University until 1966, at Brooklyn College from then until 1986, and at the New School from the 1960s until 1999.

Edwards was characterized by Michael Wreen as "mixed one part analytic philosopher to one part philosophe" with "a deep respect for science and common sense." His considerable influence on moral philosophy came from two works he edited, a very widely used introductory anthology he co-edited with Arthur Pap, A Modern Introduction to Philosophy (1957, 1965, 1973) and the Encyclopedia of Philosophy (1967), an eight-volume "massive Enlightenment work with notable analytic sensibility."

He was one of the signers of the Humanist Manifesto.

Philosopher Timothy Madigan wrote in an obituary: "Those who knew Edwards will always remember his erudition and his wicked sense of humour. [ ... ] Given Paul's own biting wit, it's not surprising that he so admired Voltaire and Russell. [ ... ] Never one to hide his own unbelief, he often commented that his two main goals were to demolish the influence of Heidegger and keep alive the memory of Wilhelm Reich, the much-reviled psychoanalyst whose critiques of religion Edwards felt remained valid." Edwards was also sympathetic to the Danish philosopher Søren Kierkegaard, although he detested Kierkegaardian existentialist admirers such as Heidegger and William Barrett for confusing and conflating Kierkegaardian terminology.

== Encyclopedia of Philosophy ==
Edwards was editor-in-chief of Macmillan's Encyclopedia of Philosophy, published in 1967. With eight volumes and nearly 1,500 entries by over 500 contributors, it is one of the monumental works of twentieth century philosophy. Using his editorial prerogative, Edwards made sure that there were plentiful entries on atheism, materialism and related subjects (which is not surprising considering that such subjects would have been of interest to modern philosophers). He always remained "a fervent advocate of clarity and rigour in philosophical argument." When, after four decades, the Encyclopedia was revised by other editors for a new edition, Edwards told Peter Singer that he was "distressed that the revisions had diluted the philosophical message and had been too gentle on a lot of postmodern thought."

== Reincarnation ==
Edwards was highly skeptical of claims regarding reincarnation. He was the author of the book Reincarnation: A Critical Examination (1996), which is notable for criticizing the cases collected by Ian Stevenson. The book has received positive reviews from academics. Barry Beyerstein wrote that "Skeptics who follow my recommendation and read Reincarnation: A Critical Examination will derive much ammunition for arguing not only with reincarnationists but with 'near-death experience' aficionados and afterlife enthusiasts of other stripes as well." Philosopher and parapsychologist Stephen E. Braude criticized the arguments presented in Edwards's book, saying, "Apparently Edwards did not realize that his condescending and allegedly hard-nosed attack on reincarnationists was as deeply (and inevitably) metaphysical as the view he opposed."

== Wilhelm Reich ==
Edwards said that when he arrived in New York in 1947 Wilhelm Reich was "the talk of the town" and that for years he and his friends regarded Reich as "something akin to a messiah": "There was ... a widespread feeling that Reich had an original and penetrating insight into the troubles of the human race." Twenty years later, as editor-in-chief of the Encyclopedia of Philosophy, Edwards wrote an article about Reich, comprising 11 pages as compared to the four devoted to Sigmund Freud. He pointed out what is of interest to philosophers in Reich: his views concerning the origin of religious and metaphysical needs, the relation between the individual and society and the possibility of social progress, and, above all, the implications of his psychiatry for certain aspects of the mind–body problem. An abridged version of the article appeared in the Encyclopedia of Unbelief (ed. Gordon Stein, 1985).

Edwards omitted Reich's orgone therapy from the Encyclopedia article because, he said, "it is of no philosophical interest." However, in a BBC interview he said somewhat more: "I concede that Reich had no real competence as a physicist... At the same time I am quite convinced that the orgone theory cannot be complete nonsense. For a number of years, largely out of curiosity, I sat in an orgone accumulator once a day."

== Works ==
=== Books ===
- (1949). Bertrand Russell's Doubts About Induction
- (1950). The Logic of Moral Discourse
- (1957). A Modern Introduction to Philosophy; Readings from Classical and Contemporary Sources. (co-editor, with Arthur Pap; 2nd. ed. 1965; 3rd. ed. 1973)
- (1958). Hard and Soft Determinism
- (1959). The Cosmological Argument
- (1966). Ethics and Language
- (1967). Atheism
- (1967). Encyclopedia of Philosophy (8 vols), editor-in-chief
- (1969). Ethics and Atheism
- (1970). Buber and Buberism
- (1979). Heidegger on Death
- (1989). Voltaire, Selections, edited, with introduction, notes, and annotated bibliography by P.E.
- (1991). Immortality
- (2001). Reincarnation: A Critical Examination
- (2004). Heidegger's Confusions
- (2009). God and the Philosophers (posthumous)

=== Selected articles ===
- (1971). "Kierkegaard and the 'Truth' of Christianity", Philosophy: The Journal for the Royal Institute of Philosophy, Cambridge Journals
- (1986–1987). "The Case Against Reincarnation", Free Inquiry, four-part series.
- (1989) “Heidegger’s Quest for Being.” Philosophy, vol. 64, no. 250, 1989, pp. 437–70.

== See also ==
- American philosophy
- List of American philosophers
