= Killing Time (autobiography) =

1994 autobiography by Paul Feyerabend

- Author: Paul Feyerabend
- Language: English
- Genre: Autobiography
- Publisher: University of Chicago Press
- Publication date: 1994
- English publication date: July 5, 1995
- Media type: Print (hardcover)
- Pages: 203
- ISBN: 0226245314
- OCLC: 185633935
- Dewey Decimal: 193 B 20
- LC Class: B3240.F484 A3 1995
- Preceded by: Three Dialogues on Knowledge
- Followed by: Conquest of Abundance: A Tale of Abstraction versus the Richness of Being

Killing Time: The Autobiography of Paul Feyerabend is an autobiography by philosopher Paul Feyerabend. The book details, amongst other things, Feyerabend's youth in Nazi-controlled Vienna, his military service, notorious academic career, and his multiple romantic conquests. The book's title, Killing Time is a play on the homophone Feierabend, a German compound noun meaning 'the workday's end and the evening following it'.

Feyerabend barely managed to finish writing the book, lying in a hospital bed with an inoperable brain tumor and the left side of his body paralyzed, and he died shortly before it was released. Killing Time was first published in an Italian translation (by Alessandro de Lachenal) in 1994, with the English original as well as German (by Joachim Jung) and Spanish (by Fabián Chueca) translations following the year afterward. It is one of Feyerabend's best-known works.

== Summary ==
Feyerabend discloses that he did not keep any careful records of his life and destroyed much of the documentation autobiographers usually preserve, including a family album discarded "to make room for what I then thought were more important books", and correspondences ("even from Nobel Prize winners"). The book relies on Feyerabends's own memory as well as the various stray sources that he did manage to keep. His personal and intellectual experiences and his romantic and artistic adventures comprise roughly half the book. He recounts how he survived the depressions and suicide of his mother, his bare survival of World War II as an officer in the Wehrmacht, and his forgone apprenticeship as a tenor to Bertolt Brecht. His stormy relationships with philosophical contemporaries including mentor Karl Popper, friend and colleague Imre Lakatos and department chair of philosophy at University of California, Berkeley John Searle are described in vivid anecdotes. The book contains ruminations on the themes of evil, compassion and anti-Semitism.

== Reception ==
The book was well received overall, earning largely favorable reviews in the British Journal for the Philosophy of Science, Nature (from Peter Lipton), The New Republic (from Richard Rorty) and New Scientist. Friend and student of Feyerabend Sheldon J. Reaven hailed the autobiography as "delightful" and "revealing", while a reviewer in Contemporary Sociology found the book "by turns charming and infuriating". Prolific reviewer Danny Yee called it "an engaging autobiography of an intriguing individual who lead [sic] an eventful life", and remarked that the book could be appreciated by readers uninterested in philosophy of science or who had never heard of Feyerabend. Kirkus Reviews described it as "a fascinating memoir with an ending that will change many people's opinion about the Peck's bad boy of philosophy". The New York Times Book Review gave the article an "A−" grade, with reviewer Nancy Maull commenting that "There is much to admire and much to frustrate admiration in the account. But in his instructive, stubborn and unbending refusal to be dazzled by theory, [Feyerabend] still has no rival."
