= Conquest of Abundance =

Book by the Austrian philosopher of science Paul Feyerabend

Conquest of Abundance: A Tale of Abstraction versus the Richness of Being
- Author: Paul Feyerabend
- Language: English
- Subjects: History of science Philosophy of Science; Epistemology
- Publisher: University of Chicago Press
- Publication date: 1999
- Media type: Print (Hardcover and Paperback)
- Pages: 285
- ISBN: 9780226245348
- Preceded by: Killing Time
- Followed by: Philosophy of Nature

Conquest of Abundance: A Tale of Abstraction versus the Richness of Being is the last book by the Austrian philosopher of science Paul Feyerabend, published posthumously by the University of Chicago Press in 1999. It is edited by Bert Terpstra and includes a foreword from Grazia Borrini-Feyerabend, Feyerabend's 4th and final wife. The book was uncompleted due to Feyerabend's death in 1994 and was written to fulfill a promise made to Borrini-Feyerabend. The unfinished manuscript was published alongside several other previously published papers that engaged with the core themes of the book.

== Translations ==
Conquest of Abundance has been translated into four languages:

- Spanish translation by Radamés Molina and César Mora: La conquista de la abundancia: La abstracción frente a la riqueza del ser, Paidós: Barcelona and Buenos Aires 2001, 336 pp.
- Italian translation by P. Adamo: Conquista dell'abbondanza: Storie dello scontro fra astrazione e ricchezza dell'essere, Raffaello Cortina: Milan 2002, 350 pp.
- German translation by Volker Böhnigk and Rainer Noske: Die Vernichitung der Vielfalt: Ein Bericht, Peter Engelmann (ed.), Passagen: Vienna 2005, 344 pp.
- Portuguese translation by Cecília Prada and Marcelo Rouanet: A Conquista da Abundância, Unisinos: São Leopoldo 2005.

== Content ==
Conquest of Abundance contains two sections. The first includes the unfinished manuscript while the second section republishes essays on themes related to the manuscript. The primary thesis of the manuscript is that the universe that surrounds us, which he calls ‘Being’, is more abundant than we usually admit. By this, Feyerabend means that there are many more entities that populate various domains than are admitted into most scientific theories. Scientific theories use abstraction to simplify the phenomena which thereby reduce their empirical content. Experiments in laboratories often create objects that omit many features that they possess outside of the lab. Feyerabend's thesis is not just limited to science, as he uses examples from art history – specifically Brunelleschi's invention of perspective – to substantiate this position.

We must reduce the abundance of Being in order to live our lives, but—Feyerabend argues—this can be done in multiple ways. He thus defends a kind of ontological pluralism. In other words, Being is pliable enough to allow for many realities (but not all, as it offers resistance to some). The consequences of a given worldview or set of stories about reality are "not grounded in an 'objective' nature but come from a complicated interplay between an unknown and relatively pliable material and the researchers who affect and are affected and changed by the material [...] The 'subjective' side of knowledge, being inextricably intertwined with its material manifestations, cannot be just blown away. Far from merely stating what is already there, it creates conditions of existence, a world corresponding to these conditions and a life that is adapted to this world; all three support or 'establish' the conjectures that let to them."

Because of the diversity of possible realities, choice plays an important role in what theories we accept. This leads Feyerabend to criticize those who impose their own view of what is real and desirable, regardless of the views and wishes of others. "Entire communities are displaced, their ways of life destroyed [...] they are unhappy, they protest, even revolt-- but this does not count. It is not as 'real' as the fact projected by an 'objective' economic science. [...] I suggest that we argue from the 'subjective', 'irrational', idiosyncratic kind of life we are in sympathy with, to what is to be regarded as real.[...this] is not motivated by a contempt for science but by the wish to subject it-- this product of relatively free agents-- to the judgement of other free agents, instead of being frightened by a petrified version of it." Here Feyerabend defends what he calls ‘Aristotle's principle’, which states that what counts as real depends on what kind of life we want to live, i.e., we can choose to live in a world that makes sense to us.

== Scholarly reception ==
Conquest of Abundance was generally well-received and has been influential in contemporary debates about science and values.
