= Scientific pluralism =

Position within the philosophy of science

Scientific pluralism is a position within the philosophy of science that rejects various proposed unities of scientific method and subject matter. Scientific pluralists hold that science is not unified in one or more of the following ways: the metaphysics of its subject matter, the epistemology of scientific knowledge, or the research methods and models that should be used. Some pluralists believe that pluralism is necessary due to the nature of science. Others say that since scientific disciplines already vary in practice, there is no reason to believe this variation is wrong until a specific unification is empirically proven. Finally, some hold that pluralism should be allowed for normative reasons, even if unity were possible in theory.

== History ==
Since the development of logical positivism by the Vienna Circle in the 1920s and 1930s, theories of unified science have posited that all scientific investigation shares a common framework. In the strongest versions of these theories, all of the special sciences should be reducible to physics. Therefore, all science could in theory follow one shared methodology and be described in a shared jargon, even if in current practice this is not the case due to limitations in the development of human knowledge and technology. (Note: While criticizing unity of science theories in general, J. A. Fodor indicates that the strongest, most reductionist version of the theory is more common in non-philosophers' understanding of the unity of science than among philosophers of science.) The specific theories of the Vienna Circle are no longer commonly held, but there are a variety of unities proposed by more recent philosophers.

Although earlier pluralistic conceptions of science persisted during the rise of positivism, modern conceptions of scientific pluralism began to emerge in the 1970s. In a 1978 address to the Philosophy of Science Association, Stanford University professor Patrick Suppes argued against what he called "reduction of language, reduction of subject matter, and reduction of method" in science. He positioned his talk as a response to ideas in the first volume of the International Encyclopedia of Unified Science, which was published in 1938. He argued that since that time the subjects of scientific disciplines had become more differentiated, with greater divergences in language and methodology, showing no move toward the unities posited by the encyclopedia's Vienna Circle authors. Other members of what came to be called the "Stanford School" supporting scientific pluralism were Nancy Cartwright, John Dupré, Peter Galison, and Ian Hacking. In the 2000s, a "Minnesota School" emerged following a 2002 workshop at the University of Minnesota's Center for the Philosophy of Science, including Stephen Kellert, Helen Longino, and C. Kenneth Waters. These authors criticized some arguments from earlier pluralists, while also arguing that pluralism should be accepted as a standard approach to science. These newer pluralists also sought to address areas outside those traditionally disputed with unity of science proponents, including metascientific and metaphilosophical concerns.

By the 2010s, support of scientific pluralism had become a more common position among philosophers of science than support of the unity of science.

== Varieties of pluralism ==
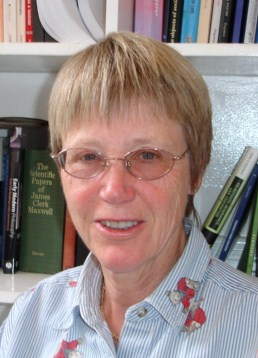
Stanford School philosopher Nancy Cartwright has written in support of scientific pluralism.

Scientific pluralists vary in regard to what aspects of science they believe are not unified. Pluralists who believe in metaphysical differences within the subject matter of science hold that unity of science is inherently impossible. In the words of pluralist Nancy Cartwright, they reject the "fundamentalist doctrine" that "all facts must belong to one grand scheme". The posited impact of these differences depends on the specific metaphysical differences proposed. Opponents of reductionism, for example, say that sciences such as sociology and psychology cannot be fully unified with physics because they involve different levels of facts that cannot be reduced to one another. However, in this model there may be unity within each discipline. In contrast, some pluralists posit that there may be multiple types of causality, so that a discipline such as physics might need different methods for understanding entities with deterministic behaviors versus those with probabilistic behaviors.

Another focus of pluralism is on the epistemology of science. Some pluralists focus on the difficulties of relating material from different scientific disciplines. Even if reductionist metaphysics are accepted in theory, it may be impossible in practice to explain, for example, large-scale social behaviors by reference to the behavior of subatomic particles, given the amount of information that would be required. Other pluralists do not dismiss the possibility of such an explanation at an epistemological level, but say that given the varied research methods and theoretical models actually used in different disciplines (and sometimes even within a discipline), the burden of proof is on the unifiers to provide empirical evidence of unity across them. In the absence of that evidence, these pluralists believe it makes more sense for scientists to use the methods and models that appear to be most effective for their work, without any special consideration for theories of unity.

Some proponents of scientific pluralism argue that it should be adopted for social, ethical, and political reasons. For example, Sandra Harding says that a unified model of science invariably means on one based on Western culture, which leads to "destruction of the resources and the rights of other cultures" and only "an intensely authoritarian global society" could actually impose a single view of science across all cultures. Some pluralists expect pluralism to provide more opportunities for previously marginalized groups to participate, and more opportunity for airing of scientific dissent.
