= Explanation =

Set of statements constructed to describe a set of facts which clarifies causes

An explanation is a set of statements usually constructed to describe a set of facts that clarifies the causes, context, and consequences of those facts. It may establish rules or laws, and clarifies the existing rules or laws in relation to any objects or phenomena examined.

In philosophy, an explanation is a set of statements which render understandable the existence or occurrence of an object, event, or state of affairs. Among its most common forms are:

- Causal explanation
- Deductive-nomological explanation, involves subsuming the explanandum under a generalization from which it may be derived in a deductive argument. For example, “All gases expand when heated; this gas was heated; therefore, this gas expanded".
- Statistical explanation, involves subsuming the explanandum under a generalization that gives it inductive support. For example, “Most people who use tobacco contract cancer; this person used tobacco; therefore, this person contracted cancer”.

Explanations of human behavior usually rely to the subject’s beliefs, desires and other relevant facts. They operate under the assumption that the behavior in question is rational to some extent. Thus an explanation of why the subject removed his coat might cite the fact that he felt hot and desired to feel cooler, and believed that he would feel cooler if he took off his coat.

== Scientific explanation ==
The recent discussions presuppose that science offers explanations (rather than mere description) and that the task of a theory or model of scientific explanation is to outline the structure of such explanations. It is thus assumed that there is a single kind or form of explanation that is “scientific”. In fact, the notion of “scientific explanation” suggests a contrast between those "explanations", that are characteristic of "science" and those which are outside the science, and second a contrast between "explanation" and something else.

However, the tendency in much of the recent philosophical literature has been to assume that there is a substantial continuity between the sorts of explanations found in science and at least some forms of explanation found in more ordinary non-scientific contexts, with the latter embodying in a more or less inchoate way features that are present in a more detailed, precise, rigorous etc. form in the former. It is further assumed that it is the task of a theory of explanation to capture what is common to both scientific and at least some more ordinary forms of explanation.

A notable theory of scientific explanation is Hempel's Deductive-nomological model. This model has been widely criticized but it is still the starting point for discussion of most theories of explanation.

== Explanations vs. arguments ==
The difference between explanations and arguments reflects a difference in the kind of question that arises. In the case of arguments, we start from a doubted fact, which we try to support by arguments. In the case of explanations, we start with an accepted fact, the question being why is this fact or what caused it. The answer here is the explanation.

While arguments attempt to show that something is, will be, or should be the case, explanations try to show why or how something is or will be. If Fred and Joe address the issue of whether Fred's cat has fleas, Joe may state: "Fred, your cat has fleas. Observe the cat is scratching right now." Joe has made an argument that the cat has fleas. However, if Fred and Joe agree on the fact that the cat has fleas, they may further question why this is so and put forth an explanation: "The reason the cat has fleas is that the weather has been damp." The difference is that the attempt is not to settle whether some claim, proposition, or premise is true, but to show why it is true. In this sense, arguments aim to contribute knowledge, whereas explanations aim to contribute understanding.

Arguments and explanations largely resemble each other in rhetorical use. This is the cause of much difficulty in thinking critically about claims. There are several reasons for this difficulty.

- People often are not themselves clear on whether they are arguing for or explaining something.
- The same types of words and phrases are used in presenting explanations and arguments.
- The terms 'explain' or 'explanation,' et cetera are frequently used in arguments.
- Explanations are often used within arguments and presented so as to serve as arguments.

== Explanation vs. justification ==
The term "explanation" is sometimes used in the context of justification, e.g., the explanation as to why a belief is true. Justification may be understood as the explanation as to why a belief is a true one or an account of how one knows what one knows. It is important to be aware when an explanation is not a justification. One may give a detailed and believable account on something without giving a single proof.

== Types ==
There are many and varied events, objects, and facts which require explanation. So too, there are many different things that can be used to explain something. Aristotle recognized four archetypes of explanation. These were thought, since even more ancient times, to be universal and unique 'kinds' of explanation that comprise all ways of explaining something. However, there is much confusion about their precise definition and how they relate to each other. Types of explanation involve appropriate types of reasoning, such as Deductive-nomological, Functional, Historical, Psychological, Reductive, Teleological, Methodological explanations.

== Theories of explanation ==
- Deductive-nomological model
- Statistical relevance model
- Causal Mechanical model
- Unificationist model
- Pragmatic theories of explanation: a pragmatic approach to explanation holds that explanations are whatever people will accept as answers to certain questions.

== See also ==
- Abductive reasoning
- Epistemology
- Explanandum and explanans
- Explanatory gap
- Inductive reasoning
- Inquiry
- Knowledge
- Models of scientific inquiry
- Rationalization
- Scientific method
- Theory
- Unexplained (disambiguation)
- Wesley Salmon
