= Unity of science =

Theory in the philosophy of science

The unity of science is a thesis in philosophy of science that says that all the sciences form a unified whole. The variants of the thesis can be classified as ontological (giving a unified account of the structure of reality) and/or as epistemic/pragmatic (giving a unified account of how the activities and products of science work). There are also philosophers who emphasize the disunity of science, which does not necessarily imply that there could be no unity in some sense but does emphasize pluralism in the ontology and/or practice of science.

Early versions of the unity of science thesis can be found in ancient Greek philosophers such as Aristotle, and in the later history of Western philosophy. For example, in the first half of the 20th century the thesis was associated with the unity of science movement led by Otto Neurath, and in the second half of the century the thesis was advocated by Ludwig von Bertalanffy in "General System Theory: A New Approach to Unity of Science" (1951) and by Paul Oppenheim and Hilary Putnam in "Unity of Science as a Working Hypothesis" (1958). It has been opposed by, for example, Jerry Fodor in "Special Sciences (Or: The Disunity of Science as a Working Hypothesis)" (1974), by Paul Feyerabend in Against Method (1975) and later works, by John Dupré in "The Disunity of Science" (1983) and The Disorder of Things: Metaphysical Foundations of the Disunity of Science (1993), by Nancy Cartwright in The Dappled World: A Study of the Boundaries of Science (1999) and other works, and by Evelyn Fox Keller in Making Sense of Life: Explaining Biological Development with Models, Metaphors, and Machines (2002) and other works.

Jean Piaget suggested, in his 1918 book Recherche and later works, that the unity of science can be considered in terms of a circle of the sciences, where logic is the foundation for mathematics, which is the foundation for mechanics and physics, and physics is the foundation for chemistry, which is the foundation for biology, which is the foundation for sociology, the moral sciences, psychology, and the theory of knowledge, and the theory of knowledge forms a basis for logic, completing the circle, without implying that any science could be reduced to any other.

Many complex systems are considered to be transdisciplinary objects of study. Such systems can be modeled as having emergent properties at different levels of organization or different explanations at different spatial and temporal scales, which do not neatly correspond to separate disciplines such as physics or biology, and which feature causal interaction and nonlinear behavior across levels or scales. Higher-level organization depends on lower-level mechanisms, but higher-level patterns can have explanatory autonomy. Therefore, such systems cannot be adequately modeled using a philosophy of extreme reductionism ("everything comes from the bottom", which does not fully account for emergent properties) or extreme holism ("everything comes from the top", which does not fully account for systems' components and interactions).

== See also ==
- Consilience
- Hierarchy of sciences
- International Encyclopedia of Unified Science
- Logical positivism
- Scientific pluralism
- Special sciences
- Stanford School
- Systems theory
- Tektology
- The central science
- Theory of everything
- Unified Science
