= Models of scientific inquiry =

Models of scientific inquiry have two functions: first, to provide a descriptive account of how scientific inquiry is carried out in practice, and second, to provide an explanatory account of why scientific inquiry succeeds as well as it appears in generating consistent and highly practical models. The philosopher Wesley C. Salmon described scientific inquiry:

The search for scientific knowledge ends far back into antiquity. At some point in the past, at least by the time of Aristotle, philosophers recognized that a fundamental distinction should be drawn between two kinds of scientific knowledge—roughly, knowledge that and knowledge why. It is one thing to know that each planet periodically reverses the direction of its motion with respect to the background of fixed stars; it is quite a different matter to know why. Knowledge of the former type is descriptive; knowledge of the latter type is explanatory. It is explanatory knowledge that provides scientific understanding of the world. (Salmon, 2006, pg. 3)

According to the National Research Council (United States): "Scientific inquiry refers to the diverse ways in which scientists study the natural world and propose explanations based on the evidence derived from their work."

== Accounts of scientific inquiry ==
=== Classical model ===
The classical model of scientific inquiry derives from Aristotle, who distinguished the forms of approximate and exact reasoning, set out the threefold scheme of abductive, deductive, and inductive inference, and also treated the compound forms such as reasoning by analogy.

=== Logical empiricism ===
Wesley Salmon (1989) began his historical survey of scientific explanation with what he called the received view, as it was received from Hempel and Oppenheim in the years beginning with their Studies in the Logic of Explanation (1948) and culminating in Hempel's Aspects of Scientific Explanation (1965). Salmon summed up his analysis of these developments by means of the following Table.

In this classification, a deductive-nomological (D-N) explanation of an occurrence is a valid deduction whose conclusion states that the outcome to be explained did in fact occur. The deductive argument is called an explanation, its premisses are called the explanans (L: explaining) and the conclusion is called the explanandum (L: to be explained). Depending on a number of additional qualifications, an explanation may be ranked on a scale from potential to true.

Not all explanations in science are of the D-N type, however. An inductive-statistical (I-S) explanation accounts for an occurrence by subsuming it under statistical laws, rather than categorical or universal laws, and the mode of subsumption is itself inductive instead of deductive. The D-N type can be seen as a limiting case of the more general I-S type, the measure of certainty involved being complete, or probability 1, in the former case, whereas it is less than complete, probability < 1, in the latter case.

In this view, the D-N mode of reasoning, in addition to being used to explain particular occurrences, can also be used to explain general regularities, simply by deducing them from still more general laws.

Finally, the deductive-statistical (D-S) type of explanation, properly regarded as a subclass of the D-N type, explains statistical regularities by deduction from more comprehensive statistical laws. (Salmon 1989, pp. 8–9).

Such was the received view of scientific explanation from the point of view of logical empiricism, that Salmon says "held sway" during the third quarter of the last century (Salmon, p. 10).

== Choice of a theory ==
During the course of history, one theory has succeeded another, and some have suggested further work while others have seemed content just to explain the phenomena. The reasons why one theory has replaced another are not always obvious or simple. The philosophy of science includes the question: What criteria are satisfied by a 'good' theory. This question has a long history, and many scientists, as well as philosophers, have considered it. The objective is to be able to choose one theory as preferable to another without introducing cognitive bias. Several often proposed criteria were summarized by Colyvan. A good theory:

1. contains few arbitrary elements (simplicity/parsimony);
2. agrees with and explains all existing observations (unificatory/explanatory power) and makes detailed predictions about future observations that can disprove or falsify the theory if they are not borne out;
3. is fruitful, where the emphasis by Colyvan is not only upon prediction and falsification, but also upon a theory's seminality in suggesting future work;
4. is elegant (formal elegance; no ad hoc modifications).

Stephen Hawking supported items 1, 2 and 4, but did not mention fruitfulness. On the other hand, Kuhn emphasizes the importance of seminality.

The goal here is to make the choice between theories less arbitrary. Nonetheless, these criteria contain subjective elements, and are heuristics rather than part of scientific method. Also, criteria such as these do not necessarily decide between alternative theories. Quoting Bird:

"They [such criteria] cannot determine scientific choice. First, which features of a theory satisfy these criteria may be disputable (e.g. does simplicity concern the ontological commitments of a theory or its mathematical form?). Secondly, these criteria are imprecise, and so there is room for disagreement about the degree to which they hold. Thirdly, there can be disagreement about how they are to be weighted relative to one another, especially when they conflict."

— Alexander Bird, Methodological incommensurability

It also is debatable whether existing scientific theories satisfy all these criteria, which may represent goals not yet achieved. For example, explanatory power over all existing observations (criterion 3) is satisfied by no one theory at the moment.

Whatever might be the ultimate goals of some scientists, science, as it is currently practiced, depends on multiple overlapping descriptions of the world, each of which has a domain of applicability. In some cases this domain is very large, but in others quite small.

— E.B. Davies, Epistemological pluralism, p. 4

The desiderata of a "good" theory have been debated for centuries, going back perhaps even earlier than Occam's razor, which often is taken as an attribute of a good theory. Occam's razor might fall under the heading of "elegance", the first item on the list, but too zealous an application was cautioned by Albert Einstein: "Everything should be made as simple as possible, but no simpler." It is arguable that parsimony and elegance "typically pull in different directions". The falsifiability item on the list is related to the criterion proposed by Popper as demarcating a scientific theory from a theory like astrology: both "explain" observations, but the scientific theory takes the risk of making predictions that decide whether it is right or wrong:

"It must be possible for an empirical scientific system to be refuted by experience."

"Those among us who are unwilling to expose their ideas to the hazard of refutation do not take part in the game of science."

— Karl Popper, The Logic of Scientific Discovery, p. 18 and p. 280

Thomas Kuhn argued that changes in scientists' views of reality not only contain subjective elements, but result from group dynamics, "revolutions" in scientific practice which result in paradigm shifts. As an example, Kuhn suggested that the heliocentric "Copernican Revolution" replaced the geocentric views of Ptolemy not because of empirical failures, but because of a new "paradigm" that exerted control over what scientists felt to be the more fruitful way to pursue their goals.

== Aspects of scientific inquiry ==
=== Deduction and induction ===
Deductive reasoning and inductive reasoning are quite different in their approaches.

==== Deduction ====
Deductive reasoning is the reasoning of proof, or logical implication. It is the logic used in mathematics and other axiomatic systems such as formal logic. In a deductive system, there will be axioms (postulates) which are not proven. Indeed, they cannot be proven without circularity. There will also be primitive terms which are not defined, as they cannot be defined without circularity. For example, one can define a line as a set of points, but to then define a point as the intersection of two lines would be circular. Because of these interesting characteristics of formal systems, Bertrand Russell humorously referred to mathematics as "the field where we don't know what we are talking about, nor whether or not what we say is true". All theorems and corollaries are proven by exploring the implications of the axiomata and other theorems that have previously been developed. New terms are defined using the primitive terms and other derived definitions based on those primitive terms.

In a deductive system, one can correctly use the term "proof", as applying to a theorem. To say that a theorem is proven means that it is impossible for the axioms to be true and the theorem to be false. For example, we could do a simple syllogism such as the following:

1. Arches National Park lies within the state of Utah.
2. I am standing in Arches National Park.
3. Therefore, I am standing in the state of Utah.

Notice that it is not possible (assuming all of the trivial qualifying criteria are supplied) to be in Arches and not be in Utah. However, one can be in Utah while not in Arches National Park. The implication only works in one direction. Statements (1) and (2) taken together imply statement (3). Statement (3) does not imply anything about statements (1) or (2). Notice that we have not proven statement (3), but we have shown that statements (1) and (2) together imply statement (3). In mathematics, what is proven is not the truth of a particular theorem, but that the axioms of the system imply the theorem. In other words, it is impossible for the axioms to be true and the theorem to be false. The strength of deductive systems is that they are sure of their results. The weakness is that they are abstract constructs which are, unfortunately, one step removed from the physical world. They are very useful, however, as mathematics has provided great insights into natural science by providing useful models of natural phenomena. One result is the development of products and processes that benefit mankind.

==== Induction ====
===== Inductive generalization =====
Learning about the physical world often involves the use of inductive reasoning. It is useful in enterprises as science and crime scene detective work. One makes a set of specific observations, and seeks to make a general principle based on those observations, which will point to certain other observations that would naturally result from either a repeat of the experiment or making more observations from a slightly different set of circumstances. If the predicted observations hold true, one may be on the right track. However, the general principle has not been proven. The principle implies that certain observations should follow, but positive observations do not imply the principle. It is quite possible that some other principle could also account for the known observations, and may do better with future experiments. The implication flows in only one direction, as in the syllogism used in the discussion on deduction. Therefore, it is never correct to say that a scientific principle or hypothesis/theory has been "proven" in the rigorous sense of proof used in deductive systems.

A classic example of this is the study of gravitation. Newton formed a law for gravitation stating that the force of gravitation is directly proportional to the product of the two masses and inversely proportional to the square of the distance between them. For over 170 years, all observations seemed to validate his equation. However, telescopes eventually became powerful enough to see a slight discrepancy in the orbit of Mercury. Scientists tried everything imaginable to explain the discrepancy, but they could not do so using the objects that would bear on the orbit of Mercury. Eventually, Einstein developed his theory of general relativity and it explained the orbit of Mercury and all other known observations dealing with gravitation. During the long period of time when scientists were making observations that seemed to validate Newton's theory, they did not, in fact, prove his theory to be true. However, it must have seemed at the time that they did. It only took one counterexample (Mercury's orbit) to prove that there was something wrong with his theory.

This is typical of inductive reasoning. All of the observations that seem to validate the theory, do not prove its truth. But one counter-example can prove it false. That means that deductive logic is used in the evaluation of a theory. In other words, if A implies B, then not B implies not A. Einstein's theory of General Relativity has been supported by many observations using the best scientific instruments and experiments. However, his theory now has the same status as Newton's theory of gravitation prior to seeing the problems in the orbit of Mercury. It is highly credible and validated with all we know, but it is not proven. It is only the best we have at this point in time.

Another example of correct scientific reasoning is shown in the current search for the Higgs boson. Scientists on the Compact Muon Solenoid experiment at the Large Hadron Collider have conducted experiments yielding data suggesting the existence of the Higgs boson. However, realizing that the results could possibly be explained as a background fluctuation and not the Higgs boson, they are cautious and waiting for further data from future experiments. Said Guido Tonelli:

"We cannot exclude the presence of the Standard Model Higgs between 115 and 127 GeV because of a modest excess of events in this mass region that appears, quite consistently, in five independent channels [...] As of today what we see is consistent either with a background fluctuation or with the presence of the boson."

One way of describing scientific method would then contain these steps as a minimum:

1. Make a set of observations regarding the phenomenon being studied.
2. Form a hypothesis that might explain the observations. (This may involve inductive and/or abductive reasoning.)
3. Identify the implications and outcomes that must follow, if the hypothesis is to be true.
4. Perform other experiments or observations to see if any of the predicted outcomes fail.
5. If any predicted outcomes fail, the hypothesis is proven false since if A implies B, then not B implies not A (by deduction). It is then necessary to change the hypothesis and go back to step 3. If the predicted outcomes are confirmed, the hypothesis is not proved, but rather can be said to be consistent with known data.

When a hypothesis has survived a sufficient number of tests, it may be promoted to a scientific theory. A theory is a hypothesis that has survived many tests and seems to be consistent with other established scientific theories. Since a theory is a promoted hypothesis, it is of the same 'logical' species and shares the same logical limitations. Just as a hypothesis cannot be proven but can be disproved, that same is true for a theory. It is a difference of degree, not kind.

===== Argument from analogy =====
Arguments from analogy are another type of inductive reasoning. In arguing from analogy, one infers that since two things are alike in several respects, they are likely to be alike in another respect. This is, of course, an assumption. It is natural to attempt to find similarities between two phenomena and wonder what one can learn from those similarities. However, to notice that two things share attributes in several respects does not imply any similarities in other respects. It is possible that the observer has already noticed all of the attributes that are shared and any other attributes will be distinct. Argument from analogy is an unreliable method of reasoning that can lead to erroneous conclusions, and thus cannot be used to establish scientific facts.

== See also ==
- Deductive-nomological
- Explanandum and explanans
- Hypothetico-deductive method
- Inquiry
