= Wesley C. Salmon =

American philosopher of science

- Born: Wesley Charles Salmon; August 9, 1925; Detroit, Michigan, U.S.
- Died: April 22, 2001 (aged 75); Madison County, Ohio, U.S.

Education
- Education: Wayne State University; University of Chicago; UCLA (PhD, 1950)
- Doctoral advisor: Hans Reichenbach

Philosophical work
- Era: Contemporary philosophy
- Region: Western philosophy
- School: Analytic; Logical empiricism
- Institutions: Brown University; Indiana University Bloomington
- Doctoral students: Clark Glymour; James H. Moor
- Main interests: Confirmation theory, philosophy of science, metaphysics
- Notable ideas: Statistical-relevance model, the requirement of strict maximal specificity, mark transmission

Wesley Charles Salmon (/ˈsæmən/; August 9, 1925 – April 22, 2001) was an American philosopher of science renowned for his work on the nature of scientific explanation. He also worked on confirmation theory, trying to explicate how probability theory via inductive logic might help confirm and choose hypotheses. Yet most prominently, Salmon was a realist about causality in scientific explanation, although his realist explanation of causality drew ample criticism. Still, his books on scientific explanation itself were landmarks of the 20th century's philosophy of science, and solidified recognition of causality's important roles in scientific explanation, whereas causality itself has evaded satisfactory elucidation by anyone.

Under logical empiricism's influence, especially Carl Hempel's work on the "covering law" model of scientific explanation, most philosophers had viewed scientific explanation as stating regularities, but not identifying causes. To replace the covering law model's inductive-statistical model (IS model), Salmon introduced the statistical-relevance model (SR model), and proposed the requirement of strict maximal specificity to supplement the covering law model's other component, the deductive-nomological model (DN model). Yet ultimately, Salmon held statistical models to be but early stages, and lawlike regularities to be insufficient, in scientific explanation. Salmon proposed that scientific explanation's manner is actually causal/mechanical explanation.

== Education and career ==
Salmon attended Wayne State University, then received a master's degree in 1947 from the University of Chicago. At UCLA, under Hans Reichenbach, Salmon earned a PhD in philosophy in 1950. He was on Brown University's faculty from 1955 until 1963, when he joined the History and Philosophy of Science Department of Indiana University Bloomington where Norwood Russell Hanson was Professor until he and his wife Merrilee moved to Arizona in 1973. Salmon left the University of Arizona to join the University of Pittsburgh's Department of Philosophy, among the most prestigious, in 1981, where he was professor and chairperson until 1983 upon succeeding Carl Hempel as University Professor. Salmon retired in 1999.

Salmon authored over 100 papers. For decades, his introductory textbook Logic was a standard, widely used, that went through multiple editions and was translated into several languages, including Chinese, French, German, Italian, Japanese, and Spanish. Salmon was president of the Philosophy of Science Association from 1971 to 1972, and president of the American Philosophical Association's Pacific Division from 1977 to 1978. In 1988, at the University of Bologna, for its 900th anniversary, he gave a four-lecture series, "Four decades of scientific explanation", whereupon, taking Italian courses at University of Pittsburgh, Salmon mastered Italian and gave lectures at several other universities in Italy. From 1998 to 1999, he was president of the International Union of History and Philosophy of Science, sponsored by UNESCO. Salmon was a fellow of the American Academy of Arts and Sciences. In 2001, traveling with his wife Merilee, also a philosopher of science, Wesley Salmon died suddenly in a car crash, though she was uninjured.

== Philosophical work ==
=== Confirmation theory ===
Starting in 1983, Salmon became interested in theory choice in science, and sought to resolve the enduring conflict between the logical empiricist view, whereby theories undergo a logical process of confirmation and comparison, as against the Kuhnian historical perspective, whereby theory choice and comparison are troubled by incommensurability, the inability of scientists to even effectively communicate and compare theories across differing paradigms. Recognizing that Kuhn's 1962 thesis in Structure of Scientific Revolutions was largely misunderstood—that Kuhn had not meant that scientific theory change is irrational but merely relative to the scientific community where the change occurs—Salmon believed that Bayesianism, which quantifies decisionmaking via subjective probability or "degree of belief", could help close the seemingly unbridgeable gap between the logical empiricist view versus the Kuhnian historical view of theory choice and change.

=== Scientific explanation ===
==== Humean empiricism ====
According to the empiricist view associated with the 18th-century Scottish philosopher David Hume, we do not actually observe causes and effects, but merely experience constant conjunction of sensory events, and impute causality between the observations. More precisely, one finds merely counterfactual causality—that altering condition A prevents or produces state B—but finds no further causal relation between A and B, since one has witnessed no either logical or natural necessity connecting A and B.

In the 20th century, as a formula to scientifically answer Why? questions, logical empiricist Carl Hempel and Paul Oppenheim explicated the deductive-nomological model (DN model). Concerning deterministic laws, the DN model characterizes scientific explanation as a logical form, whereby initial conditions plus universal laws entail an outcome via deductive inference, but no reference to causal relations. Concerning ceteris paribus, which are probabilistic, not deterministic, Hempel introduced the inductive-statistical model (IS model). The IS model, too, indicates correlations, not causation.

==== Relevance/specificity ====
By 1970, Salmon had found that when seeking to explain probabilistic phenomena, we seek not merely high probability, but screen for causal influence by removing components of a system to find ones that alter the probability. Salmon sought to replace Hempel's IS model with Salmon's statistical-relevance model (SR model).

In 1948 when explicating DN model, Carl Hempel and Paul Oppenheim had stated scientific explanation's semiformal conditions of adequacy (CA), but acknowledged redundancy of the third, empirical content (CA3), implied by the other three: derivability (CA1), lawlikeness (CA2), and truth (CA4). In the early 1980s, Salmon called for returning cause to because, and helped replace CA3 empirical content with CA3' strict maximal specificity. Yet ultimately, Salmon found mere modifications to the covering law model to be unsatisfactory.

==== Causal mechanism ====
As conventionally conceived by philosophers of science, scientific explanation of a phenomenon was simply epistemic (concerning knowledge), and centered on the phenomenon's counterfactual derivability from initial conditions plus natural laws (Hempel's covering law model). Yet Salmon found causality ubiquitous in scientific explanation, which identifies not only natural laws (empirical regularities), but accounts for them via nature's structure and thereby involves the ontic (concerning reality), how the phenomenon "fits into the causal nexus" of the world (Salmon's causal/mechanical explanation). For instance, Boyle's law relates temperature, pressure, and volume of an ideal gas (epistemic), but this was later reduced to laws of statistical mechanics via average kinetic energy of colliding molecules composing the gas (ontic). Thus, Salmon finds scientific explanation to be not merely nomological—that is, lawlike—but rather ontological, or causal/mechanical. Though asserting the primacy of causal/mechanical explanation, Salmon was vague as to how scientists can attain it. Still, consensus among philosophers of science is that causation is central in scientific explanation.

=== Metaphysics of causality ===
==== Mark transmission ====
In metaphysics, Salmon sought a "process theory" of causality to model "causality without counterfactuals", yet meet the "Humean empirical strictures". Salmon criticized Bertrand Russell's theory of causal lines—forerunner of today's theories of causal processes—for involving the epistemic but neglecting the ontic, which causation is. Further, Hans Reichenbach had noted that Russell's causal lines must be distinguished from "unreal sequences": continuous phenomena that actually are not causal processes. Salmon's explanation of causal processes drew a number of criticisms, whereupon Salmon explained that causal processes and causal interactions are "the basic causal mechanisms", while causal interactions are more fundamental than causal processes, but causal processes were discussed first for practical reasons.

Salmon explained causal processes as "the means by which causal influence is transmitted", and thus what "constitute precisely the objective physical causal connections which Hume sought in vain". Salmon explained that causal processes can transmit a mark or can transmit structure in a way continuous spatiotemporally. Thereby, the marking principle sorts causal processes from pseudo processes (Reichenbach's "unreal sequences"). Marking a causal process modifies it, a mark not transmitted by a pseudo process. Meanwhile, causal forks are "the means by which causal structure is generated and modified". Others have found Salmon's theory of mark transmission to have shortcomings, however, whereby it can fail to discern causal processes from pseudo processes.

== Bibliography ==
- Logic (1963)
- The Foundations of Scientific Inference (1967)
- Statistical Evidence and Statistical Relevance (1971)
- Space, Time, and Motion: A Philosophical Introduction (1975)
- Scientific Explanation and the Causal Structure of the World (1984)
- Four Decades of Scientific Explanation (1990)
- Causality and Explanation (1998)
