= The central science =

Term often associated with chemistry

Partial ordering of the sciences proposed by Balaban and Klein

Chemistry is often called the central science because of its role in connecting the physical sciences, which include chemistry, with the life sciences, pharmaceutical sciences and applied sciences such as medicine and engineering. The nature of this relationship is one of the main topics in the philosophy of chemistry and in scientometrics. The phrase was popularized by its use in a textbook by Theodore L. Brown and H. Eugene LeMay, titled Chemistry: The Central Science, which was first published in 1977, with a fifteenth edition published in 2021.

The central role of chemistry can be seen in the systematic and hierarchical classification of the sciences by Auguste Comte. Each discipline provides a more general framework for the area it precedes (mathematics → astronomy → physics → chemistry → biology → social sciences). Balaban and Klein have more recently proposed a diagram showing the partial ordering of sciences in which chemistry may be argued is "the central science" since it provides a significant degree of branching. In forming these connections the lower field cannot be fully reduced to the higher ones. It is recognized that the lower fields possess emergent ideas and concepts that do not exist in the higher fields of science.

Thus chemistry is built on an understanding of laws of physics that govern particles such as atoms, protons, neutrons, electrons, thermodynamics, etc. although it has been shown that it has not been "fully 'reduced' to quantum mechanics". Concepts such as the periodicity of the elements and chemical bonds in chemistry are emergent in that they are more than the underlying forces defined by physics.

In the same way, biology cannot be fully reduced to chemistry, although the machinery that is responsible for life is composed of molecules. For instance, the machinery of evolution may be described in terms of chemistry by the understanding that it is a mutation in the order of genetic base pairs in the DNA of an organism. However, chemistry cannot fully describe the process since it does not contain concepts such as natural selection that are responsible for driving evolution. Chemistry is fundamental to biology since it provides a methodology for studying and understanding the molecules that compose cells.

Connections made by chemistry are formed through various sub-disciplines that utilize concepts from multiple scientific disciplines. Chemistry and physics are both needed in the areas of physical chemistry, nuclear chemistry, and theoretical chemistry. Chemistry and biology intersect in the areas of biochemistry, medicinal chemistry, molecular biology, chemical biology, molecular genetics, and immunochemistry. Chemistry and the earth sciences intersect in areas like geochemistry and hydrology.

== See also ==
- Fundamental science
- Hard and soft science
- Philosophy of chemistry
- Special sciences
- Unity of science
