= Explanandum and explanans =

Latin terms

An explanandum (a Latin term) is a sentence describing a phenomenon that is to be explained, and the explanans are the sentences adduced as explanations of that phenomenon. For example, one person may pose an explanandum by asking "Why is there smoke?", and another may provide an explanans by responding "Because there is a fire". In this example, "smoke" is the explanandum, and "fire" is the explanans.

Carl Gustav Hempel and Paul Oppenheim (1948), in their deductive-nomological model of scientific explanation, explored the distinction between explanans and explanandum in order to answer why-questions, rather than simply what-questions:

"It may be said... that an explanation is not fully adequate unless its explanans, if taken account of in time, could have served as a basis for predicting the phenomenon under consideration.... It is this potential predictive force which gives scientific explanation its importance: Only to the extent that we are able to explain empirical facts can we attain the major objective of scientific research, namely not merely to record the phenomena of our experience, but to learn from them, by basing upon them theoretical generalizations which enable us to anticipate new occurrences and to control, at least to some extent, the changes in our environment."

— Hempel & Oppenheim, 1948, (p.138)
