= Logical positivism =

Movement in Western philosophy

Collage of prominent figures associated with logical positivism / logical empiricism. From left to right, top to bottom: Moritz Schlick, Rudolf Carnap, Otto Neurath, Hans Hahn, Friedrich Waismann, Herbert Feigl, Hans Reichenbach, Carl Gustav Hempel, and A. J. Ayer.

Logical positivism (also known as logical empiricism or neo-positivism) was a philosophical movement rooted in the empiricist tradition, seeking to formulate a scientific philosophy in which philosophical discourse proves as authoritative and meaningful as empirical science.

A central thesis endorsed by some logical positivists (e.g. Moritz Schlick) and rejected by others (e.g. Rudolf Carnap and Otto Neurath) was the verification principle, also known as the "verifiability criterion of meaning", according to which a statement is cognitively meaningful only if it can be verified through empirical observation or if it is a tautology (true by virtue of its own meaning or its own logical form). The verifiability criterion thus rejected statements of metaphysics, theology, ethics and aesthetics as cognitively meaningless in terms of truth value or factual content. Despite its ambition to overhaul philosophy by mimicking the structure and process of empirical science, logical positivism became erroneously stereotyped as an agenda to regulate the scientific process and to place strict standards on it.

The movement emerged in the late 1920s among philosophers, scientists and mathematicians congregated within the Vienna Circle and the Berlin Circle and flourished in several European centres through the 1930s. By the end of World War II, many of its members had settled in the English-speaking world and the project shifted to less radical goals within the philosophy of science.

By the 1950s, problems identified within logical positivism's central tenets became seen as intractable, drawing escalating criticism among leading philosophers, notably from Willard Van Orman Quine and Karl Popper, and even from within the movement, from Carl Hempel. These problems would remain unresolved, precipitating the movement's eventual decline and abandonment by the 1960s. In 1967, philosopher John Passmore pronounced logical positivism "dead, or as dead as a philosophical movement ever becomes".

== Origins ==
Logical positivism emerged in Germany and Austria amid a cultural background characterised by the dominance of Hegelian metaphysics and the work of Hegelian successors such as F. H. Bradley, whose metaphysics portrayed the world without reference to empirical observation. The late 19th century also saw the emergence of neo-Kantianism as a philosophical movement, in the rationalist tradition.

The logical positivist program established its theoretical foundations in the empiricism of David Hume, Auguste Comte and Ernst Mach, along with the positivism of Comte and Mach, defining its exemplar of science in Einstein's general theory of relativity. In accordance with Mach's phenomenalism, whereby material objects exist only as sensory stimuli rather than as observable entities in the real world, logical positivists took all scientific knowledge to be only sensory experience. Further influence came from Percy Bridgman's operationalism—whereby a concept is not knowable unless it can be measured experimentally—as well as Immanuel Kant's perspectives on aprioricity.

Ludwig Wittgenstein's Tractatus Logico-Philosophicus established the theoretical foundations for the verifiability principle. His work introduced the view of philosophy as "critique of language", discussing theoretical distinctions between intelligible and nonsensical discourse. Tractatus adhered to a correspondence theory of truth, as opposed to a coherence theory of truth. Logical positivists were also influenced by Wittgenstein's interpretation of probability though, according to Neurath, some objected to the metaphysics in Tractatus.

== History ==
=== Vienna and Berlin Circles ===
The Vienna Circle was led principally by Moritz Schlick, congregating around the University of Vienna and at the Café Central. A manifesto written by Otto Neurath, Hans Hahn, and Rudolf Carnap in 1929, titled Wissenschaftliche Weltauffassung: Der Wiener Kreis (The Scientific Conception of the World: The Vienna Circle), summarised the philosophical positions of the Vienna Circle. Schlick had originally held a neo-Kantian position, but later converted, via Carnap's 1928 book Der logische Aufbau der Welt (The Logical Structure of the World). The Viennese maintained closely cooperative ties with the Berlin Circle, among whom Hans Reichenbach was pre-eminent. Carl Hempel, who studied under Reichenbach in Germany, was also to prove influential in the movement's later history. A friendly but tenacious critic of the movement was Karl Popper, whom Neurath nicknamed the "Official Opposition".

Early in the movement, Carnap, Hahn, Neurath and others recognised that the verifiability criterion was too stringent in that it rejected universal statements, which are vital to scientific hypothesis. A radical left wing emerged from the Vienna Circle, led by Neurath and Carnap, who proposed revisions to weaken the criterion, a program they referred to as the "liberalisation of empiricism". A conservative right wing, led by Schlick and Waismann, instead sought to classify universal statements as analytic truths, thereby reconciling them with the existing criterion. Within the liberal wing Carnap emphasised fallibilism, as well as pragmatics, which he considered integral to empiricism. Neurath prescribed a move from Mach's phenomenalism to physicalism, though this would be opposed by Schlick. As Neurath and Carnap sought to pose science toward social reform, the split in the Vienna Circle also reflected political differences.

Both Schlick and Carnap had been influenced by and sought to define logical positivism versus the neo-Kantianism of Ernst Cassirer, the contemporary leading figure of the Marburg school, and against Edmund Husserl's phenomenology. Logical positivists especially opposed Martin Heidegger's obscure metaphysics, the epitome of what they had rejected through their epistemological doctrines. In the early 1930s, Carnap debated Heidegger over "metaphysical pseudosentences".

=== Anglosphere ===
As the movement's first emissary to the New World, Moritz Schlick visited Stanford University in 1929, yet otherwise remained in Vienna and was murdered in 1936 at the University by a former student, Johann Nelböck, who was reportedly deranged. That year, A. J. Ayer, a British attendee at various Vienna Circle meetings since 1933, published Language, Truth and Logic, which imported logical positivism to the English-speaking world. In 1933, the Nazi Party's rise to power in Germany had triggered the flight of intellectuals, which accelerated upon Germany's annexation of Austria in 1938. The logical positivists, many of whom were Jewish, were targeted and continued their flight throughout the pre-war period. Their philosophy thus became dominant in the English-speaking world.

By the late 1930s, many in the movement had replaced phenomenalism with Neurath's physicalism, whereby material objects are not reducible to sensory stimuli but exist as publicly observable entities in the real world. Neurath settled in England, where he died in 1945. Carnap, Reichenbach and Hempel settled permanently in America.

=== Post-war period ===
Following the Second World War, logical positivism—now referred to by some as logical empiricism—turned to less radical objectives in the philosophy of science. Led by Carl Hempel, who expounded the covering law model of scientific explanation, the movement became a major underpinning of analytic philosophy in the English-speaking world and its influence extended beyond philosophy into the social sciences. At the same time, the movement drew intensifying scrutiny over its central problems and its doctrines were increasingly criticised, most trenchantly by Willard Van Orman Quine, Norwood Hanson, Karl Popper, Thomas Kuhn and Carl Hempel.

== Principles ==
=== Verification and Confirmation ===
==== Verifiability Criterion of Meaning ====
According to the verifiability criterion of meaning, a statement is cognitively meaningful only if it is either verifiable by empirical observation or is an analytic truth (i.e. true by virtue of its own meaning or its own logical form). Cognitive meaningfulness was defined variably: possessing truth value; or corresponding to a possible state of affairs; or intelligible or understandable as are scientific statements. Other types of meaning—for instance, emotive, expressive or figurative—were dismissed from further review.

Metaphysics, theology, as well as much of ethics and aesthetics failed this criterion, and so were found cognitively meaningless and only emotively meaningful (though, notably, Schlick considered ethical and aesthetic statements cognitively meaningful). Ethics and aesthetics were considered subjective preferences, while theology and metaphysics contained "pseudostatements" that were neither true nor false. Thus, logical positivism indirectly asserted Hume's law, the principle that factual statements cannot justify evaluative statements, and that the two are separated by an unbridgeable gap. A. J. Ayer's Language, Truth and Logic (1936) presented an extreme version of this principle—the boo/hooray doctrine—whereby all evaluative judgments are merely emotional reactions.

==== Revisions to the criterion ====
Logical positivists in the Vienna Circle recognised quickly that the verifiability criterion was too restrictive. Specifically, universal statements were noted to be empirically unverifiable, rendering vital domains of science and reason, such as scientific hypothesis, cognitively meaningless under verificationism. This would pose significant problems for the logical positivist program, absent revisions to its criterion of meaning.

In his 1936 and 1937 papers, Testability and Meaning, Carnap proposed confirmation in place of verification, determining that, though universal laws cannot be verified, they can be confirmed. Carnap employed abundant logical and mathematical tools to research an inductive logic that would account for probability according to degrees of confirmation. However, he was never able to formulate a model. In Carnap's inductive logic, a universal law's degree of confirmation was always zero. The formulation of what eventually came to be called the "criterion of cognitive significance", stemming from this research, took three decades (Hempel 1950, Carnap 1956, Carnap 1961). Carl Hempel, who became a prominent critic of the logical positivist movement, elucidated the paradox of confirmation.

In his 1936 book, Language, Truth and Logic, A. J. Ayer distinguished strong and weak verification. He stipulated that, "A proposition is said to be verifiable, in the strong sense of the term, if, and only if, its truth could be conclusively established by experience", but is verifiable in the weak sense "if it is possible for experience to render it probable". He would add that, "no proposition, other than a tautology, can possibly be anything more than a probable hypothesis". Thus, he would conclude that all are open to weak verification.

=== Analytic-synthetic distinction ===
In theories of justification, a priori statements are those that can be known independently of observation, contrasting with a posteriori statements, which are dependent on observation. Statements may also be categorised into analytic and synthetic: Analytic statements are true by virtue of their own meaning or their own logical form, therefore are tautologies that are true by necessity but uninformative about the world. Synthetic statements, in comparison, are contingent propositions that refer to a state of facts concerning the world.

David Hume proposed an unambiguous distinction between analytic and synthetic, categorising knowledge exclusively as either "relations of ideas" (which are a priori, analytic and abstract) or "matters of fact and real existence" (a posteriori, synthetic and concrete), a classification referred to as Hume's fork. Immanuel Kant identified a further category of knowledge: Synthetic a priori statements, which are informative about the world, but known without observation. This principle is encapsulated in Kant's transcendental idealism, which attributes the mind a constructive role in phenomena whereby intuitive truths—including synthetic a priori conceptions of space and time—function as an interpretative filter for an observer's experience of the world. His thesis would serve to rescue Newton's law of universal gravitation from Hume's problem of induction by determining uniformity of nature to be in the category of a priori knowledge.

The Vienna Circle rejected Kant's conception of synthetic a priori knowledge given its incompatibility with the verifiability criterion. Yet, they adopted the Kantian position of defining mathematics and logic—ordinarily considered synthetic truths—as a priori. Carnap's solution to this discrepancy would be to reinterpret logical truths as tautologies, redefining logic as analytic, building upon theoretical foundations established in Wittgenstein's Tractatus. Mathematics, in turn, would be reduced to logic through the logicist approach proposed by Gottlob Frege. In effect, Carnap's reconstruction of analyticity expounded Hume's fork, affirming its analytic-synthetic distinction. This would be critically important in rendering the verification principle compatible with mathematics and logic.

=== Observation-theory distinction ===
Carnap devoted much of his career to the cornerstone doctrine of rational reconstruction, whereby scientific theories can be formalised into predicate logic and the components of a theory categorised into observation terms and theoretical terms. Observation terms are specified by direct observation and thus assumed to have fixed empirical definitions, whereas theoretical terms refer to the unobservables of a theory, including abstract conceptions such as mathematical formulas. The two categories of primitive terms would be interconnected in meaning via a deductive interpretative framework, referred to as correspondence rules.

Early in his research, Carnap postulated that correspondence rules could be used to define theoretical terms from observation terms, contending that scientific knowledge could be unified by reducing theoretical laws to "protocol sentences" grounded in observable facts. He would soon abandon this model of reconstruction, suggesting instead that theoretical terms could be defined implicitly by the axioms of a theory. Furthermore, that observation terms could, in some cases, garner meaning from theoretical terms via correspondence rules. Here, definition is said to be 'implicit' in that the axioms serve to exclude those interpretations that falsify the theory. Thus, axioms define theoretical terms indirectly by restricting the set of possible interpretations to those that are true interpretations.

By reconstructing the semantics of scientific language, Carnap's thesis builds upon earlier research in the reconstruction of syntax, referring to Bertrand Russell's logical atomism—the view that statements in natural language can be converted to standardised subunits of meaning assembled via a logical syntax. Rational reconstruction is sometimes referred to as the received view or syntactic view of theories in the context of subsequent work by Carl Hempel, Ernest Nagel and Herbert Feigl.

=== Logicism ===
By reducing mathematics to logic, Bertrand Russell sought to convert the mathematical formulas of physics to symbolic logic. Gottlob Frege began this program of logicism, continuing it with Russell, but eventually lost interest. Russell then continued it with Alfred North Whitehead in their Principia Mathematica, inspiring some of the more mathematical logical positivists, such as Hans Hahn and Rudolf Carnap.

Carnap's early anti-metaphysical works employed Russell's theory of types. Like Russell, Carnap envisioned a universal language that could reconstruct mathematics and thereby encode physics. Yet Kurt Gödel's incompleteness theorem showed this to be impossible, except in trivial cases, and Alfred Tarski's undefinability theorem finally undermined all hopes of reducing mathematics to logic. Thus, a universal language failed to stem from Carnap's 1934 work Logische Syntax der Sprache (Logical Syntax of Language). Still, some logical positivists, including Carl Hempel, continued to support logicism.

== Philosophy of science ==
The logical positivist movement shed much of its revolutionary zeal following the defeat of Nazism and the decline of rival philosophies that sought radical reform, notably Marburg neo-Kantianism, Husserlian phenomenology and Heidegger's existential hermeneutics. Hosted in the climate of American pragmatism and common sense empiricism, its proponents no longer crusaded to revise traditional philosophy into a radical scientific philosophy, but became respectable members of a new philosophical subdiscipline, philosophy of science. Receiving support from Ernest Nagel, they were especially influential in the social sciences.

=== Scientific explanation ===
Carl Hempel was prominent in the development of the deductive-nomological (DN) model, then the foremost model of scientific explanation defended even among critics of neo-positivism such as Popper. According to the DN model, a scientific explanation is valid only if it takes the form of a deductive inference from a set of explanatory premises (explanans) to the observation or theory to be explained (explanandum). The model stipulates that the premises must refer to at least one law, which it defines as an unrestricted generalization of the conditional form: "If A, then B". Laws therefore differ from mere regularities ("George always carries only $1 bills in his wallet") which do not necessarily support counterfactual claims. Furthermore, laws must be empirically verifiable in compliance with the verification principle.

The DN model ignores causal mechanisms beyond the principle of constant conjunction ("first event A and then always event B") in accordance with the Humean empiricist postulate that, though sequences of events are observable, the underpinning causal principles are not. Hempel stated that well-formulated natural laws (empirically confirmed regularities) are satisfactory in approximating causal explanation.

Hempel later proposed a probabilistic model of scientific explanation: The inductive-statistical (IS) model. Derivation of statistical laws from other statistical laws would further be designated as the deductive-statistical (DS) model. The DN and IS models are collectively referred to as the "covering law model" or "subsumption theory", the latter referring to the movement's stated goals of "theory reduction".

=== Unity of science ===
Logical positivists were committed to the vision of a unified science encompassing all scientific fields (including the special sciences, such as biology, anthropology, sociology and economics, and the fundamental science, or fundamental physics) which would be synthesised into a singular epistemic entity. Key to this concept was the doctrine of theory reduction, according to which the covering law model would be used to interconnect the special sciences and, thereupon, to reduce all laws in the special sciences to fundamental physics.

The movement envisioned a universal scientific language that could express statements with common meaning intelligible to all scientific fields. Carnap sought to realise this goal through the systematic reduction of the linguistic terms of more specialised fields to those of more fundamental fields. Various methods of reduction were proposed, referring to the use of set theory to manipulate logically primitive concepts (as in Carnap's Logical Structure of the World, 1928) or via analytic and a priori deductive operations (as described in Testability and Meaning, 1936, 1937). A number of publications over a period of thirty years would attempt to elucidate this concept.

== Criticism ==
In the post-war period, key tenets of logical positivism, including the verifiability criterion, analytic-synthetic distinction and observation-theory distinction, drew escalated criticism. This would become sustained from various directions by the 1950s, so that, even among fractious philosophers who disagreed on the general objectives of epistemology, most would concur that the logical positivist program had become untenable. Notable critics included Karl Popper, W. V. O. Quine, Norwood Hanson, Thomas Kuhn, Hilary Putnam, as well as J. L. Austin, Peter Strawson, Nelson Goodman and Richard Rorty. Hempel himself became a major critic from within the movement, denouncing the positivist thesis that empirical knowledge is restricted to basic statements, observation statements or protocol statements.

=== Karl Popper ===
Karl Popper, a graduate of the University of Vienna, was an outspoken critic of the logical positivist movement from its inception. In Logik der Forschung (1934, published in English in 1959 as The Logic of Scientific Discovery) he attacked verificationism directly, contending that the problem of induction renders it impossible for scientific hypotheses and other universal statements to be verified conclusively. Any attempt to do so, he argued, would commit the fallacy of affirming the consequent, given that verification cannot—in itself—exclude alternative valid explanations for a specific phenomenon or instance of observation. He would later affirm that the content of the verifiability criterion cannot be empirically verified, thus is meaningless by its own proposition and ultimately self-defeating as a principle.

In the same book, Popper proposed falsifiability, which he presented, not as a criterion of cognitive meaning like verificationism (as commonly misunderstood), but as a criterion to distinguish scientific from non-scientific statements, thereby to demarcate the boundaries of science. Popper observed that, though universal statements cannot be verified, they can be falsified, and that the most productive scientific theories were apparently those that carried the greatest 'predictive risks' of being falsified by observation. He would conclude that the scientific method should be a hypothetico-deductive model, wherein scientific hypotheses must be falsifiable (per his criterion), held as provisionally true until proven false by observation, and are corroborated by supporting evidence rather than verified or confirmed.

In rejecting neo-positivist views of cognitive meaningfulness, Popper considered metaphysics to be rich in meaning and important in the origination of scientific theories and value systems to be integral to science's quest for truth. At the same time, he disparaged pseudoscience, referring to the confirmation biases that embolden support for unfalsifiable conjectures (notably those in psychology and psychoanalysis) and ad hoc arguments used to entrench predictive theories that have been proven conclusively false.

=== Willard V. O. Quine ===
In his influential 1951 paper "Two Dogmas of Empiricism", American philosopher and logicist Willard Van Orman Quine challenged the analytic-synthetic distinction. Specifically, Quine examined the concept of analyticity, determining that all attempts to explain the idea reduce ultimately to circular reasoning. He would conclude that, if analyticity is untenable, so too is the neo-positivist proposition to redefine its boundaries. Yet Carnap's reconstruction of analyticity was necessary for logic and mathematics to be deemed meaningful under verificationism. Quine's arguments encompassed numerous criticisms on this topic he had articulated to Carnap since 1933. His work effectively pronounced the verifiability criterion untenable, threatening to uproot the broader logical positivist project.

=== Norwood Hanson ===
In 1958, Norwood Hanson's Patterns of Discovery characterised the concept of theory-ladenness. Hanson and Thomas Kuhn held that even direct observations are never truly neutral in that they are laden with theory, i.e. influenced by a system of theoretical presuppositions that function as an interpretative framework for the senses. Accordingly, individuals subscribed to different theories might report radically different observations even as they investigate the same phenomena. Hanson's thesis attacked the observation-theory distinction, which draws a dividing line between observational and non-observational (theoretical) language. More broadly, its findings challenged the central-most tenets of empiricism in questioning the infallibility and objectivity of empirical observation.

=== Thomas Kuhn ===
Thomas Kuhn's landmark book of 1962, The Structure of Scientific Revolutions—which discussed paradigm shifts in fundamental physics—critically undermined confidence in scientific foundationalism. Kuhn proposed in its place a coherentist model of science, whereby scientific progress revolves around cores of established, coherent ideas which periodically undergo abrupt revolutionary changes.

Though foundationalism was often considered a constituent doctrine of logical positivism (and Kuhn's thesis an epistemological criticism of the movement) such views were simplistic: In the 1930s, Neurath had argued for the adoption of coherentism, famously comparing the progress of science to reconstruction of a boat at sea. Carnap had entertained foundationalism from 1929 to 1930, but he, Hans Hahn and others would later join Neurath in converting to a coherentist philosophy. The conservative wing of the Vienna Circle under Moritz Schlick subscribed to a form of foundationalism, but its principles were defined unconventionally or ambiguously.

In some sense, Kuhn's book unified science, but through historical and social assessment rather than by networking the scientific specialties using epistemological or linguistic models. His ideas were adopted quickly by scholars in non-scientific disciplines, such as the social sciences in which neo-positivists were dominant, ushering academia into postpositivism or postempiricism.

=== Hilary Putnam ===
In his critique of the received view in 1962, Hilary Putnam attacked the observation-theory distinction. Putnam proposed that the division between "observation terms" and "theoretical terms" was untenable, determining that both categories have the potential to be theory-laden. Accordingly, he remarked that observational reports frequently refer to theoretical terms in practice. He illustrated cases in which observation terms can be applied to entities that Carnap would classify as unobservables. For example, in Newton's corpuscular theory of light, observation concepts can be applied to the consideration of both sub-microscopic and macroscopic objects.

Putnam advocated scientific realism, whereby scientific theory describes a real world existing independently of the senses. He rejected positivism, which he dismissed as a form of metaphysical idealism, in that it precluded any possibility of acquiring knowledge of the unobservable aspects of nature. He also spurned instrumentalism, according to which a scientific theory is judged, not by whether it corresponds to reality, but by the extent to which it allows empirical predictions or resolves conceptual problems.

== Decline and legacy ==
In 1967, John Passmore wrote, "Logical positivism is dead, or as dead as a philosophical movement ever becomes". His opinions concurred with widespread sentiment in academic circles that the movement had run its course by the late 1960s. Logical positivism's fall heralded postpositivism, distinguished by Popper's critical rationalism—which characterised human knowledge as continuously evolving via conjectures and refutations—and Kuhn's historical and social perspectives on the saltatory course of scientific progress.

In a 1976 interview, A. J. Ayer, who had introduced logical positivism to the English-speaking world in the 1930s, was asked what he saw as its main defects and answered that, "nearly all of it was false". Yet, he maintained that it was "true in spirit", referring to the principles of empiricism and reductionism whereby mental phenomena resolve to the material or physical and philosophical questions largely resolve to ones of language and meaning. Despite its problems, logical positivism helped to anchor analytic philosophy in the English-speaking world and its influence extended beyond philosophy in shaping the course of psychology and the social sciences. In the post-war period, Carl Hempel's contributions were vitally important in establishing the subdiscipline of the philosophy of science.

Logical positivism's fall reopened the debate over the metaphysical merit of scientific theory, whether it can offer knowledge of the world beyond human experience (scientific realism) or whether it is simply an instrument to predict human experience (instrumentalism). Philosophers increasingly critiqued the movement's doctrine and history, often misrepresenting it without thorough examination, sometimes reducing it to oversimplifications and stereotypes, such as its association with foundationalism.

== See also ==
- Definitions of philosophy
- Anti-realism – Opposite position of realism
- Sociological positivism – Empiricist philosophical theory
- Academic skepticism – Skeptical period of ancient Academy
- The Structure of Science – 1961 book by Ernest Nagel
- Raven paradox – Paradox arising from the question of what constitutes evidence for a statement
- Unobservable – Entity not directly observable by humans

=== People ===
- Ernst Mach – Austrian physicist, philosopher and university educator (1838–1916)
- Gottlob Frege – German philosopher, logician, and mathematician (1848–1925)
- Friedrich Waismann – Austrian mathematician, physicist and philosopher (1896–1959)
- Gustav Bergmann – Austrian-born American philosopher (1906–1987)
- Herbert Feigl – Austrian-American philosopher
- Kurt Grelling – German logician and philosopher (1886–1942)
- R. B. Braithwaite – English philosopher and ethicist (1900–1990)
