= Special sciences =

Sciences other than fundamental physics

In the philosophy of science, the special sciences are all sciences other than fundamental physics, including, for example, chemistry, biology, and neuroscience. The distinction reflects a view that "all events which fall under the laws of any science are physical events and hence fall under the laws of physics".

In this view, all sciences except fundamental physics are special sciences. However, the legitimacy of this view, and the status of other sciences and their relation to physics, are unresolved matters. Jerry Fodor, a key writer on this subject, refers to "many philosophers" who hold this position, but in an opposing argument he has argued for strong autonomy, concluding that the special sciences are not even in principle reducible to physics. As such, Fodor has often been credited for having helped turn the tide against reductionist physicalism.

== See also ==
- Emergence – Unpredictable phenomenon in complex systems
- Emergentism – Philosophical belief in emergence
- Multiple realizability – Thesis in the philosophy of mind
- Reductionism – Philosophical view explaining systems in terms of smaller parts
- Supervenience – Relation between sets of properties or facts
- The central science – Term often associated with chemistry
- Unity of science – Theory in the philosophy of science
