= Unexplained =

Unexplained or The Unexplained may refer to:

- Unexplained (EP), a 1992 EP by EMF
- The Unexplained (magazine), a 1980s British partwork periodical
- Unexplained Channel, a 2008–2010 UK television channel
- Unexplained, a 2008 British television series presented by Tony Robinson
- The UnXplained, an American television series, beginning in 2019, hosted by William Shatner
- Unexplained (podcast), a podcast hosted by Richard MacLean Smith

== See also ==
- Medically unexplained physical symptoms
- Sudden unexplained death syndrome
- Unexplained variation/randomness/variance, in statistics, see Explained variation
  - Fraction of variance unexplained
- Fort: Prophet of the Unexplained, a 2002 comic book
- Unexplained disappearances
- Unexplained Mysteries, a 2003 documentary television series
- Unexplained Canada, a 2006 documentary television series
- The Unexplained Files, a 2010s American television series
