= Lily E. Kay =

Science historian (1947–2000)

Lily E. Kay (May 22, 1947 – December 18, 2000) was a historian of science noted for her studies of molecular biology.

== Education and early life ==
Kay was born in Kraków, Poland, the daughter of concentration camp survivors. The family relocated to Israel and then, in 1960, to the United States. Kay graduated from the University of Pittsburgh in 1969 and in 1986 earned her Ph.D. from Johns Hopkins University in the history of science.

== Teaching, research, and fellowships ==
Before earning her Ph.D., Kay taught high school physics, worked as a biochemistry research associate at the University of Pittsburgh and a senior research assistant at the Salk Institute. While there, she studied the molecular biology of viruses.

Kay spent two years as a postdoctoral fellow of the American Philosophical Society. She taught the history of science at the University of Chicago and then spent eight years at MIT. She was awarded a Guggenheim fellowship in 1997. Kay then worked as an independent scholar and held guest appointments at Harvard University and the Max Planck Institute for the History of Science. At the time of her death, Kay was studying serial computing, artificial intelligence, and models of brain function.

== Scholarship ==
In The Molecular Vision of Life (1993), Kay focused upon elite players in Pasadena, where she centered the creation of the field of molecular biology, and argued that "pure" science is influenced by pragmatism (and, in the case of molecular biology, the goals of eugenics). Norman H. Horowitz of Caltech, offended by both Kay's approach (he deemed it antireductionist, fundamentally political and antiscientific) and her characterization of scientists of his acquaintance (he lamented her failure to ask his personal opinion of these men), dismissed its historiographical value. Joshua Lederberg and Linus Pauling were among those with positive opinions of the book, which has become a classic work.

In Who Wrote the Book of Life? (1999), Kay argued that information theory influenced research in molecular biology, as well as the rhetoric surrounding the field in the 1950s and 1960s. Solomon Golomb deemed it revisionist history, unconvincing based upon his professional experience, yet well-researched and accurate. Richard Lewontin endorsed Kay's poststructuralist approach and her assertion of the ambivalent results of the deployment of metaphors.
