= Paul Oppenheim =

Paul Oppenheim (June 17, 1885 – June 22, 1977) was a German chemist, philosopher, independent scholar and industrialist.

== Biography ==
Oppenheim was born in Frankfurt am Main. After studying natural sciences and chemistry at the University of Freiburg, he earned his doctorate in chemistry and philosophy. He was active in the chemical industry (IG Farben) until 1933, when he emigrated to Brussels. His father, the Frankfurt gem dealer Nathan Moritz Oppenheim (1848–1933), and his mother took their life together in 1933. In 1939, Oppenheim and his family emigrated to the US, where he worked as a private scholar in Princeton. He and his wife Gabrielle Oppenheim-Errera hosted Sunday luncheons there for intellectuals and artists. Albert Einstein was his great friend and they took regular Sunday morning walks together.

After the beginning of Nazi rule in Germany, he gave several persecuted scientists such as Carl Gustav Hempel and Kurt Grelling financial resources and assistance to escape from Germany.

He published with Hempel and Grelling on philosophy and philosophy of science, including Gestalt psychology. Oppenheim is co-founder of the so-called Hempel–Oppenheim schema (deductive-nomological model).

== Publications ==
- Hempel, CG and Oppenheim, P.: "The type concept in light of the new logic. Theoretical studies on the constitution and psychology research.
- Kurt Grelling and Paul Oppenheim, "The Gestalt concept in light of the new logic," cognition 7 (1937/38), 211–225 [Engl. Translation: 1988.1].
- Kurt Grelling and Paul Oppenheim, Supplementary Remarks on the Concept of Gestalt, "cognition 7 (1937/38), 357–359 [Reprinted: 1988.2].
- Kurt Grelling and Paul Oppenheim, "Concerning the Structure of Wholes", Philosophy of Science 6 (1939), 487–488.
- Kurt Grelling and Paul Oppenheim, Logical Analysis of "Gestalt" as "Functional Whole" [Paper sent in for the Fifth International Congress for the Unity of Science (Cambridge, Mass., 1939)], TS, 8 p. [by Carl G . Hempel, Princeton, reprint: 1988.3, 1999.1].
- Paul Oppenheim and Nicholas Rescher, "Logical Analysis of Gestalt Concepts", British Journal for the Philosophy of Science, vol. 6 (1955), pp. 89–106.
- Paul Oppenheim and Hilary Putnam : "The Unity of Science as a Working Hypothesis". In: Minnesota Studies in the Philosophy of Science, 1958.
