= Hume's fork =

English philosophy

Hume's fork contrasted with Kant's trident/pitchfork

In epistemology, Hume's fork is a tenet elaborating upon British empiricist philosopher David Hume's emphatic division between "relations of ideas" and "matters of fact." (Alternatively, Hume's fork may refer to what is otherwise termed Hume's law, a tenet of ethics.) As phrased in Immanuel Kant's characterization of Hume's thesis, and furthered in the 1930s by the logical empiricists, Hume's fork asserts that all statements are exclusively either "analytic a priori" or "synthetic a posteriori," which, respectively, are universally true by mere definition or, however apparently probable, are unknowable without exact experience.

By Hume's fork, a statement's meaning either is analytic or is synthetic, the statement's truth—its agreement with the real world—either is necessary or is contingent, and the statement's purported knowledge either is a priori or is a posteriori. An analytic statement is true via its terms' meanings alone, hence true by definition, like Bachelors are unmarried, whereas a synthetic statement, concerning external states of affairs, may be false, like Bachelors age badly. By mere logical validity, the necessary is true in all possible worlds, whereas the contingent hinges on the world's state, a metaphysical basis. And the a priori is knowable without, whereas the a posteriori is knowable only upon, experience in the area of interest.

By Hume's fork, sheer conceptual derivations (ostensibly, logic and mathematics), being analytic, are necessary and a priori, whereas assertions of "real existence" and traits, being synthetic, are contingent and a posteriori. Hume's own, simpler, distinction concerned the problem of induction—that no amount of examination of cases will logically entail the conformity of unexamined cases—and supported Hume's aim to position humanism on par with empirical science while combatting allegedly rampant "sophistry and illusion" by philosophers and religionists. Being a transcendental idealist, Kant asserted both the hope of a true metaphysics, and a literal view of Newton's law of universal gravitation by defying Hume's fork to declare the "synthetic a priori." In the 1930s, the logical empiricists staked Hume's fork. Yet in the 1950s, W. V. O Quine undermined its analytic/synthetic distinction. And in the 1970s, Saul Kripke established the necessary a posteriori. Still, Hume's fork is a useful starting point to anchor philosophical scrutiny.

== Hume's theory and Kant's response ==
Hume's strong empiricism, as in Hume's fork as well as Hume's problem of induction, was taken as a threat to Newton's theory of motion. Immanuel Kant responded with his Transcendental Idealism in his 1781 Critique of Pure Reason, where Kant attributed to the mind a causal role in sensory experience by the mind's aligning the environmental input by arranging those sense data into the experience of space and time. Kant thus reasoned existence of the synthetic a priori—combining meanings of terms with states of facts, yet known true without experience of the particular instance—replacing the two prongs of Hume's fork with a three-pronged-fork thesis (Kant's pitchfork) and thus saving Newton's law of universal gravitation.

In 1919, Newton's theory fell to Einstein's general theory of relativity. In the late 1920s, the logical positivists rejected Kant's synthetic a priori and asserted Hume's fork, so called, while hinging it at language—the analytic/synthetic division—while presuming that by holding to analyticity, they could develop a logical syntax entailing both necessity and aprioricity via logic on one side and, on the other side, demand empirical verification, altogether restricting philosophical discourse to claims verifiable as either false or true. In the early 1950s, Willard Van Orman Quine undermined the analytic/synthetic division by explicating ontological relativity, as every term in any statement has its meaning contingent on a vast network of knowledge and belief, the speaker's conception of the entire world. By the early 1970s, Saul Kripke established the necessary a posteriori, since if the Morning Star and the Evening Star are the same star, they are the same star by necessity, but this is known true by a human only through relevant experience.

Hume's fork remains basic in Anglo-American philosophy. Many deceptions and confusions are foisted by surreptitious or unwitting conversion of a synthetic claim to an analytic claim, rendered true by necessity but merely a tautology, for instance the No true Scotsman move. Simply put, Hume's fork has limitations. Related concerns are Hume's distinction of demonstrative versus probable reasoning and Hume's law. Hume makes other, important two-category distinctions, such as beliefs versus desires and as impressions versus ideas.

== Relations of ideas and matters of fact ==
The first distinction is between two different areas of human study:

All the objects of human reason or enquiry may naturally be divided into two kinds, to wit, relations of ideas, and matters of fact. Of the first kind are the sciences of Geometry, Algebra, and Arithmetic ... [which are] discoverable by the mere operation of thought ... Matters of fact, which are the second object of human reason, are not ascertained in the same manner; nor is our evidence of their truth, however great, of a like nature with the foregoing.

— An Enquiry Concerning Human Understanding

Hume's fork is often stated in such a way that statements are divided up into two types:

- Statements about ideas. These are analytic, necessary, and knowable a priori.
- Statements about the world. These are synthetic, contingent, and knowable a posteriori.

In modern terminology, members of the first group are known as analytic propositions and members of the latter as synthetic propositions. This terminology comes from Kant (Introduction to Critique of Pure Reason, Section IV).

Into the first class fall statements such as "all bodies are extended", "all bachelors are unmarried", and ideas of mathematics and logic. Into the second class fall statements like "the sun rises in the morning", and "all bodies have mass".

Hume wants to prove that certainty does not exist in science. First, Hume notes that statements of the second type can never be entirely certain, due to the fallibility of our senses, the possibility of deception (see e.g. the modern brain in a vat theory) and other arguments made by philosophical skeptics. It is always possible that any given statement about the world is false.

Second, Hume claims that our belief in cause-and-effect relationships between events is not grounded on reason, but rather arises merely by habit or custom. Suppose one states: "Whenever someone on earth lets go of a stone it falls." While we can grant that in every instance thus far when a rock was dropped on Earth it went down, this does not make it logically necessary that in the future rocks will fall when in the same circumstances. Things of this nature rely upon the future conforming to the same principles which governed the past. But that isn't something that we can know based on past experience—all past experience could tell us is that in the past, the future has resembled the past.

Third, Hume notes that relations of ideas can be used only to prove other relations of ideas, and mean nothing outside of the context of how they relate to each other, and therefore tell us nothing about the world. Take the statement "An equilateral triangle has three sides of equal length." While some earlier philosophers (most notably Plato and Descartes) held that logical statements such as these contained the most formal reality, since they are always true and unchanging, Hume held that, while true, they contain no formal reality, because the truth of the statements rests on the definitions of the words involved, and not on actual things in the world, since there is no such thing as a true triangle or exact equality of length in the world. So for this reason, relations of ideas cannot be used to prove matters of fact.

The results claimed by Hume as consequences of his fork are drastic. According to him, relations of ideas can be proved with certainty (by using other relations of ideas), however, they don't really mean anything about the world. Since they don't mean anything about the world, relations of ideas cannot be used to prove matters of fact. Because of this, matters of fact have no certainty and therefore cannot be used to prove anything. Only certain things can be used to prove other things for certain, but only things about the world can be used to prove other things about the world. But since we can't cross the fork, nothing is both certain and about the world, only one or the other, and so it is impossible to prove something about the world with certainty.

If accepted, Hume's fork makes it pointless to try to prove the existence of God (for example) as a matter of fact. If God is not literally made up of physical matter, and does not have an observable effect on the world [although virtually all theists believe that God has an observable effect on the world since they believe it is his creation], making a statement about God is not a matter of fact. Therefore, a statement about God must be a relation of ideas. In this case if we prove the statement "God exists," it doesn't really tell us anything about the world; it is just playing with words. It is easy to see how Hume's fork voids the causal argument and the ontological argument for the existence of a non-observable God. However, this does not mean that the validity of Hume's fork would imply that God definitely does not exist, only that it would imply that the existence of God cannot be proven as a matter of fact without worldly evidence.

Hume rejected the idea of any meaningful statement that did not fall into this schema, saying:

If we take in our hand any volume; of divinity or school metaphysics, for instance; let us ask, Does it contain any abstract reasoning concerning quantity or number? No. Does it contain any experimental reasoning concerning matter of fact and existence? No. Commit it then to the flames: for it can contain nothing but sophistry and illusion. — An Enquiry Concerning Human Understanding
