= Hypothetico-deductive model =

Proposed description of the scientific method

The hypothetico-deductive model or method is a proposed description of the scientific method. According to it, scientific inquiry proceeds by formulating a hypothesis in a form that can be falsifiable, using a test on observable data where the outcome is not yet known. A test outcome that could have and does run contrary to predictions of the hypothesis is taken as a falsification of the hypothesis. A test outcome that could have, but does not run contrary to the hypothesis corroborates the theory. It is then proposed to compare the explanatory value of competing hypotheses by testing how stringently they are corroborated by their predictions.

== Example ==
One example of an algorithmic statement of the hypothetico-deductive method is as follows:

1. Use your experience: Consider the problem and try to make sense of it. Gather data and look for previous explanations. If this is a new problem to you, then move to step 2.
2. Form a conjecture (hypothesis): When nothing else is yet known, try to state an explanation, to someone else, or to your notebook.
3. Deduce predictions from the hypothesis: if you assume 2 is true, what consequences follow?
4. Test (or experiment): Look for evidence (observations) that conflict with these predictions in order to disprove 2. It is a fallacy or error in one's reasoning to seek 3 directly as proof of 2. This formal fallacy is called affirming the consequent.

One possible sequence in this model would be 1, 2, 3, 4. If the outcome of 4 holds, and 3 is not yet disproven, you may continue with 3, 4, 1, and so forth; but if the outcome of 4 shows 3 to be false, you will have to go back to 2 and try to invent a new 2, deduce a new 3, look for 4, and so forth.

Note that this method can never absolutely verify (prove the truth of) 2. It can only falsify 2. (This is what Einstein meant when he said, "No amount of experimentation can ever prove me right; a single experiment can prove me wrong.")

== Discussion ==
Additionally, as pointed out by Carl Hempel (1905–1997), this simple view of the scientific method is incomplete; a conjecture can also incorporate probabilities, e.g., the drug is effective about 70% of the time. Tests, in this case, must be repeated to substantiate the conjecture (in particular, the probabilities). In this and other cases, we can quantify a probability for our confidence in the conjecture itself and then apply a Bayesian analysis, with each experimental result shifting the probability either up or down. Bayes' theorem shows that the probability will never reach exactly 0 or 100% (no absolute certainty in either direction), but it can still get very close to either extreme. See also confirmation holism.

Qualification of corroborating evidence is sometimes raised as philosophically problematic. The raven paradox is a famous example. The hypothesis that 'all ravens are black' would appear to be corroborated by observations of only black ravens. However, 'all ravens are black' is logically equivalent to 'all non-black things are non-ravens' (this is the contrapositive form of the original implication). 'This is a green tree' is an observation of a non-black thing that is a non-raven and therefore corroborates 'all non-black things are non-ravens'. It appears to follow that the observation 'this is a green tree' is corroborating evidence for the hypothesis 'all ravens are black'.

Attempted resolutions may distinguish:

- non-falsifying observations as to strong, moderate, or weak corroborations
- investigations that do or do not provide a potentially falsifying test of the hypothesis.

Evidence contrary to a hypothesis is itself philosophically problematic. Such evidence is called a falsification of the hypothesis. However, under the theory of confirmation holism it is always possible to save a given hypothesis from falsification. This is so because any falsifying observation is embedded in a theoretical background, which can be modified in order to save the hypothesis. Karl Popper acknowledged this but maintained that a critical approach respecting methodological rules that avoided such immunizing stratagems is conducive to the progress of science.

Physicist Sean Carroll claims the model ignores underdetermination.

=== Versus other research models ===
The hypothetico-deductive approach contrasts with other research models such as the inductive approach or grounded theory. In the data percolation methodology, the hypothetico-deductive approach is included in a paradigm of pragmatism by which four types of relations between the variables can exist: descriptive, of influence, longitudinal or causal. The variables are classified in two groups, structural and functional, a classification that drives the formulation of hypotheses and the statistical tests to be performed on the data so as to increase the efficiency of the research.

== See also ==
- Confirmation bias
- Deductive-nomological
- Explanandum and explanans
- Inquiry
- Models of scientific inquiry
- Philosophy of science
- Pragmatism
- Scientific method
- Verifiability theory of meaning
- Will to believe doctrine

=== Types of inference ===
- Strong inference
- Abductive reasoning
- Deductive reasoning
- Inductive reasoning
- Analogy
