= Timeline of the history of the scientific method =

This timeline of the history of the scientific method shows an overview of the development of the scientific method up to the present time. For a detailed account, see History of the scientific method.

== BC ==
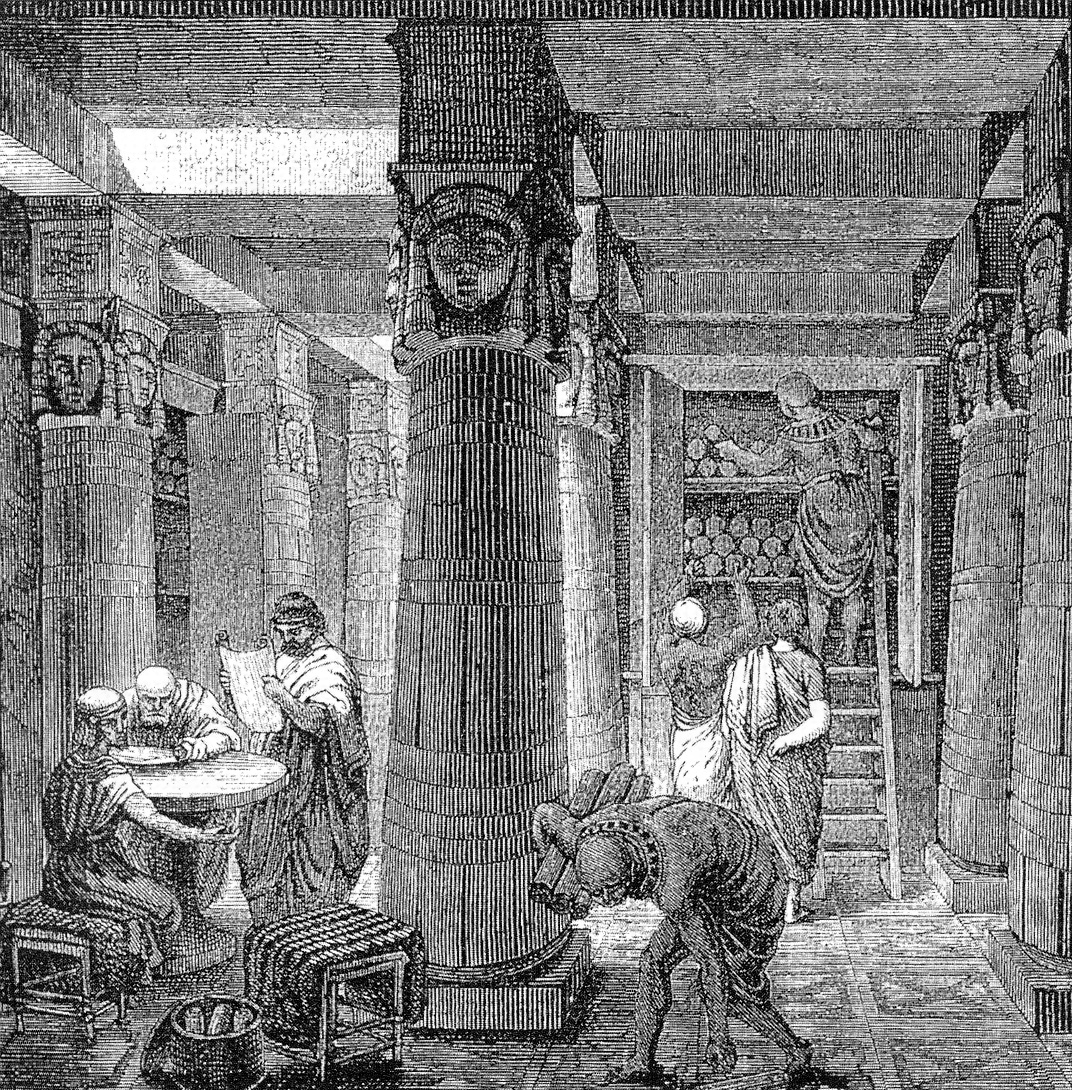
Nineteenth-century illustration of the ancient Great Library at Alexandria

- c.1600 BC – The Edwin Smith Papyrus, a unique ancient Egyptian text, contains practical and objective advice to physicians regarding the examination, diagnosis, treatment and prognosis, of injuries and ailments. It provides evidence that medicine in Egypt was at this time practiced as a quantifiable science.
- c. 600 – 700 BC – The earliest form of Charvaka practiced by philosopher Ajita Kesakambali.
- c. 600 – 200 BC – The Vaisheshika school of Hindu philosophy, founded by the ancient Indian philosopher Kanada, accepted perception and inference as the only two reliable sources of knowledge.
- c. 624 – 548 BC – Thales of Miletus raises the study of nature from the realm of the mythical to the level of empirical study.
- c. 610 – 547 BC – The Greek philosopher Anaximander extends the idea of law from human society to the physical world, and is the first to use maps and models.
- c.400 BC – In China, the philosopher Mozi founds the Mohist school of philosophy and introduces the 'three-prong method' for testing the truth or falsehood of statements.
- c.400 BC – The Greek philosopher Democritus advocates inductive reasoning through a process of examining the causes of perceptions and drawing conclusions about the outside world.
- c.400 BC – Plato provides the first detailed definitions of the concepts of idea, matter, form and appearance.
- c.320 BC – Aristotle categorizes and subdivides knowledge into physics, poetry, zoology, logic, rhetoric, politics, and biology. His Posterior Analytics defended the ideal of science as originating from known axioms. Aristotle believed that the world was real and that we can learn the truth by experience.
- c.341-270 BC – Epicurus and his followers develop an epistemology as a result of their rivalry with other philosophical schools. His treatise Κανών ('Rule'), now lost, explained his methods of investigation and theory of knowledge.
- c.300 BC – Euclid's Euclid's Elements expounds geometry as a system of theorems following logically from axioms.
- c.240 BC – The Greek polymath Eratosthenes calculates the circumference of the Earth to a remarkable degree of accuracy, using stadia, then a standard unit for measuring distances.
- c.200 BC – The Great Library of Alexandria is built as part of a larger research institution called the Mouseion, with the intention that it becomes a collection of all Greek knowledge.
- c.150 BC – The first chapter of the Book of Daniel describes an early (and flawed) version of a clinical trial proposed by the young Jewish noble Daniel, in which he and his three companions eat vegetables and water for ten days, rather than the royal food and wine.

== 1st–12th centuries ==
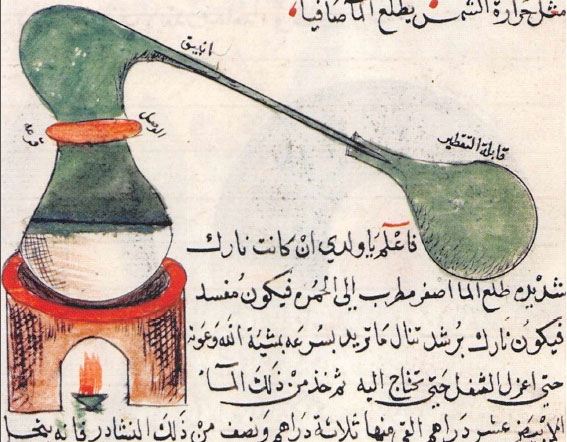
Drawing and description of an alembic

- c.90–168 – Ptolemy writes the astronomical treatise now known as the Almagest. His writings reveal his understanding of the scientific method, his recognition of the importance of both systematically ordered observations and hypotheses.
- c.480–540 – Indian Buddhist philosopher Dignāga of the Nyaya school writes the Pramāṇa-samuccaya stating that there are only two valid cognitions (pramāṇa); perception (pratyakṣa), and inference (anumāna).
- c. 500–600 – Indian Philosopher Dharmakīrti in the Pramāṇavārttika states that perception is a non-conceptual knowing of particulars that is bound by causality, while inference is reasonable, linguistic, and conceptual.
- c. 800–900 – Early Muslim scientists such al-Kindi (801–873) and the authors writing under the name of Jabir ibn Hayyan (died c. 806–816) started to put a greater emphasis on the use of experiment as a source of knowledge.
- 1021 – The astronomer, physicist and mathematician Ibn al-Haytham combines observations, experiments and rational arguments in his Book of Optics.
- c. 1025 – The scholar al-Biruni develops experimental methods for mineralogy and mechanics, and conducts elaborate experiments related to astronomical phenomena.
- 1027 – In his treatise al-Burhân ('On Demonstration') in his book Kitāb al-Šifāʾ ('The Book of Healing'), the Persian polymath Ibn Sīnā (known in the Western world as Avicenna) censures Aristotelian method of induction.

== 1200–1700 ==
- 1220–1235 – Robert Grosseteste, an English scholastic philosopher, theologian and later the Bishop of Lincoln during 1253, publishes his Aristotelian commentaries, laying out the framework for the proper methods of science.
- 1265 – The English monk Roger Bacon, inspired by the writings of Robert Grosseteste, describes a scientific method based on a repeating cycle of observation, hypothesis, experimentation, and the need for independent verification. He recorded the manner in which he conducted his experiments in precise detail so that others could reproduce and independently test his results.
- 1327 – Ockham's razor appears, a principle which states that among competing hypotheses, the one with the fewest assumptions should be selected.
- 1408 – The Yongle Encyclopedia (Chinese: 永樂大典), the largest encyclopedia in book form ever made, is completed.
- 1558 - Magia Naturalis, a work of popular science by Giambattista della Porta, is published. In the preface, the author wrote: "In our method I shall observe what our ancestors have said; then I shall show by my own experience, whether they be true or false... Many men have written what they never saw..."
- 1581 – The sceptic Francisco Sanches uses classical sceptical arguments to show that science, in the Aristotelian sense of giving necessary reasons or causes for the behavior of nature, cannot be attained.
- 1581 – The Danish astronomer Tycho Brahe builds Uraniborg and Stjärneborg on the island of Ven. Research done in the fields of astronomy, alchemy, and meteorology by Tycho and his assistants produces high precision measurements of the planets.
- 1595 – The microscope is invented in the Netherlands.
- 1608 – Evidence of the earliest known telescope appears in the Netherlands, when a patent is submitted by Hans Lipperhey.
- 1609 – The first 'public chemical laboratory' is set up at the University of Marburg.
- 1620 – The Novum Organum, fully Novum Organum, sive indicia vera de Interpretatione Naturae ("New Organon, or true directions concerning the interpretation of nature"), a philosophical work by English philosopher and statesman Francis Bacon, is published.
- 1637 – The French philosopher, mathematician and scientist René Descartes publishes his Discourse on the Method of Rightly Conducting One's Reason and of Seeking Truth in the Sciences, an important work in the development of the natural sciences.
- 1638 – Galileo's Discorsi e dimostrazioni matematiche intorno a due nuove scienze (commonly known as Two New Sciences), his scientific testament covering much of his work in physics over the preceding thirty years, is published. It contains two thought experiments, now referred to as his Leaning Tower of Pisa experiment and Galileo's ship, each invented to disprove a physical theory by showing that it has a contradictory consequence.

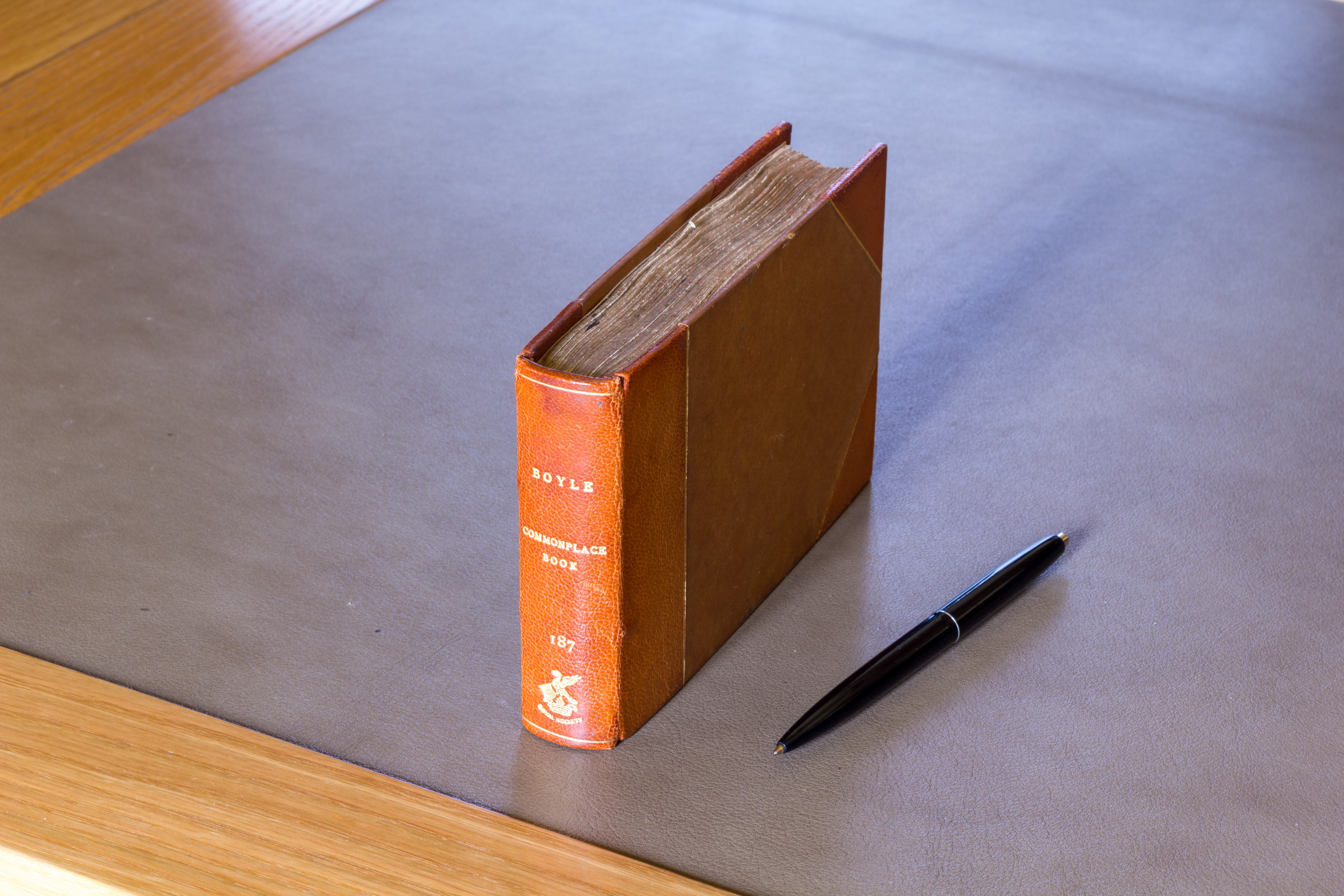
Robert Boyle's notebook for 1690-1. Boyle was a founding Fellow of the Royal Society.

- 1650 – The world's oldest national scientific institution, the Royal Society, is founded in London. It establishes experimental evidence as the arbiter of truth.
- c.1665 – The British scientist Robert Boyle reveals his scientific methods in his writings, and commends that a subject be generally researched before detailed experiments are undertaken; that results that are inconsistent with current theories are reported; that experiments should be regarded as 'provisional' in nature; and that experiments are shown to be repeatable.
- 1665 – Academic journals are published for the first time, in France and Great Britain.
- 1675 – To encourage the publicising of new discoveries in science, the German-born Henry Oldenburg pioneers the practice now known as peer reviewing, by sending scientific manuscripts to experts to judge their quality.
- 1687 – Sir Isaac Newton's book Philosophiæ Naturalis Principia Mathematica (Mathematical Principles of Natural Philosophy), is first published. It laid the foundations of classical mechanics. Newton also made seminal contributions to optics, and shares credit with Gottfried Wilhelm Leibniz for developing the infinitesimal calculus.

== 1700–1900 ==
A schematic diagram of Maxwell's demon (1867), a thought experiment involving an imaginary process sorting out particles according to their speed

- 1739 – David Hume's Treatise of Human Nature argues that the problem of induction is unsolvable.
- 1753 – The first description of a controlled experiment using identical populations with only one variable is published, when James Lind, a Scottish doctor, undergoes research into scurvy among sailors.
- 1763 – Reverend Thomas Bayes' An Essay Towards Solving a Problem in the Doctrine of Chances is published posthumously. The Essay laid the basis for Bayesian inference, used to update the probability estimate for a hypothesis as additional evidence is acquired.
- 1812 – Hans Christian Ørsted formulates the Latin-German mixed term Gedankenexperiment, meaning 'thought experiment', a method used since antiquity.
- 1815 – An optimal design for polynomial regression is published by the French logician Joseph Diaz Gergonne.
- 1833, 1840 – William Whewell invents the term scientist, previously 'natural philosopher' or 'man of science'. In his Philosophy of the Inductive Sciences he coins the term "consilience" the principle that evidence from independent, unrelated sources can 'converge' to strong conclusions.
- 1877–1878 – The American scientist Charles Sanders Peirce writes his Illustrations of the Logic of Science. The work popularises his trichotomy of abduction, deduction and induction.
- 1885 – Peirce and Joseph Jastrow first describe blinded, randomized experiments.
- 1897 – The American geologist Thomas Chrowder Chamberlin proposes the use of multiple hypotheses to assist in the design of experiments.

== 1900–present ==
A computer simulation of the movement of a landslide in San Mateo County, California

- 1905 – The German-born theoretical physicist Albert Einstein proposes the theory of special relativity.
- 1926 – Randomized design is popularized and analyzed by the British statistician Ronald Fisher.
- 1934 – Falsifiability as a criterion for evaluating new hypotheses is popularized by Karl Popper's The Logic of Scientific Discovery .
- 1937 – The first complete placebo trial is undertaken. The American pharmacologist Harry Gold, studying the effect of xanthines on cardiac pain, alternates them with a placebo and shows them to be ineffective.
- 1946 – Work begins on the first computer simulation in history, a digital flight simulator developed by the Massachusetts Institute of Technology, for training bomber crews.
- 1950 – Research based on the double blind test is published for the first time, by Greiner et al.
- 1962 – The American physicist Thomas S. Kuhn publishes his book The Structure of Scientific Revolutions, which controversially challenged powerful and entrenched philosophical assumptions about the progress of science through history.
- 1964 – Strong inference—a model of scientific inquiry that emphasizes the need for alternative hypotheses—is proposed by the American physicist John R. Platt.
- 1976 – The British-born, professor emeritus of statistics at the University of Wisconsin–Madison George E. P. Box publishes his Journal Article Science and Statistics, which sets a framework for statistical modeling of phenomena, and the need for only appropriate complexity in model.
- 2009 – Robot Scientist (also known as Adam) is created, the first machine in history to have discovered new scientific knowledge independently of its human creators.
- 2012 – Constructor theory, a proposal for a new mode of explanation in fundamental physics, is sketched out by the British physicist David Deutsch.

== Sources ==
- Allen, James P. (2005). The Art of Medicine in Ancient Egypt. New York: Metropolitan Museum of Art. ISBN 1-58839-170-1.
- Asmis, Elizabeth (1984), Epicurus' Scientific Method, Ithaca, New York: Cornell University Press, ISBN 978-08014-1465-7(registration required)
- Burgin, Mark (2017). Theory of Knowledge: Structures And Processes. New Jersey: World Scientific Publishing Co. Pte. Ltd. ISBN 97898-145226-70.
- Clegg, Brian (2013). Roger Bacon: The First Scientist. New York: Carroll & Graf Publishers. ISBN 9781472112125.(registration required)
- Committee on the Conduct of Science (1995). On being a scientist: responsible conduct in research. Washington, D.C.: National Academy Press. ISBN 9780309051965.(registration required)
- König, Jason; Oikonomopoulou, Katerina; Woolf, Greg, eds. (2013). Ancient Libraries. Cambridge, New York: Cambridge University Press. ISBN 978-1-107-01256-1.
- Magill, Frank N. (16 December 2003). The Ancient World: Dictionary of World Biography. Routledge. ISBN 9781135457396.
- Shapiro, Arthur K.; Shapiro, Elaine (1997). The Powerful Placebo: From Ancient Priest to Modern Physician. Baltimore and London: The Johns Hopkins University Press. ISBN 0-8018-6675-8.
- Van Helden, Albert; Dupre, Sven; van Gent, Rob; Zuidervaart, Huib, eds. (2010). The Origins of the Telescope. Amsterdam: KNAW Press. ISBN 978-90-6984-615-6.
