= Hans van Steenwinckel the Elder =

Flemish-Danish architect, sculptor (c. 1550–1601)

Hans van Steenwinckel
- Born: 1550; Antwerpen
- Died: May 1601 (aged 50–51); Halmstad

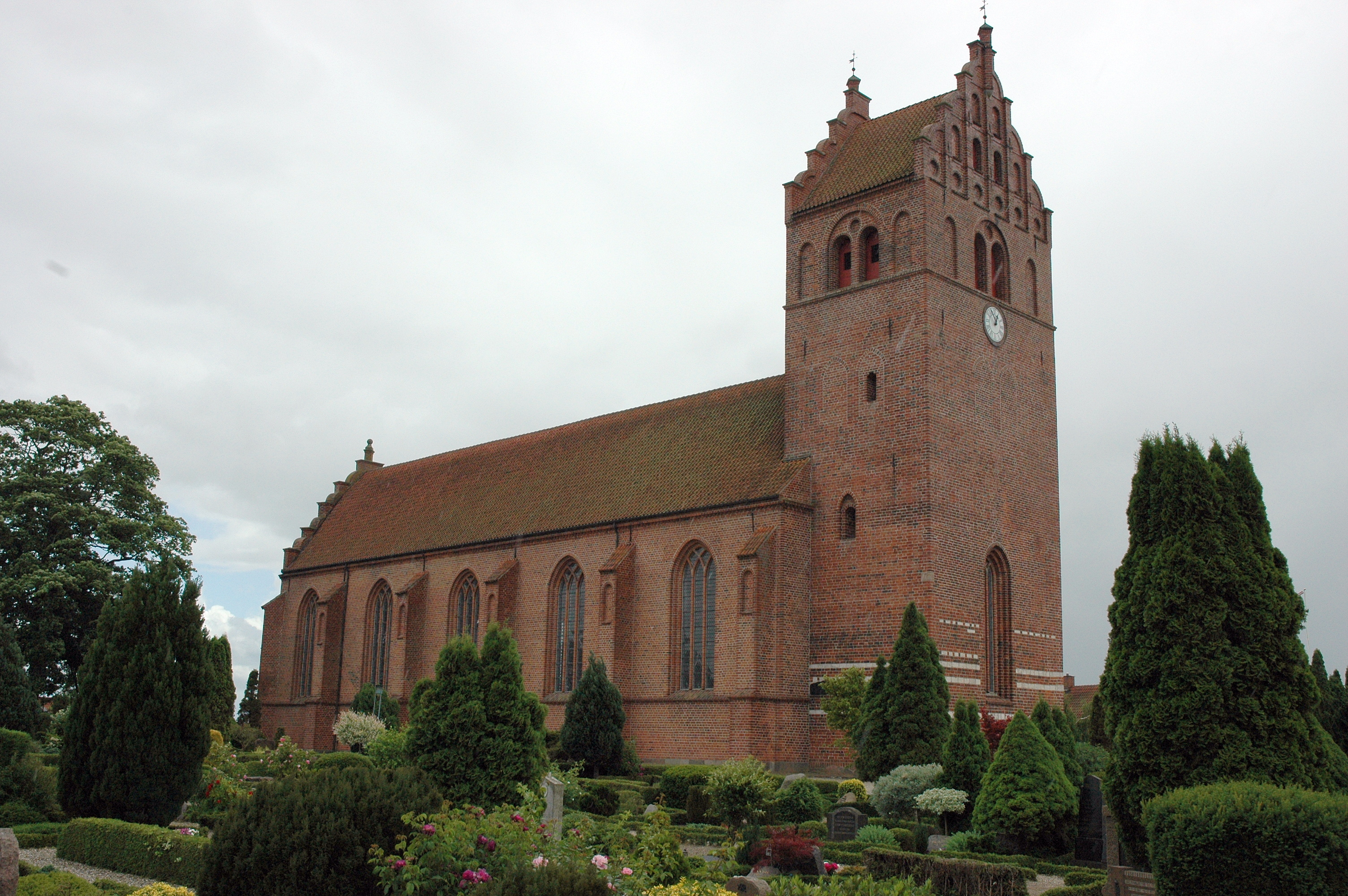
Slangerup Church, completed in 1588

Hans van Steenwinckel the Elder (c. 1550 – 10 May 1601) was a Flemish-Danish architect and sculptor. He worked on a large number of the most important Danish buildings of his time, although the exact scope of his contributions in many cases remains uncertain and much have been demolished or redesigned later. The father of Hans van Steenwinckel the Younger and Lorenz van Steenwinckel, he also founded a dynasty of architects and sculptors in Denmark.

== Biography ==
Hans van Steenwinckel was born in Antwerp c. 1550. The family fled to Emden, East Frisia, where his father, Lourens van Steenwinckel, became master builder. later city architect, and designed the Town Hall from 1567 onwards, later destroyed during World War II. Hans van Steenwinckel trained under his father, and it is known that he received payment for a design for the Town Hall's stairs and tower in 1574.

In 1578 he travelled to Denmark, most likely as one of the master bricklayers which his countryman Anthonis van Obbergen invited to Denmark to assist him building Frederick II's Kronborg Castle at Elsinore. Hans only worked on Kronborg for around a year before he, with royal permission, went on the island of Hven to work for the distinguished astronomer Tycho Brahe, who had for life been granted the island by the King as well as funds for the construction of a house and observatory on the premises. Hans van Steenwinckel probably worked both on Uraniborg and the subsequent Stjerneborg observatory, both of which were demolished after Brahe's death in 1601. From 1585 he lived and worked in Copenhagen but his presence on Hven is documented several times in the 1580s and last in 1590. He studied theoretical renaissance architecture and Brahe taught him both astronomy and geometry.

In 1582 he had been named Royal Building Master and in the 1580s he designed Slangerup Church. He also worked on a number of churches in Copenhagen, including St. Peter's Church and possibly also the towers at the Churches of Saint Nicolai and the Church of the Holy Ghost although this remains uncertain.

Hans van Steenwinckel also built and rebuilt a number of manor houses around the country, including Berritzgaard, Näsbyholm and Orebygård.

In 1588 the new King Christian IV appointed him Government Architect and from this date his main task was to modernize the fortifications in many Danish towns and strongholds in Sweden and Norway. These included Bohus Fortress, Varberg, Halmstad and Akershus. He was also responsible for the layout of the completely new town of Christianopel. According to his gravestone he was himself most proud of the fortifications of Halmstad, where he died in 1601 and is buried at St. Nicolai's Church.

== Projects ==
- Uranienborg (1576–80)
- Stjerneborg (1584)
- Näsbyholm
- Berritzgaard (1586)
- Orebygaard (1578–1587)
- Lundehave (1587)
- Slangerup Church (1588)
- Fortifications including Bohus Fortress, Halmstad, Varberg, Akershus (1588-)
- Christianopel (1599)

== See also ==
- Hans van Steenwinckel
