= Johan Gregor van der Schardt =

Italian sculptor

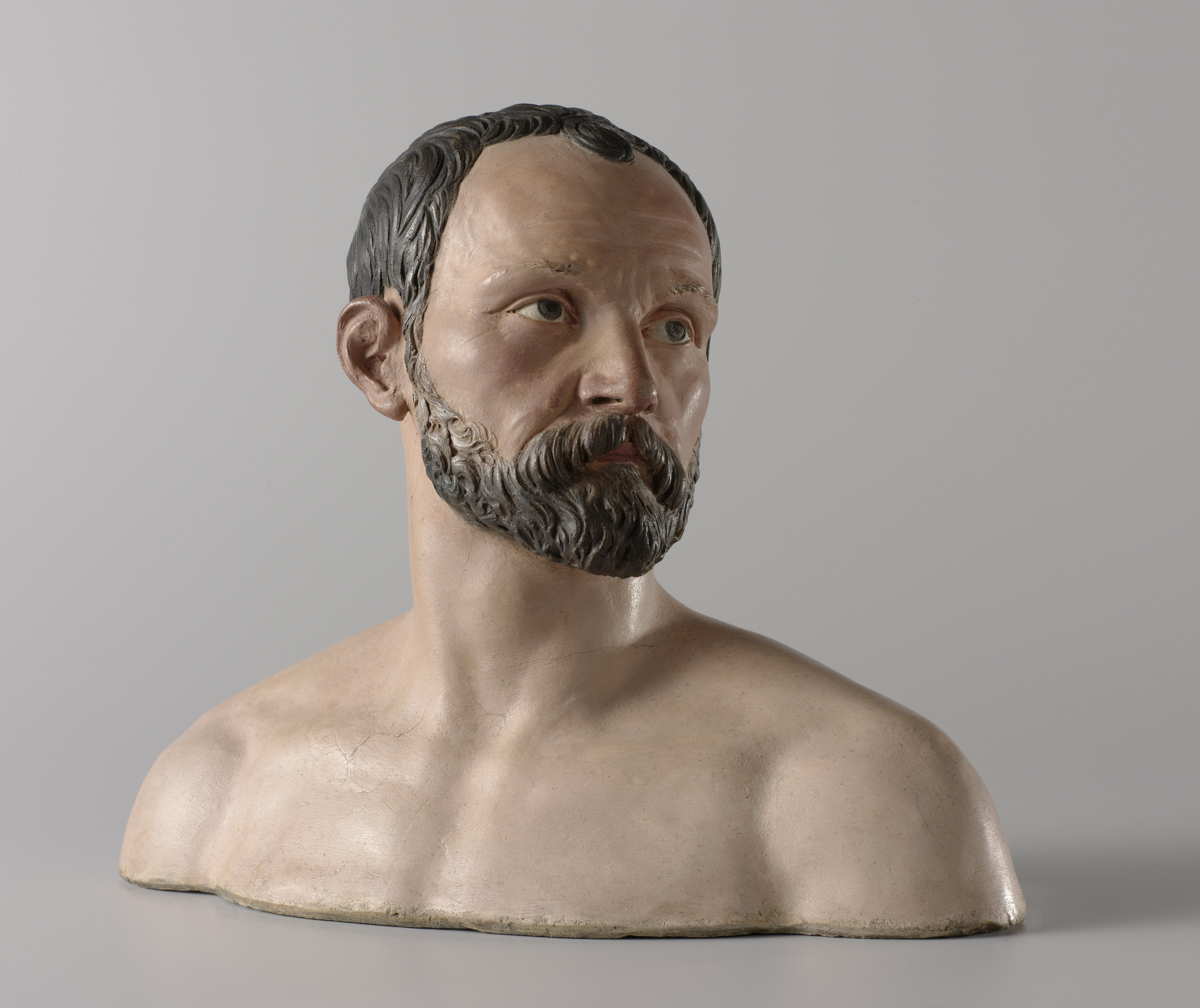
self-portrait, bust, c. 1573

Johan (or Jan) Gregor van der Schardt (c. 1530/31 in Nijmegen, Netherlands – after 1581 in Denmark) was a sculptor from the Northern Renaissance.

== Life ==
He toured Italy in the 1560s and among others worked in Bologna. From 1569 to 1576 he was in the service of Maximilian II, Holy Roman Emperor in Vienna, and subsequently took commissions in Nuremberg, where he specialised in painted terracotta busts. Such a bust includes a self-portrait of about 1573, one of the earliest such examples by a sculptor.

From c. 1576 to c. 1580, he worked on the construction of the Uraniborg observatory of the Danish astronomer Tycho Brahe on the island of Hven.

After 1576 he moved to the royal court of Denmark (with a return to Nuremberg in 1579) where he is presumed to have worked during the 1580s and died in the early 1590s, perhaps at Uraniborg on 30 November 1591.

Unusually for a non-Italian artist, his work was praised by Giorgio Vasari.

== Gallery ==
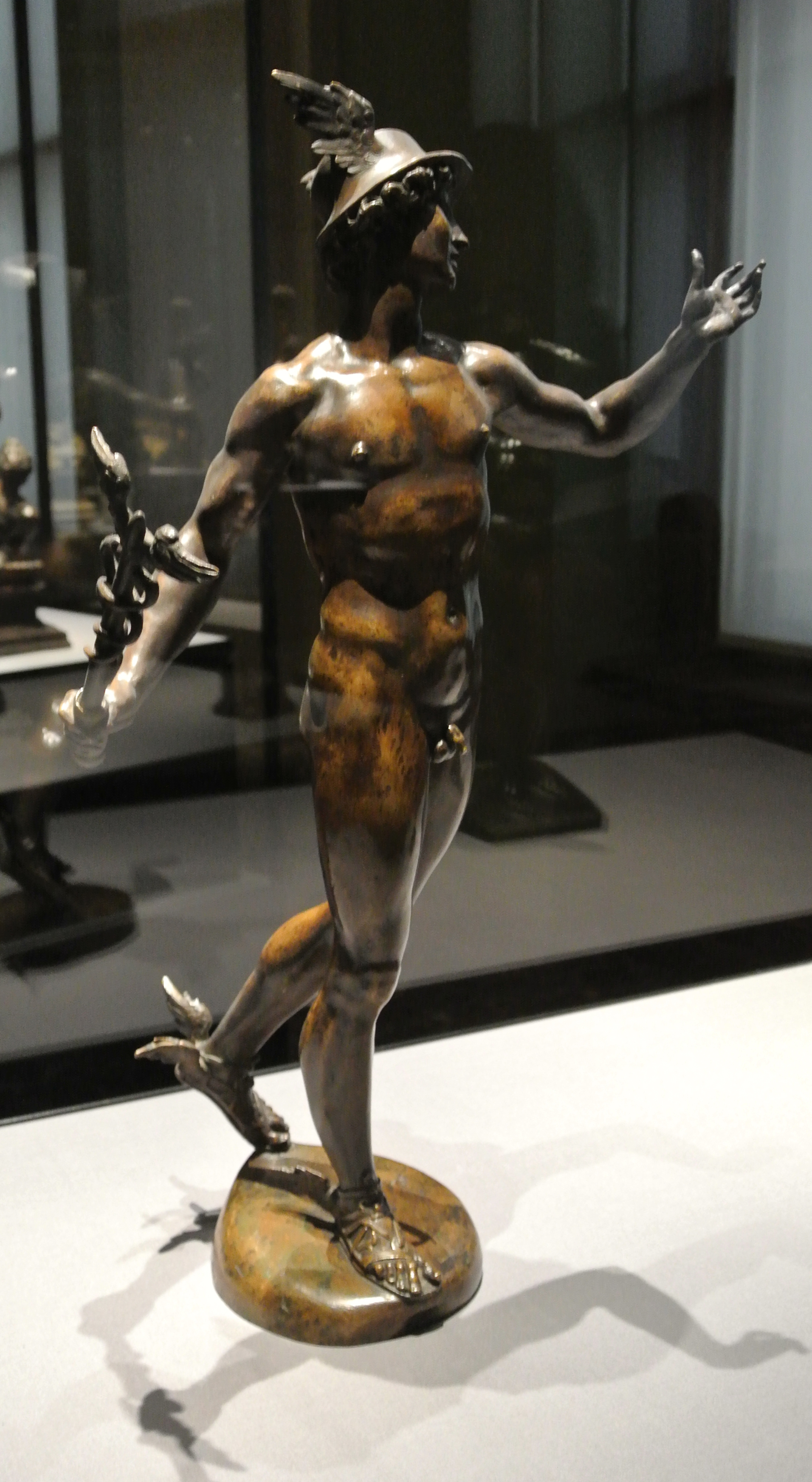
Mercurius, ca. 1570/76, Kunsthistorisches Museum

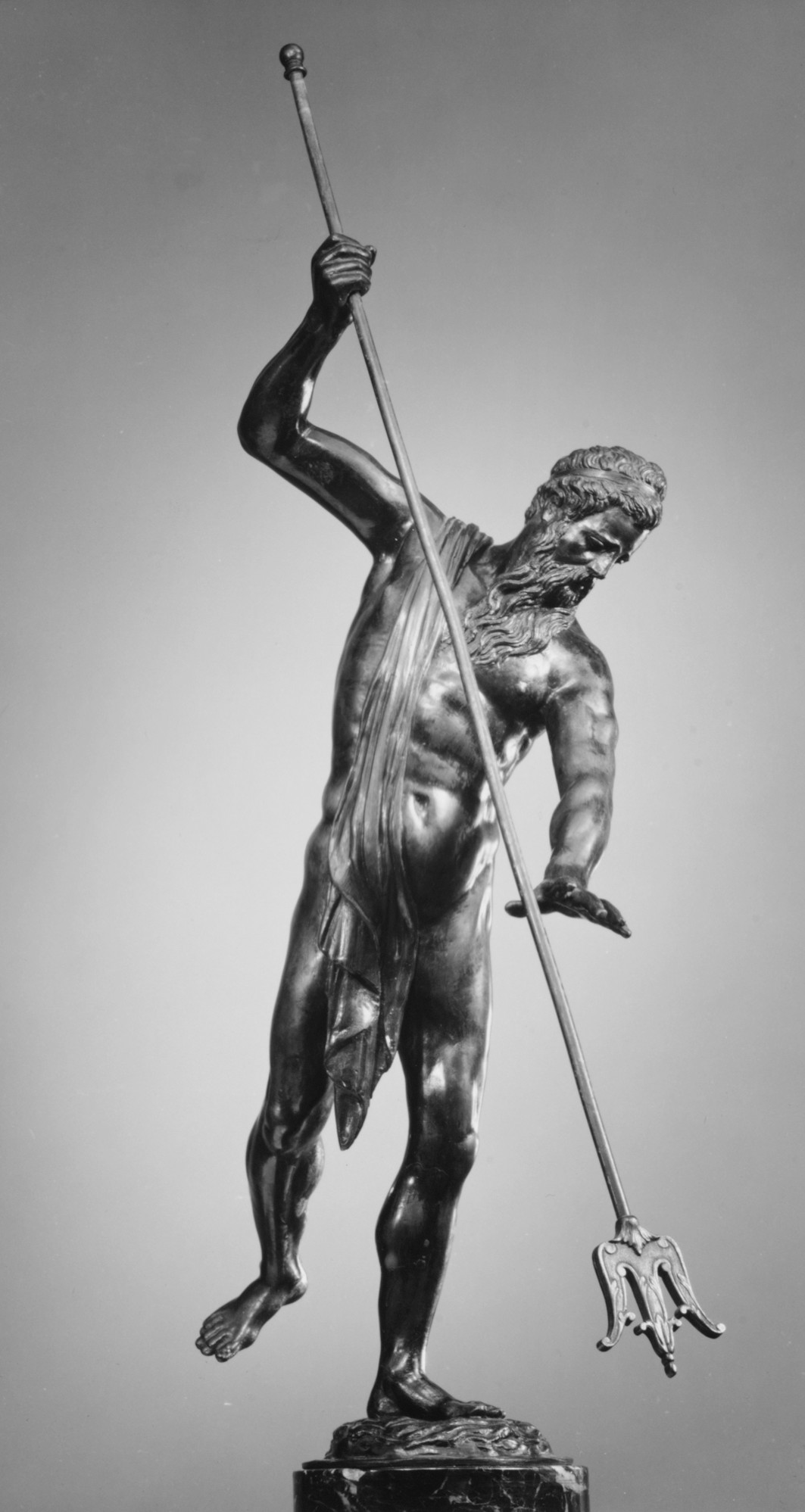
Neptune, Metropolitan Museum of Art

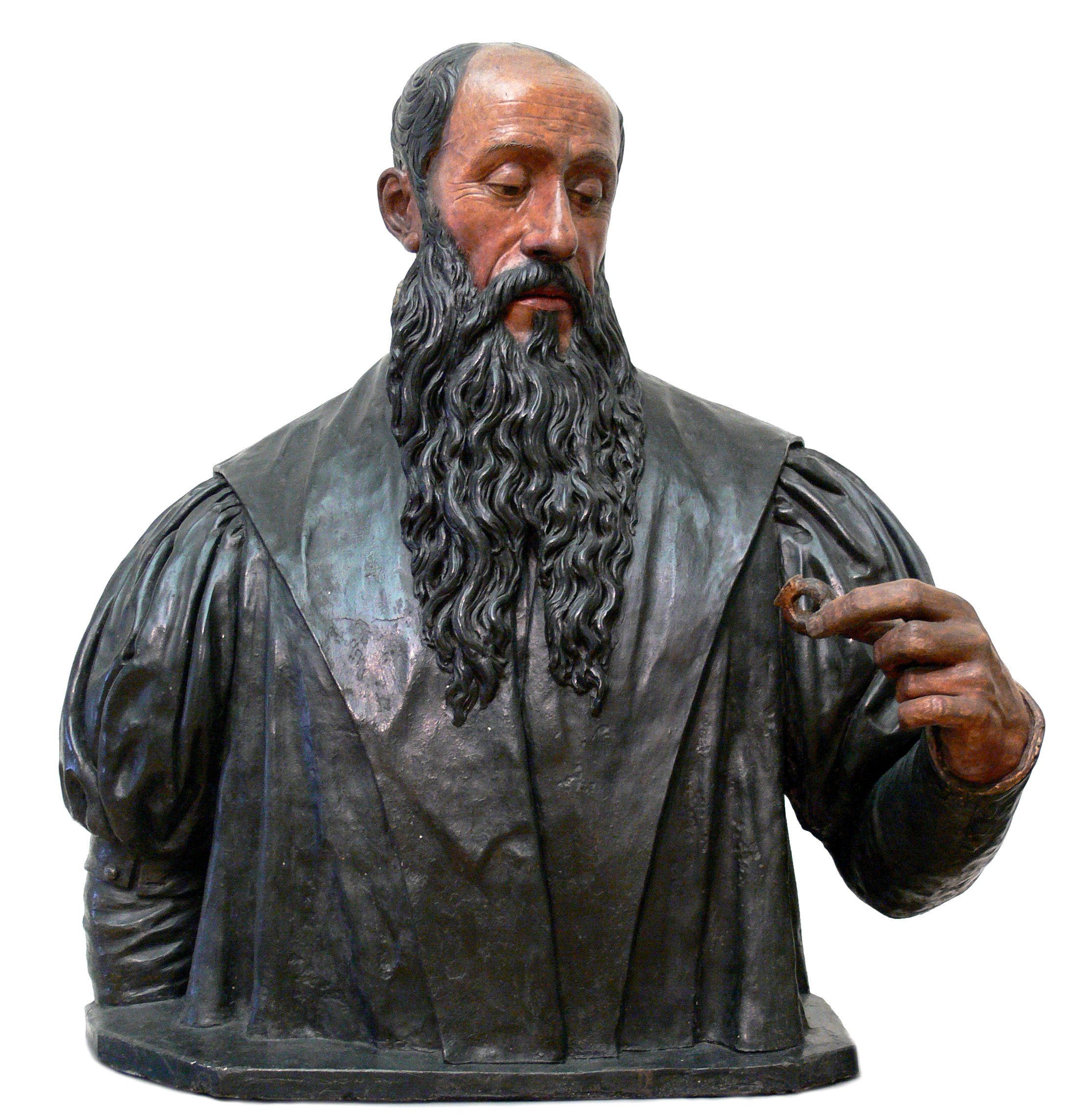
Portretbuste Willibald Imhoff the Elder, ca. 1570 - ca. 1590

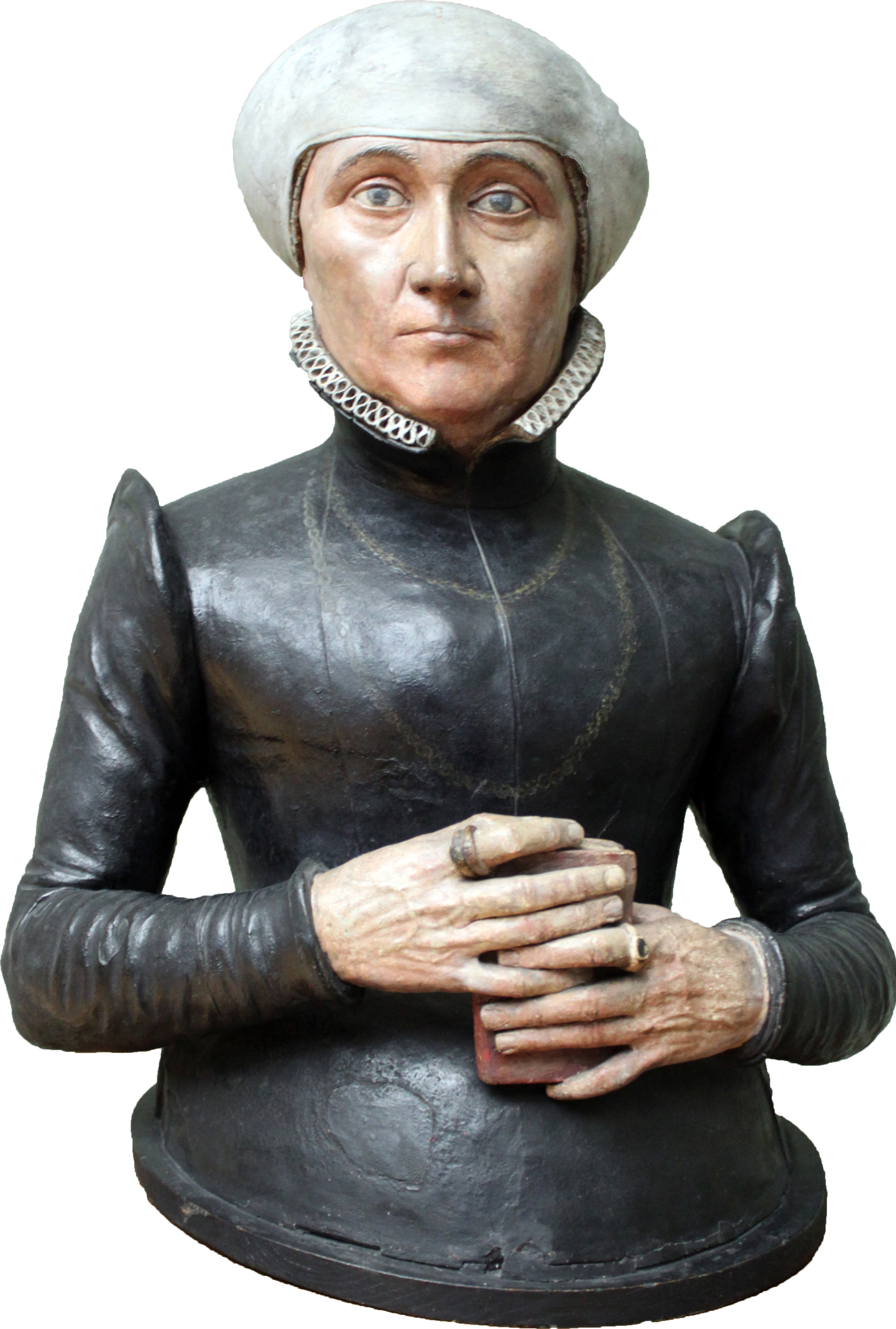
Portrait buste Anna Imhoff, ca. 1580, Bodemuseum

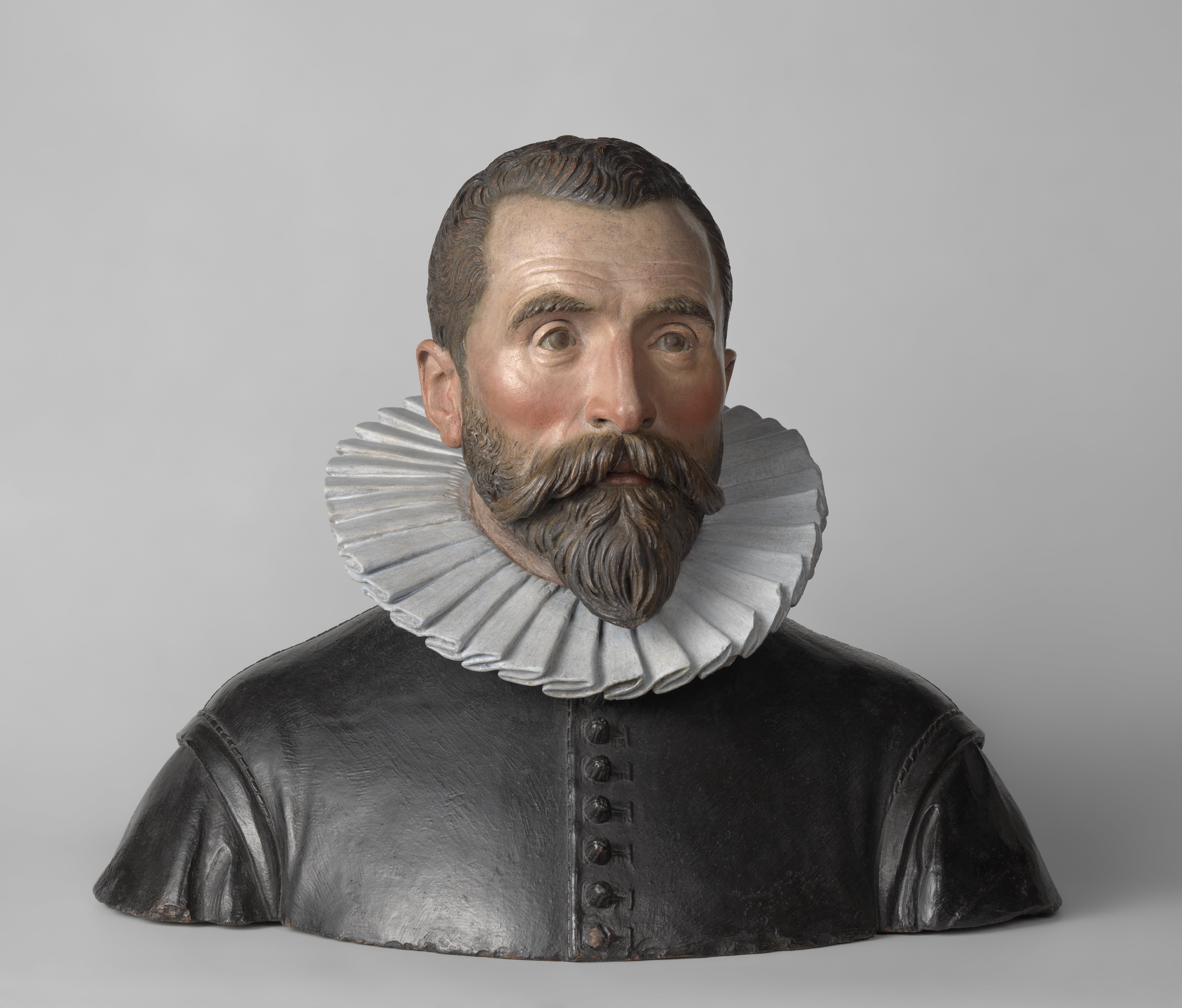
Portrait buste Johann Neudörfer the younger
