= Slangerup Church =

- St Michael's Church
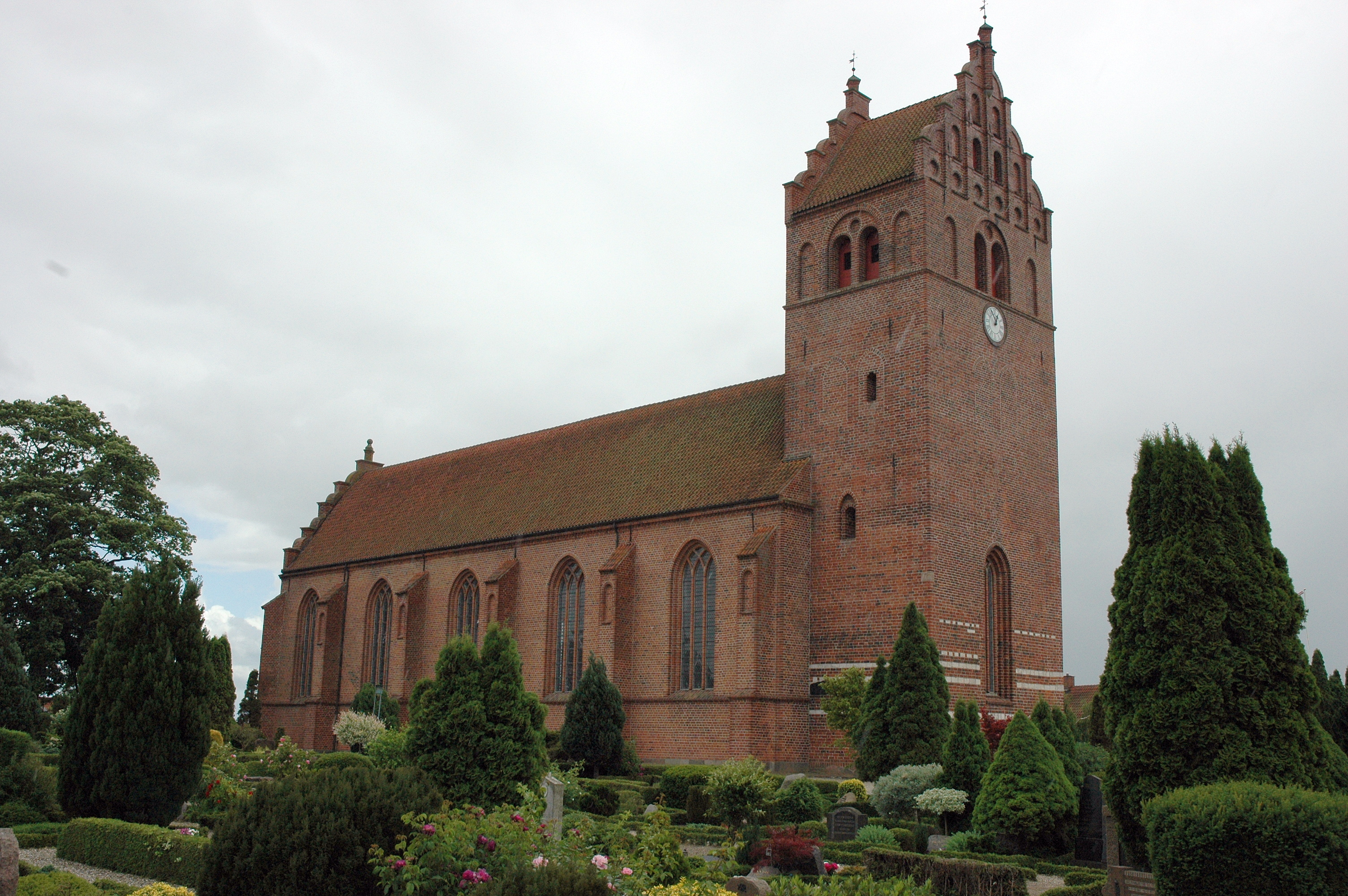
- Slangerup Kirke in 2008
- Slangerup Church
- 55.845661°N 12.170785°E
- Location: Strandstræde 2, 3550 Slangerup
- Country: Denmark
- Denomination: Church of Denmark
- Website: www.slangerupkirke.dk

History
- Status: Church
- Dedication: Michael

Architecture
- Architect: Hans van Steenwinckel the Elder
- Architectural type: Gothic, Renaissance
- Completed: 1588
- Construction cost: 1000 rix-dollars

Specifications
- Materials: Travertine

Administration
- Diocese: Helsingør
- Deanery: Frederikssund
- Parish: Slangerup

Slangerup Church (Danish: Slangerup Kirke) or St Michael's Church (Danish: Skt. Michaels Kirke) is an Evangelical Lutheran church located in the centre of Slangerup, Frederikssund Municipality, Denmark.

== History and description ==
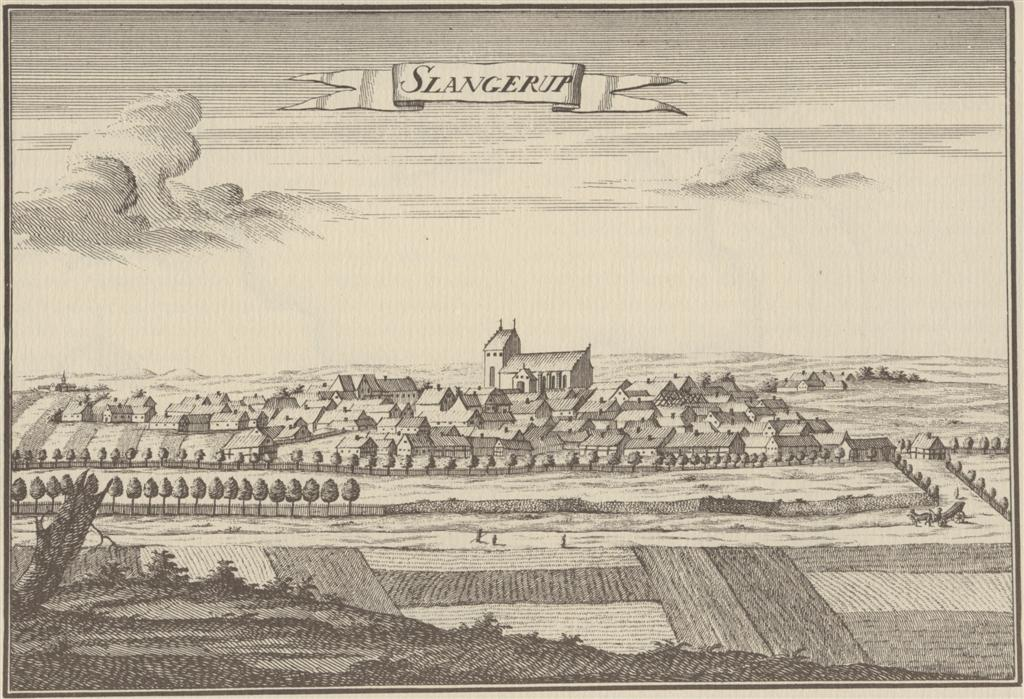
Prospect of Slangerup, date unknown

Slangerup Church in its current form was completed in 1588 by architect Hans van Steenwinckel the Elder and master builder Jørgen van Friborg. Another church is mentioned on the site, presumed reused for the building of Slangerup Church.

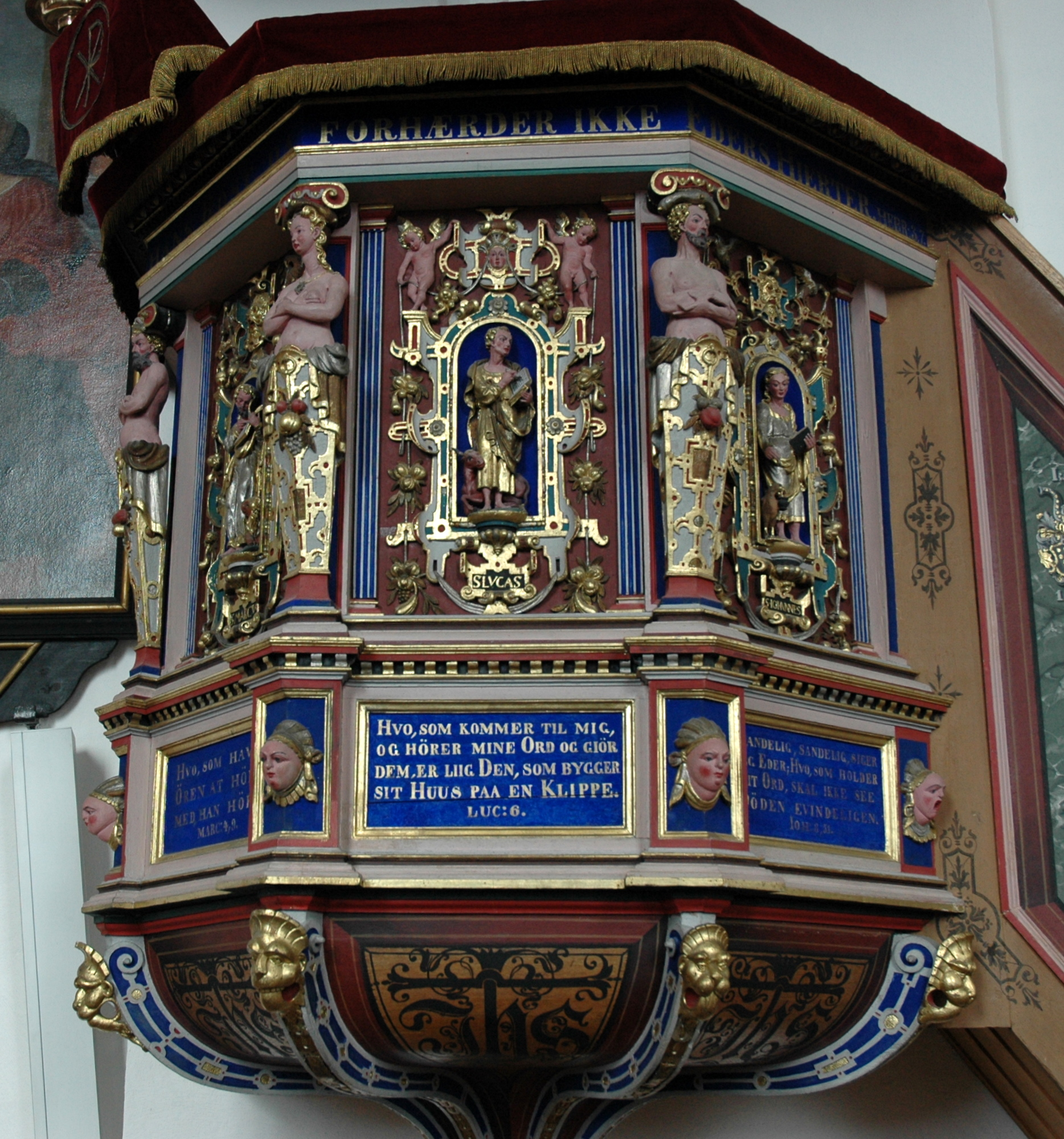
The decoration of the pulpit, pre-restoration.
