= Hans van Steenwinckel =

Hans van Steenwinckel may refer to:

- Hans van Steenwinckel the Elder (c. 1545–1601), Flemish architect and sculptor
- Hans van Steenwinckel the Younger (1587–1639), Danish architect and sculptor, son of the Elder
- Hans van Steenwinckel the Youngest (1638–1700), Danish architect and sculptor, son of the Younger

== See also ==
- van Steenwinckel, surname
