= Van Steenwinckel =

- Lorenz van Steenwinckel (1585–1619), Danish architect and sculptor, son of Hans van Steenwinckel the Elder
- Oluf van Steenwinckel (died 1659), building master, probably the son of Hans van Steenwinckel the Younger
- Hans van Steenwinckel (disambiguation)
