= Uraniborg =

Astronomical observatory in Sweden

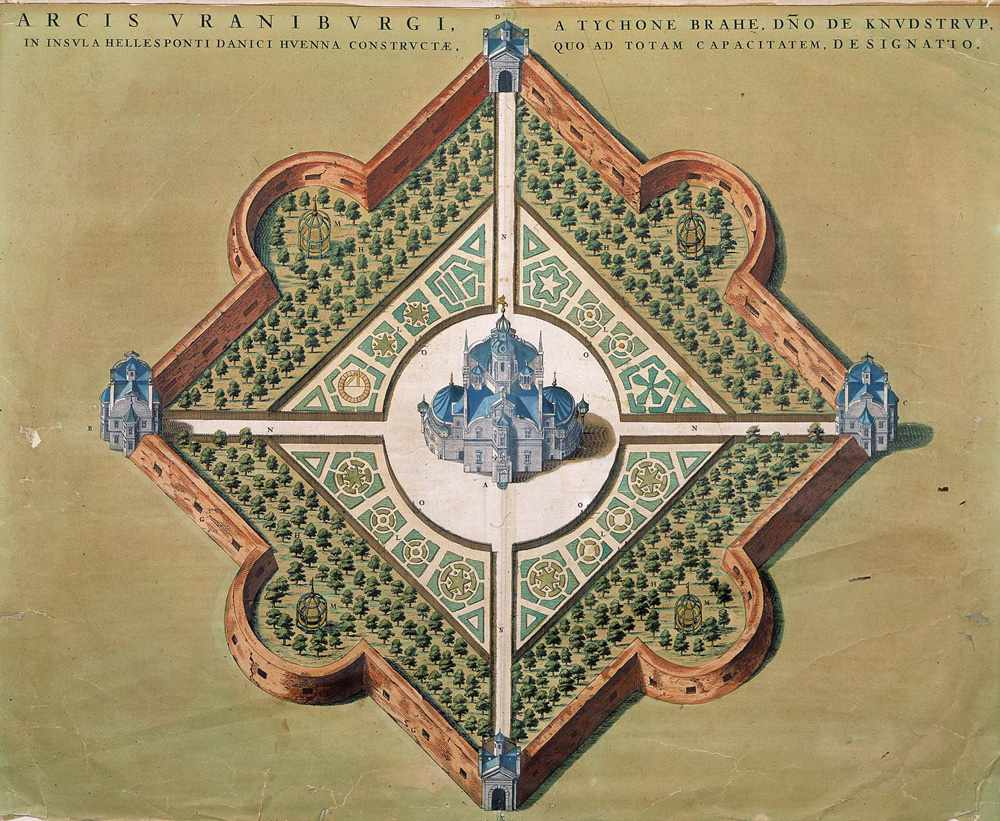
- Named after: Urania
- Location: Ven, Sweden
- Coordinates: 55°54′28″N 12°41′48″E
- Established: 1580
- Commercial telescopes: building
- Related media on Commons

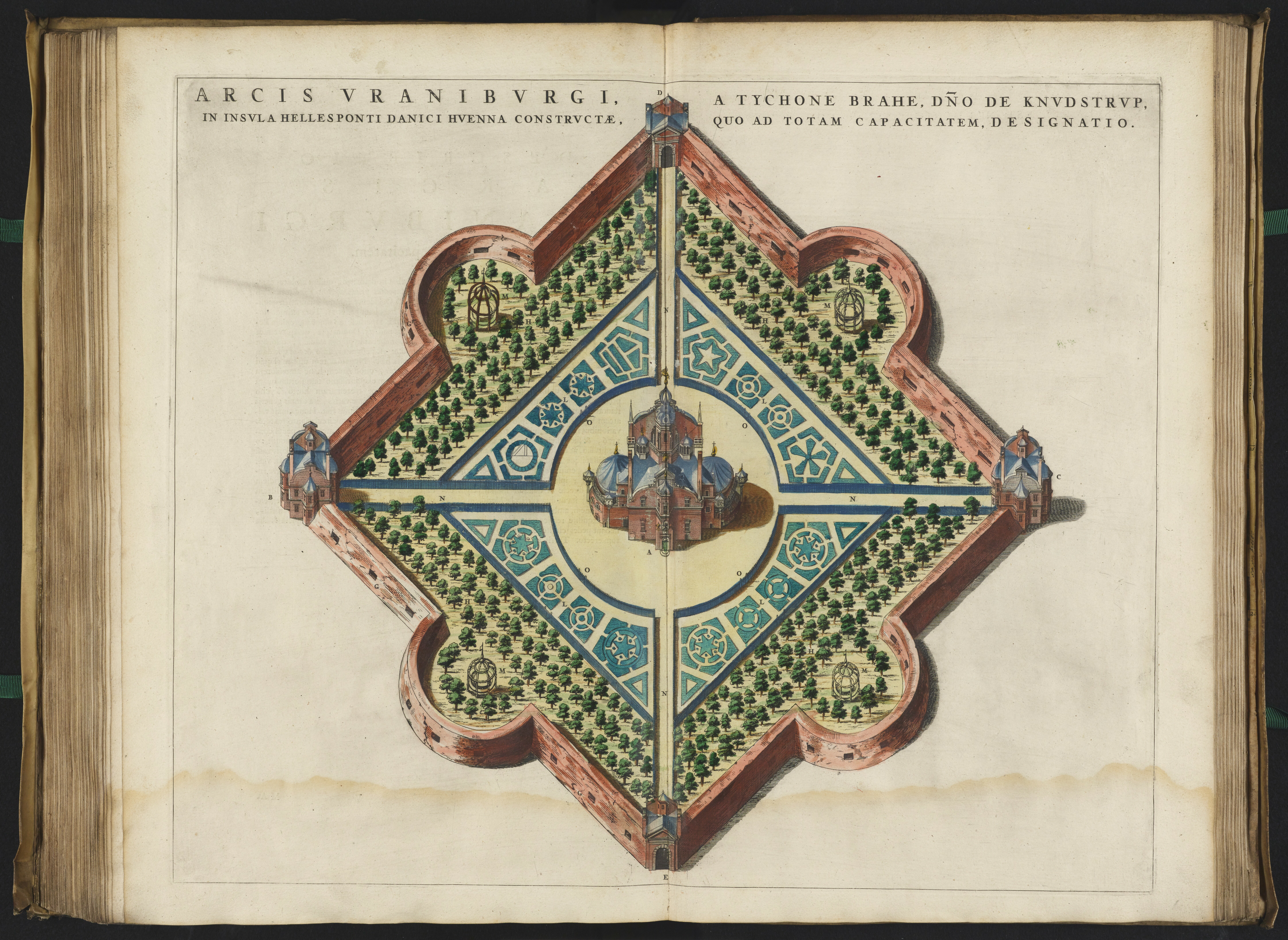
Tycho Brahe's Uraniborg from Blaeu's Atlas Maior (1663)

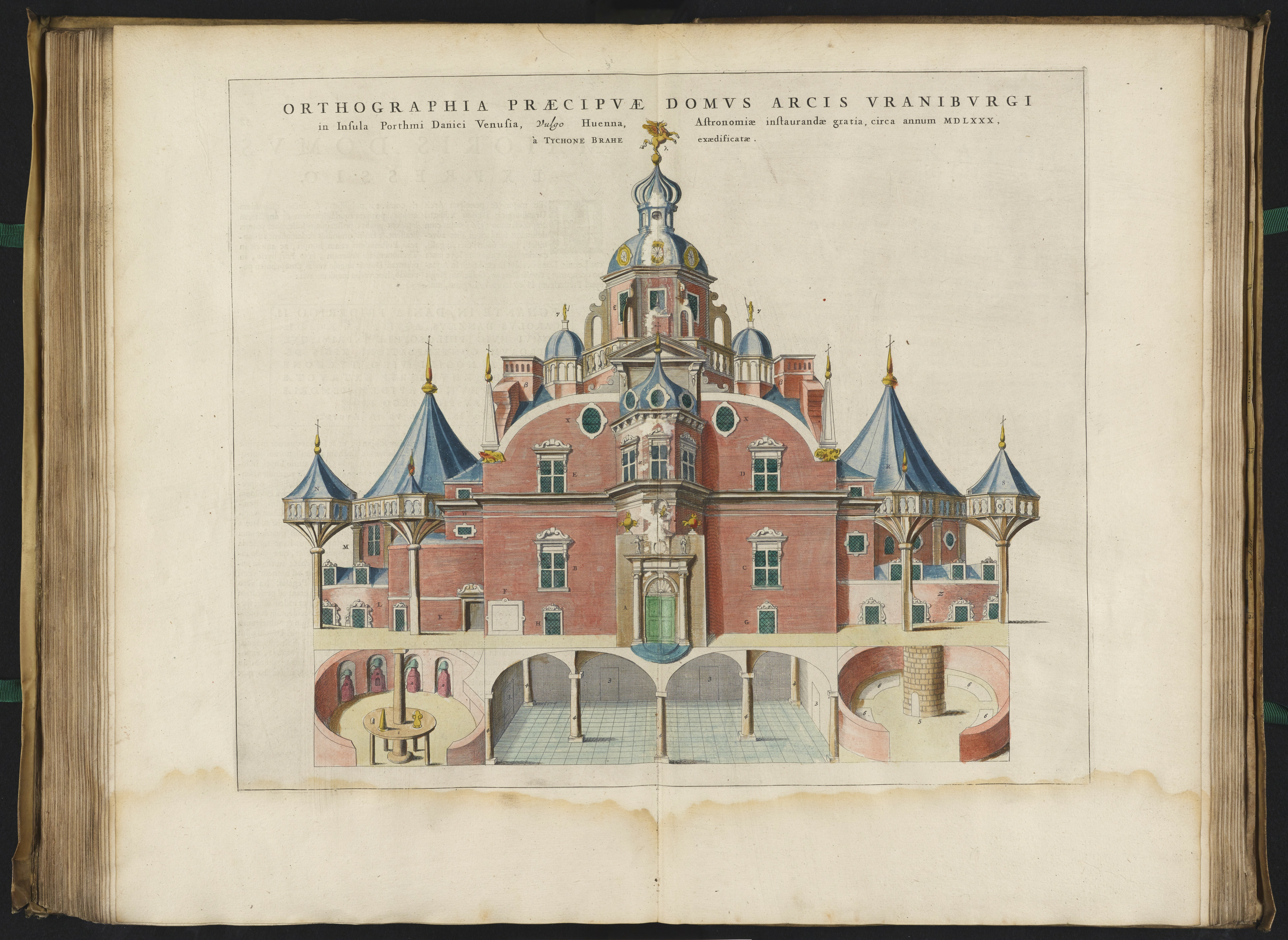
Tycho Brahe's Uraniborg main building from Blaeu's Atlas Maior (1663)

Uraniborg (Note: Swedish: Uraniborg, Danish: Uranienborg) was an astronomical observatory and alchemy laboratory established and operated by the Danish astronomer Tycho Brahe. It was the first custom-built observatory in modern Europe, and the last to be built without a telescope as its primary instrument.

Uraniborg was built c. 1576 – c. 1580 on Ven, an island in the Öresund between Zealand and Scania, Sweden, which was part of Denmark at the time. It was expanded with the underground facility Stjärneborg on an adjacent site.

Brahe also innovated and invented many precision instruments which he used to carry out his studies in the observatory. Research was done in the fields of astronomy, alchemy, and meteorology by Tycho and his assistants.

Brahe abandoned Uraniborg and Stjärneborg in 1597 after he fell out of favour with the Danish king, Christian IV of Denmark; Brahe left the country, and the institution was destroyed in 1601 after his death. Ven was later lost to Sweden, and the Rundetårn (Round Tower) in Copenhagen was inaugurated in 1642 as a replacement for Uraniborg's astronomical functions. Restoration of Uraniborg's grounds began in 1985.

== History ==
The building was dedicated to Urania, the Muse of Astronomy, and it was named Uraniborg, "The Castle of Urania". It was the first custom-built observatory in modern Europe, and the last to be built without a telescope as its primary instrument. The cornerstone was laid on August 8, 1576.

The sandstone and limestone-framed brick building was constructed from the year 1576 to 1580. Built in the Flemish Renaissance style, the erection of the site was overseen by Danish architect Hans van Emden and sculptor Johan Gregor van der Schardt. The main building of Uraniborg was square, about 15 meters on a side, and built mostly of red brick. Two semi-circular towers, one each on the north and south sides of the main building, gave the building a somewhat rectangular footprint overall.

The plan and façade of the building, and also the plan of the surrounding gardens, are designed on grids, with proportions that Tycho carefully specified. These proportions may have been intended to make Uraniborg function as an astrological talisman, benefiting the health of its occupants by increasing the influences of the Sun and Jupiter. The main floor consisted of four rooms, one of which was occupied by Brahe and his family, the other three for visiting astronomers.

The northern tower housed the kitchens, and the southern a library. In this library and within Brahe's personal study was etched the motto "Non haberi sed esse," which translates from Latin to "What one is, is more important than what one is perceived to be." It serves as a warning to discern perception from reality in pursuit of knowledge. The second floor was divided into three rooms, two of equal size and one larger. The larger room was reserved for visiting royalty; James VI of Scotland (later James I of England) visited on March 20, 1590.

On this level, the towers housed the primary astronomical instruments, accessed from outside the building or from doors on this floor. Balconies, supported on wooden posts, housed additional instruments slightly further from the building, giving them a wider angle of view. On the third floor was a loft, subdivided into eight smaller rooms for students. Only the roofs of the towers reached this level, although a single additional tower extended above the loft in the middle of the building, similar to a widow's walk, accessed via a spiral staircase from the 3rd floor. Uraniborg also featured a large basement. It housed an alchemical laboratory at one end, and storage for food, salt and fuel at the other. Uraniborg contained a small prison room, in order to deal with disorderly tenants or guests.

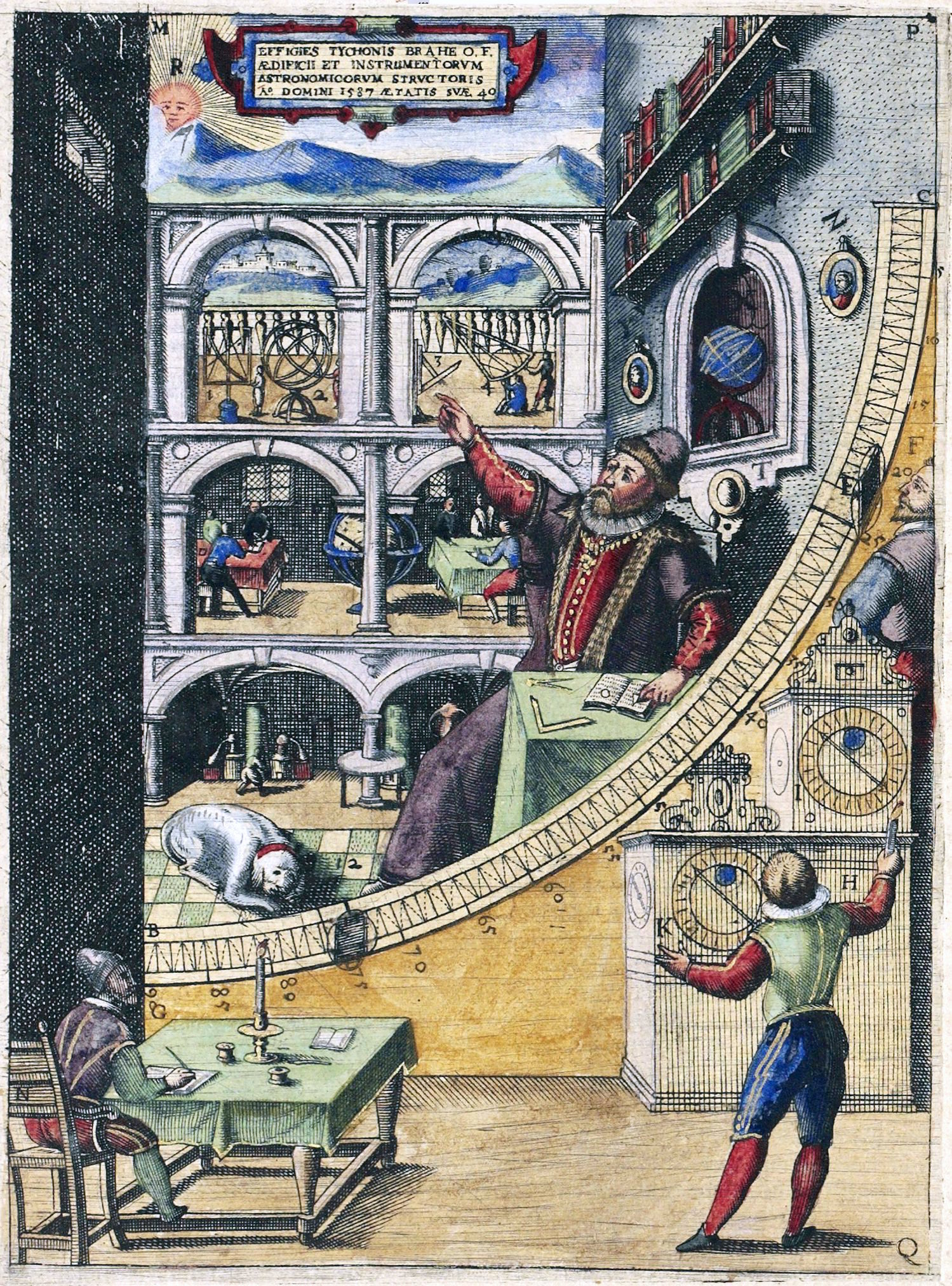
Engraving of the mural quadrant from Brahe's book Astronomiae instauratae mechanica (1598)

The observatory had a large mural quadrant affixed to a north–south wall, used to measure the altitude of stars as they passed the meridian. This, along with many other instruments of the observatory, was depicted and described in detail in Brahe's 1598 book Astronomiae instauratae mechanica.

A large wall, 75 meters on a side and 5.5 meters high, was planned to surround Uraniborg, but was never built; instead, a high earth mound was constructed. That mound has lasted until modern times, being the only remnant of the observatory still in place. Uraniborg was located in the very middle, with an extensive parterre garden between the mound walls and the building. In addition to being decorative, the gardens also supplied herbs for Brahe's medicinal chemistry experiments. The gardens are currently being re-created, using seeds found on-site or identified in Brahe's writings. At the gatehouses, Tycho incorporated his printing workshop and the island's prison.

Extending beyond the walls, Uraniborg's surrounding infrastructure included a system of aquaculture ponds, whose overflow powered a paper mill. In 1590 James VI of Scotland gave gold coins to builders and workmen at the paper and corn mills.

Uraniborg's construction was a unique phenomenon because it occurred at an interesting point in history. It not only was one of the last observatories built before the development of the telescope, but it was one of the first observatories to be completely funded by a government entity for the purpose of research. Uraniborg was an extremely expensive project and it is estimated that it cost about 1% of the entire state budget during construction.

Upon losing financial support from Frederick II's successor, Christian IV of Denmark, Brahe abandoned Ven in 1597. The new king was not a fan of Brahe and due to loss of popularity and funding at court, both astrological sites were destroyed shortly after Brahe's death. Stjärneborg was the object of archaeological excavations during the 1950s, resulting in the restoration of the observatory. Stjärneborg now houses a multimedia show.

== Research ==
This reprint of a map by Philippus Eckebrecht is based on Kepler's calculations that built on Brahe. It is centred on the Uraniborg meridian.

Uraniborg was a place for the study of astronomy, meteorology, astrology, and alchemy. Over the lifespan of Uraniborg it had upwards of thirty different assistants for Tycho Brahe, and visits from many other researchers and royalty; Martin Zeiler, Nicolaus Reimers, Erik Lange, and David Wunderer being some of the noted visitors. At its best, Brahe's data was accurate up to a minute of arc, an improvement of ten times compared to what was previously available.

While tracking the comet of 1577, Brahe saw inaccuracies with the location of stars in both Ptolemy's and Copernicus's systems. From then Brahe sought a better celestial map. Using both mathematics and observation from Uraniborg, Tycho Brahe released his first model of the celestial night in 1588, the Tychonic system. Brahe's system had Earth stationary in the center, the Moon and Sun revolving around it, Mercury, Venus, Mars, Jupiter, and Saturn revolving around the Sun, and the outermost circle where the stars rotate around. Paul Wittich visited Uraniborg for several months in 1580 and aided Brahe in the construction of the Tychonic system. Brahe had also researched meteorology for the King of Denmark, Frederick II, although Brahe did not put his name on the publications.

During the period in which Uraniborg was actively used, astronomy and astrology were thought to be linked to the other scientific fields, and as such the observatory was used to discover more than the astral bodies. Brahe's driving force for research at Uraniborg was the desire to make astrology an empirical science and rid it of "mistakes and superstition." Brahe and his many assistants began charting the positions of stars, planets, and other celestial bodies over time with unprecedented accuracy in this pursuit. While Brahe openly shared his findings in the field of astronomy and meteorology, he did not openly share his work in alchemy. Brahe's underground laboratory was designed to allow sunlight in throughout the day and had furnaces arranged so he could do his research even in the coldest months.

Though he did not publicly publish his findings, he did give them as gifts to other people of power. For example, Brahe allowed Arnold van Langren and Willem Jansz Blaeu, who were prominent Dutch globe makers of the time, access to his and his many assistants' work. Brahe's larger collection of his and his assistants' work in celestial cartography (a printed version of their star catalogue) was not published for public viewing until the year 1627 by his former assistant and fellow astronomer Johannes Kepler.

On his deathbed in 1601, Brahe urged Kepler to publish his proprietary Rudolphine Tables on Mars using his own cosmic system as the basis of explanation. Though Kepler did publish the tables as indicated by Brahe, he did so in an effort to endorse the Copernican model of the cosmos that placed the Sun as the center of the universe, in place of the Earth. Additionally, Kepler established the notion of elliptical orbits to replace the antiquated convention of perfectly circular orbits, an artifact of the Aristotelian cosmic system, in his publication.

Jean Picard, known for measuring lines of longitude, revisited the ruins of Uraniborg in 1671. He recorded the longitude and latitude of Uraniborg so astronomers could compare their research to Tycho's. Picard also went back to Uraniborg to study atmospheric refraction, which is the bending of light due to the atmosphere.

Shortly after construction it became clear that the tower-mounted instruments were too easily moved by wind, and Brahe set about constructing a more suitable observation site. The result was Stjärneborg ("castle of the stars"), a smaller site built entirely at ground level and dedicated purely to observations (there was no "house"). The basic layout was similar to Uraniborg, with a wall of similar shape surrounding the site, although the enclosed area was much smaller. The instruments were all placed underground, covered by opening shutters or a rotating dome in buildings built over the instrument pits. The research done at Stjärneborg paralleled the work done at Uraniborg but their notes were kept separate so that the research gathered at the observatories could be used to ensure that all of the data was accurate. Work had been started to connect Stjerneburg to Tycho's chemistry laboratory under Uraniborg but the tunnel was never completed.

== Instruments ==
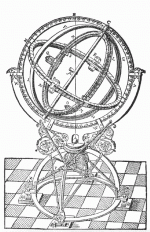
Brahe's 1581 armillary sphere

The observatory was not just the home of scientists, but it also supported the artisans who constructed the tools that the scientists needed. Tycho Brahe was an innovative astronomer of his time. Within the Uraniborg observatory, he utilized innovative observing methods and built new instruments to improve the accuracy of his readings. Brahe's goal to gather accurate data on the cosmos influenced the creation of a wide range of contraptions to prove his theories on the celestial positions and a geo-heliocentric (Tychonic) model of the Solar System, a theory that the Earth is the center of the Sun and Moon while the Sun is also the center of the other planets.

He upsized his instruments; one of the surviving instruments is the Brass Azimuthal Quadrant created in 1576. Instead of using wood as with previous models, he built the new one out of metal and masonry to enhance its stability and therefore improve the accuracy of his measurements. The azimuthal quadrant was meant to observe the Great Comet of 1577 with an accuracy of 48.8 seconds of an arc. He also used highly refined lenses and optical equipment in conjunction with other instruments, such as sextants and armillary spheres. To increase the accuracy of his readings further, he utilized the equatorial coordinate system instead of the zodiacal coordinate system with his specially designed instruments.

In 1580, Brahe created the Great Globe, a hollow, wooden sphere layered with brass plates to document the stars and planets he observed. By 1595, over 1,000 stars had been etched onto the globe. 777 of these were placed over the majority of Brahe's time at Uraniborg, and the last 223 just before he left. He and his assistants also tracked the movements of the planets over two decades.

In 1582, Brahe created the Triangular Sextant. This device was around 3.2 meters in diameter and was fixed in one place instead of being mobile like the smaller versions.

In 1585, Brahe created a larger instrument called the Great Equatorial Armillary, which allowed him to gauge planetary and stellar positions. This device was able to compensate for atmospheric refraction and it remained consistent with its measurements over time. This device was used extensively by Brahe in 1587 to further his work on the determination of Martian parallax, which he had previously attempted to calculate in 1582, 1583, and 1585, but without success due to the unavailability of the proper technology. Though scientists have determined in retrospect that Brahe could not have come to a meaningful conclusion due to errors in commonly used refraction tables of the era, the measurements taken by the Great Equatorial Armillary in conjunction with his other instruments led to unprecedented accuracy in his results and calculations.

Additionally, the structure itself and installation of the instruments was innovative for its time and was pivotal in the accuracy of the instruments. For instance, the upgraded mural quadrant, made from metal and stone, was fixed in place as a wall. This allowed for further accuracy in the measurements recorded by Brahe. The other smaller instruments that were more sensitive to interference from the weather were also fixed in place; they were installed in recesses in the ground to provide greater protection from the wind while still having the ability to measure stellar features. The observatory was also designed so that any exposed instruments on the upper levels of the towers were well protected from exposure.

== Restoration ==
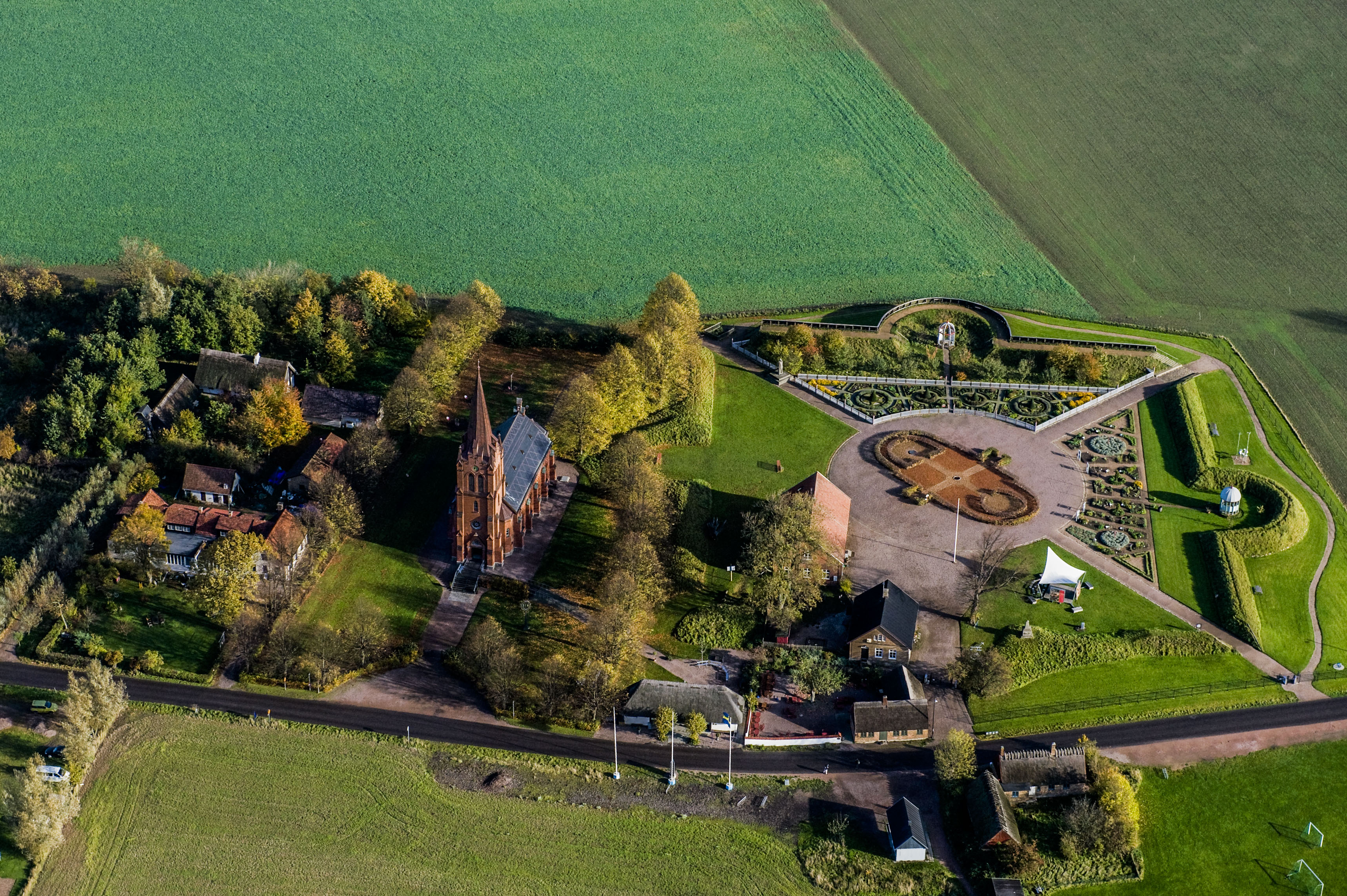
Modern aerial view

In the 1950s, an excavation effort revealed portions of the original Uraniborg structure and the structure of the underground laboratory space Stjärneborg, which was intended to shield Brahe's instruments from meteorological interference. Shortly after rediscovery, the external walls of the original place were reconstructed. A proposal was made to start the reconstruction of the original Uraniborg site during the 1980s. Restoration of the surrounding gardens began in 1985 with the goal of replanting of the 16th-century garden. Archaeological studies of the plant material were done by the Swedish University of Agricultural Sciences and the Landskrona Department of Culture in order to determine the plant type and location.

Later in 1992, a reconstruction plan for around one-quarter of the ramparts was created. This reconstruction plan included details on the ongoing work that also included the investigation of the structures, the plant material, and acquisitions and forms during the 1580s and 1590s. The new site now includes a restored quarter of Brahe's original garden with plants and herbs laid out in beds that are also boxed in with a wooden fence. A fruit orchard was also placed within the center of the pavilion. The refurbished structure of Uraniborg and Stjärneborg have been incorporated into the Tycho Brahe Museum. The grounds include stops at the ruined paper mill and the replica lake that once powered the palace laboratory during the time of Tycho Brahe. The Museum is accessible from both Sweden and Denmark by boat.

== See also ==
- List of astronomical observatories
- Sophia Brahe
