= Stjärneborg =

Tycho Brahe's underground observatory on the island of Ven

Coordinates: 55.9068°N 12.6967°E

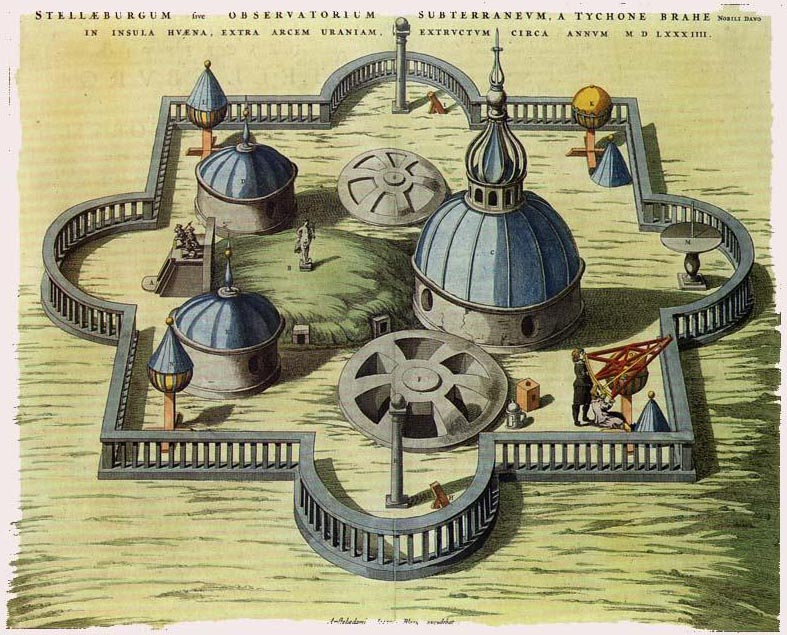
Drawing of an above-ground view of Stjärneborg

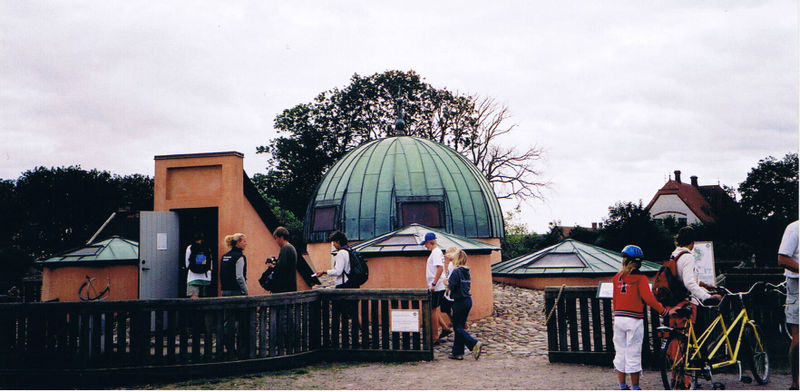
Stjärneborg as it exists today

Stjärneborg (Note: Swedish: Stjärneborg, Danish: Stjerneborg) ("Star Castle" in English) was Tycho Brahe's underground observatory next to his palace-observatory Uraniborg, located on Ven, an island in the Öresund between Zealand and Scania, Sweden, which was part of Denmark at the time.

Tycho Brahe built it circa 1581. He wrote: "My purpose was partly to have placed some of the most important instruments securely and firmly in order that they should not be exposed to the disturbing influence of the wind, and should be easier to use, partly to separate my collaborators when there were several with me at the same time, and have some of them make observations in the castle itself, others in these cellars, in order that they should not get in the way of each other or compare their observations before I wanted this." He named it Stiernburg in vernacular or Stellæburgus in Latin. The Swedish, Danish and Latin names mean "castle of the stars".

The underground portions of the observatory were excavated in the 1950s and are today fitted with a roof approximating the original one. The chambers now house a multimedia show open to the public.

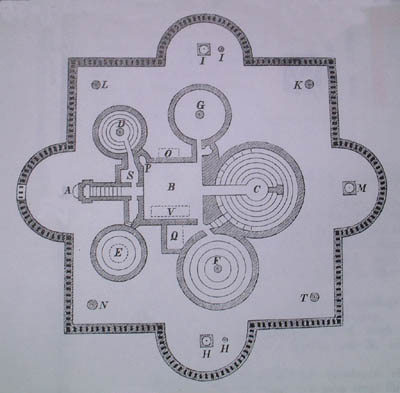
Schematic of Stjärneborg showing underground chambers Key to Schematic A = Entrance with steps leading down into the main workroom (B) and (D) and (E), above are three lion sculptures and Latin inscriptions B = The main Workroom containing (P) and (V) and passages to (C), (F), (G), and (Q) C = chamber with large equatorial instrument D = chamber with elevation and azimuth quadrant E = chamber with armillary sphere F = chamber with elevation and azimuth quadrant encompassed by a steel square G = chamber with sextant for measuring distances H = stone pillars one with a ball on top, the other angled, situated at the near side I = stone pillars one with a ball on top, the other angled, situated at the far side K, L, N and T = large balls, with conical covers, used for mounting instruments M = Stone table, shown with sundial in Willem Blaeu's drawing O = bed of Tycho Brahe P = fireplace Q = Tycho's assistant's bedroom S = beginning of an underground passage to Uraniborg V = worktable

== See also ==
- List of astronomical observatories

== Notes ==
Media related to Stjärneborg at Wikimedia Commons
