= Ven (Sweden) =

Island in the Öresund strait

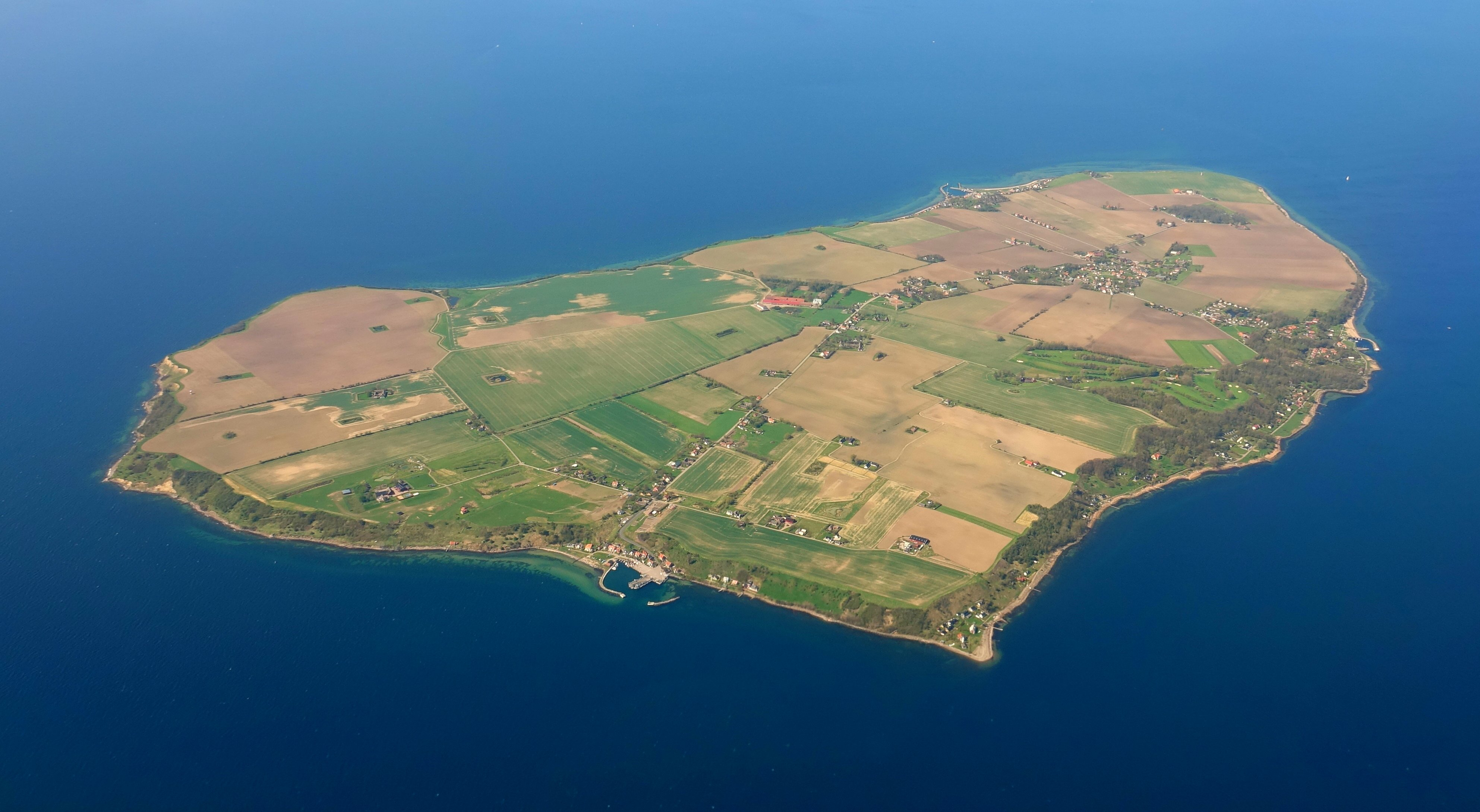
- Ven seen from the east
- Interactive map of Ven

Geography
- Location: Öresund strait
- Coordinates: 55°54′28″N 12°41′48″E
- Area: 7.5 km^{2} (2.9 sq mi)

Administration
- Sweden

Demographics
- Population: 371

Ven (Swedish: [veːn], older Swedish spelling Hven; Danish: Hven) is a Swedish island in the Öresund strait between Scania, Sweden and Zealand, Denmark. A part of Landskrona Municipality, Skåne County, the island has an area of 7.5 km^{2} (2.9 sq mi) and 371 inhabitants as of 2020. During the 1930s, the population was at its peak, with approximately 1,300 inhabitants. There are four villages on the island: Bäckviken, Tuna By, Norreborg and Kyrkbacken. The island is best known as the location of the observatories Uraniborg and Stjärneborg, both of which were established and operated by the Danish Renaissance astronomer Tycho Brahe.

== Geography ==
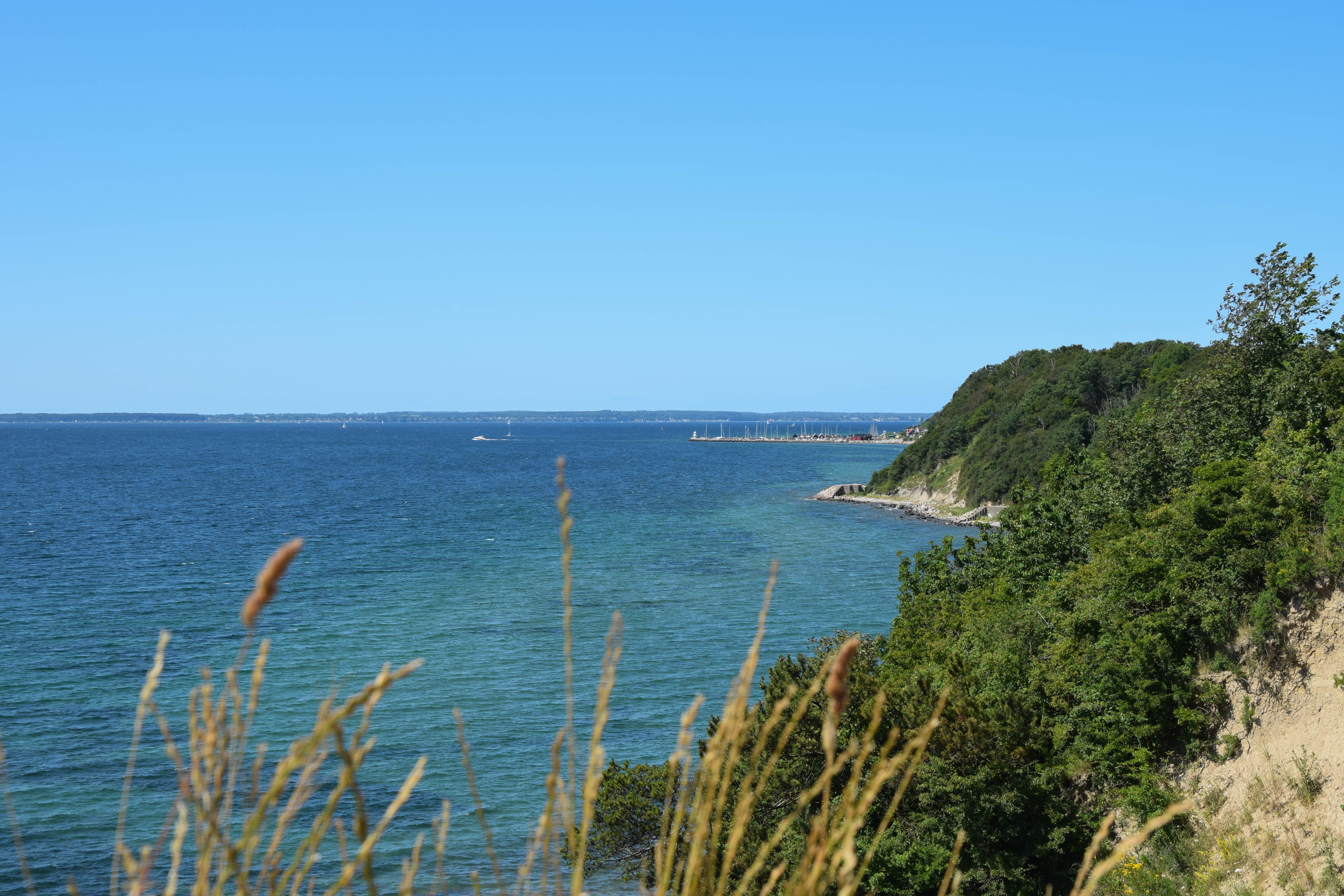
Typical landscape on Ven

The island is a single plateau that rises up to 45 meters above sea level. This highest point is located in the middle of the island, where the remains of Tycho Brahe's castle and observatory are located. The landscape is fertile thanks to the soil and the mild climate for Nordic conditions. The soil is moraine clay and therefore well suited for agriculture. It is one of the northernmost places in Europe where it is possible to grow durum wheat (Triticum durum).

Unlike the relatively flat Danish islands of Amager and Saltholm, Ven rises from the Öresund with steep and dramatic coastlines. This makes the island easily visible from both Zealand and Scania, as well as from all ships that sail in and out of the Baltic Sea. Its southern coastline resembles the White Cliffs of Dover, Møns Klint and Cape Arkona, but owing to a higher degree of sand and lower of chalk, the 50-metre-high (160-foot) cliffs are more yellow than white.

Along the entire coast, the island drops steeply towards the sea where the Öresund meets a rocky beach. This steep coast is called Backafall. Ven's backafall is a nature reserve established in 1990. There are no large forests, but smaller stands of trees occur closest to the coast. Due to the slightly higher altitude, the climate on the island in general is similar to that of the lower terrain coastal areas around Öresund.

The island has three smaller fishing ports: Bäckviken (where small ferries depart to Landskrona), Norreborg and Kyrkbacken. The last is located on the south-western coast just beneath the old church Sankt Ibb. This coast is known as Backafall.

== History ==
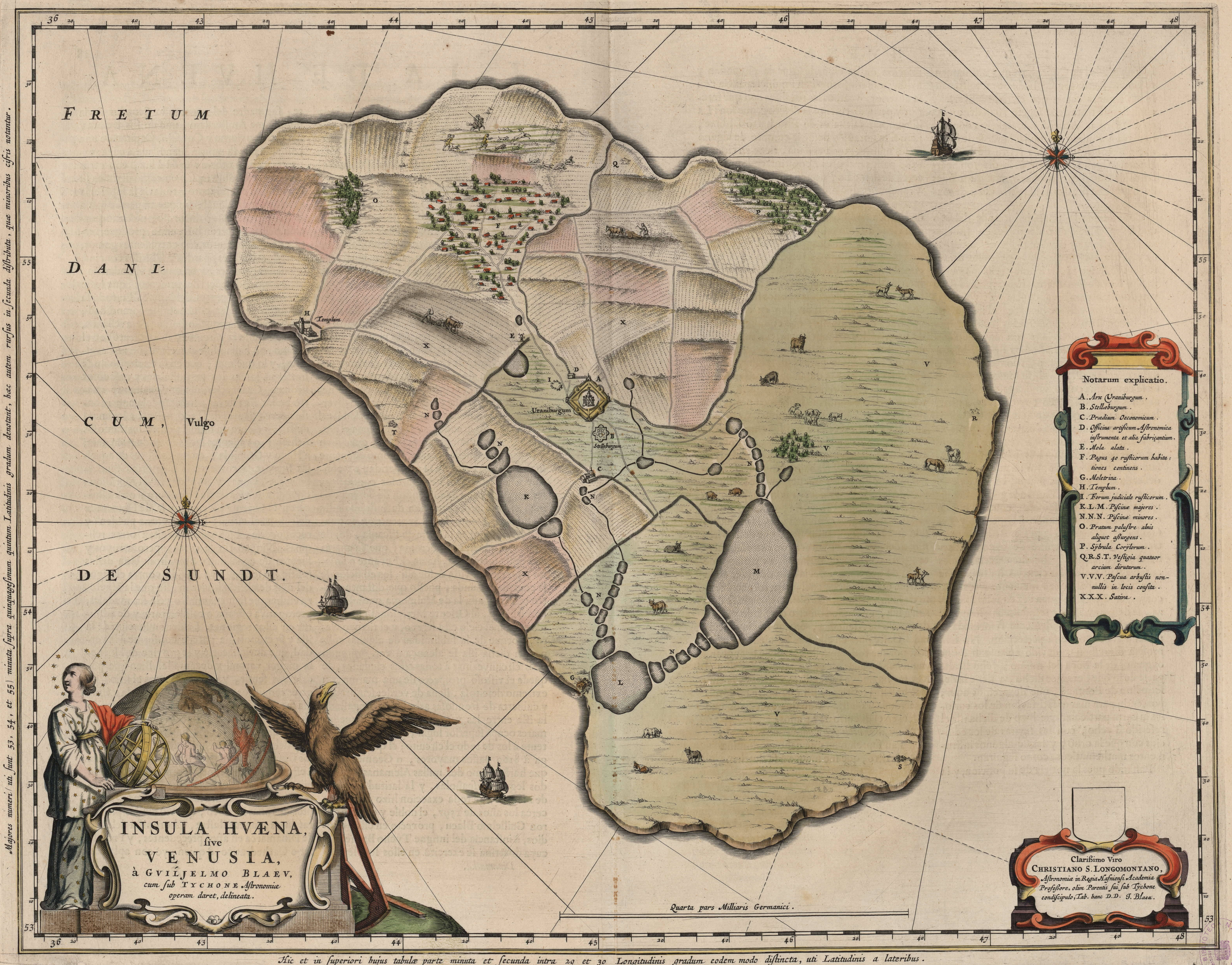
Map of Ven from the Blaeu Atlas of 1663, based on maps drawn by Tycho Brahe the previous century. Uraniborg is visible close to the centre.

The island was historically under Danish rule. Danish astronomer Tycho Brahe (1546–1601) built two observatories there, Uraniborg and Stjärneborg, during 1576–1596. The observatories were built by the inhabitants of the island with Tycho Brahe as their Lord.

The Swedish took over control in 1658, as the rest of Scania was ceded to Sweden by the Treaty of Roskilde. The island was not specifically mentioned in the treaty, and according to the Danes it was not part of Scania, but part of Zealand and therefore still under Danish rule. The Swedes did not agree with that interpretation, and sent troops to occupy the island on 6 May 1658. The transfer to Sweden was confirmed in 1660 by the Treaty of Copenhagen. The 350th anniversary of this transfer was commemorated on the island in 2010.

Two churches are located on this island. The older one, St Ibb's Church, is located at the top of a hill in the churchyard close to the west coast of the island, overlooking the Danish town of Rungsted. It was built in the 13th century and is a popular church for weddings. The younger church, which has been converted into a museum, is located in the middle of the island, near Uraniborg, one of the two observatories built by the astronomer Tycho Brahe. The asteroid 379 Huenna, which orbits halfway between Mars and Jupiter, is named for Ven.

Ven has ferries to Landskrona, and, in the summer only, to Helsingborg and Copenhagen. The ferries dock at Bäckviken. The island is a popular tourist destination, especially in summer. It is sometimes called "The pearl of Öresund". As the earth is rich in till, it is good for agriculture. Durum wheat and grapes are grown there.

== Representation in culture ==
Backafall on Ven is named in Gabriel Jönsson's poem Vid vakten. He also wrote the song "Flicka från Backafall" ("Girl from Backafall").

== Golf course ==
The island is home to the St Ibb Golf Club, founded in 1972 by Gösta Carlsson, who also operated nearby Barsebäck G&CC. The nine-hole par-68 course hosted the St Ibb Open, a professional tournament on the Swedish Golf Tour 2000–2010.

== Sights ==
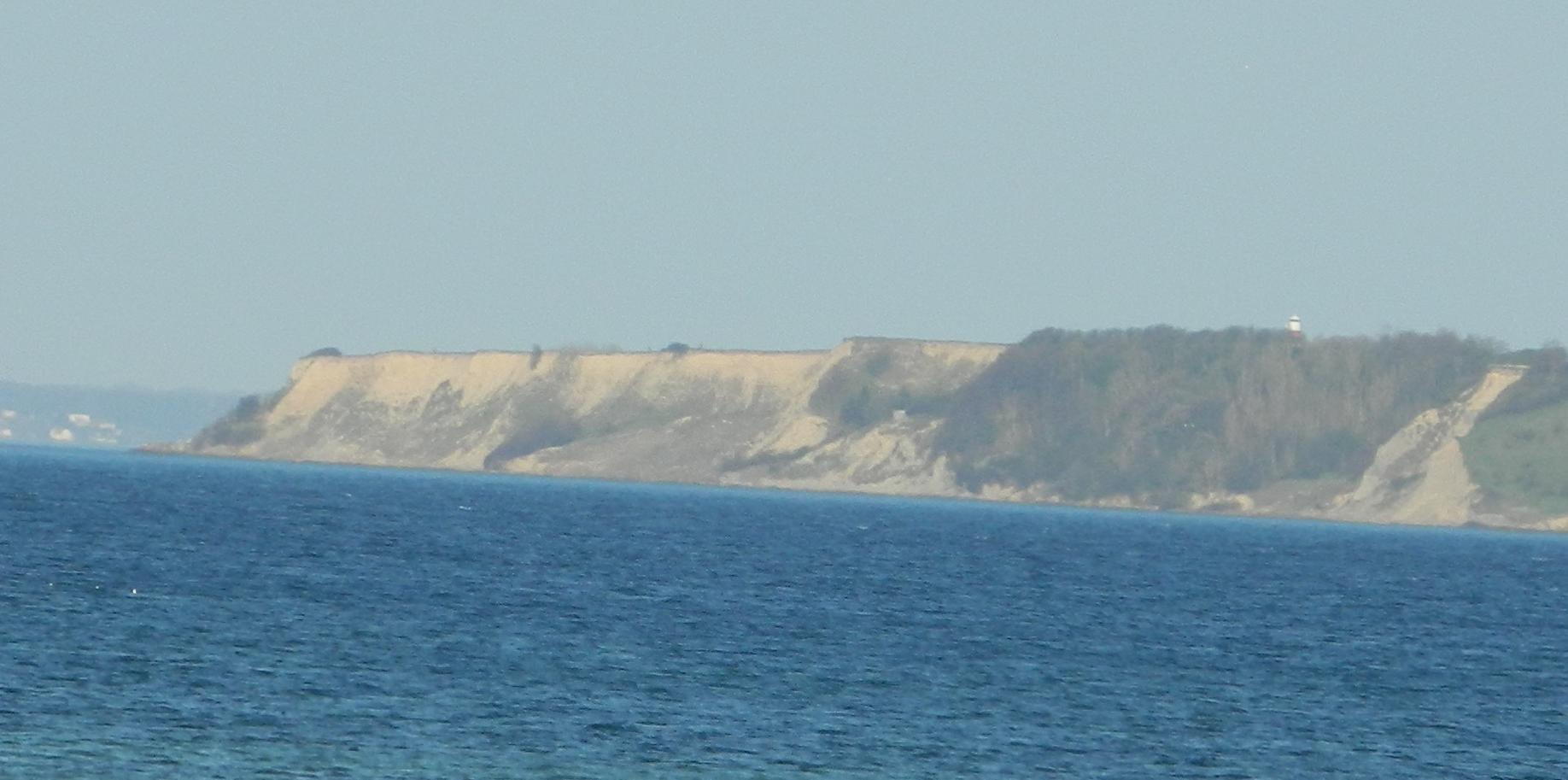
The dramatic southern coast. The yellowish rather than white colour of the cliffs indicates more sand than chalk.

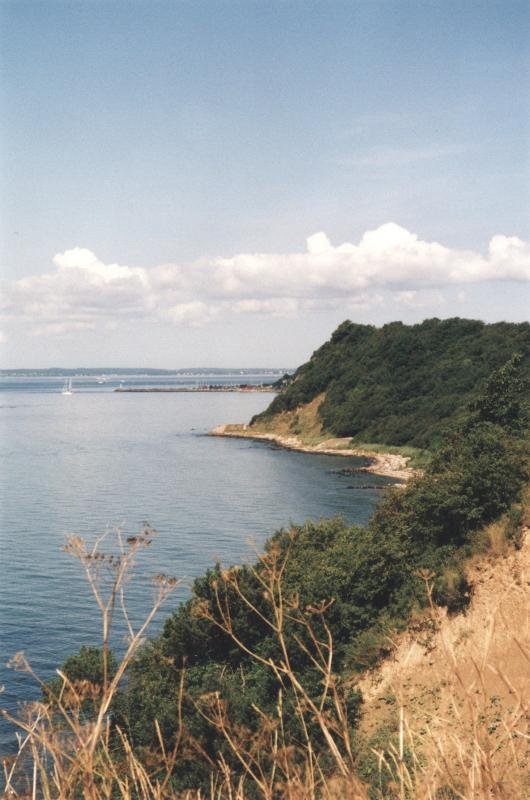
Backafall, the south-west coast of Ven

One of the fields of Ven

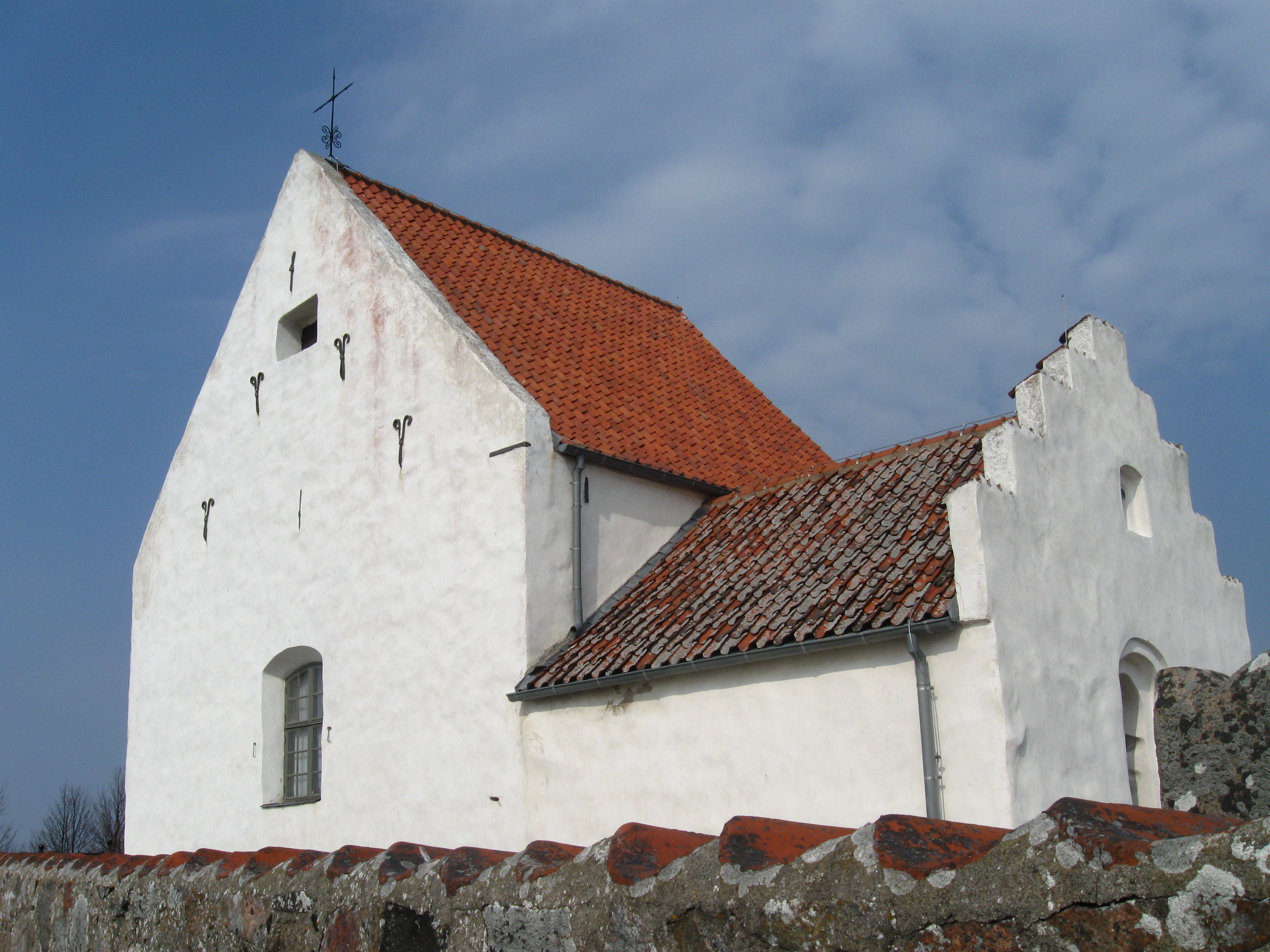
St Ibb's Church

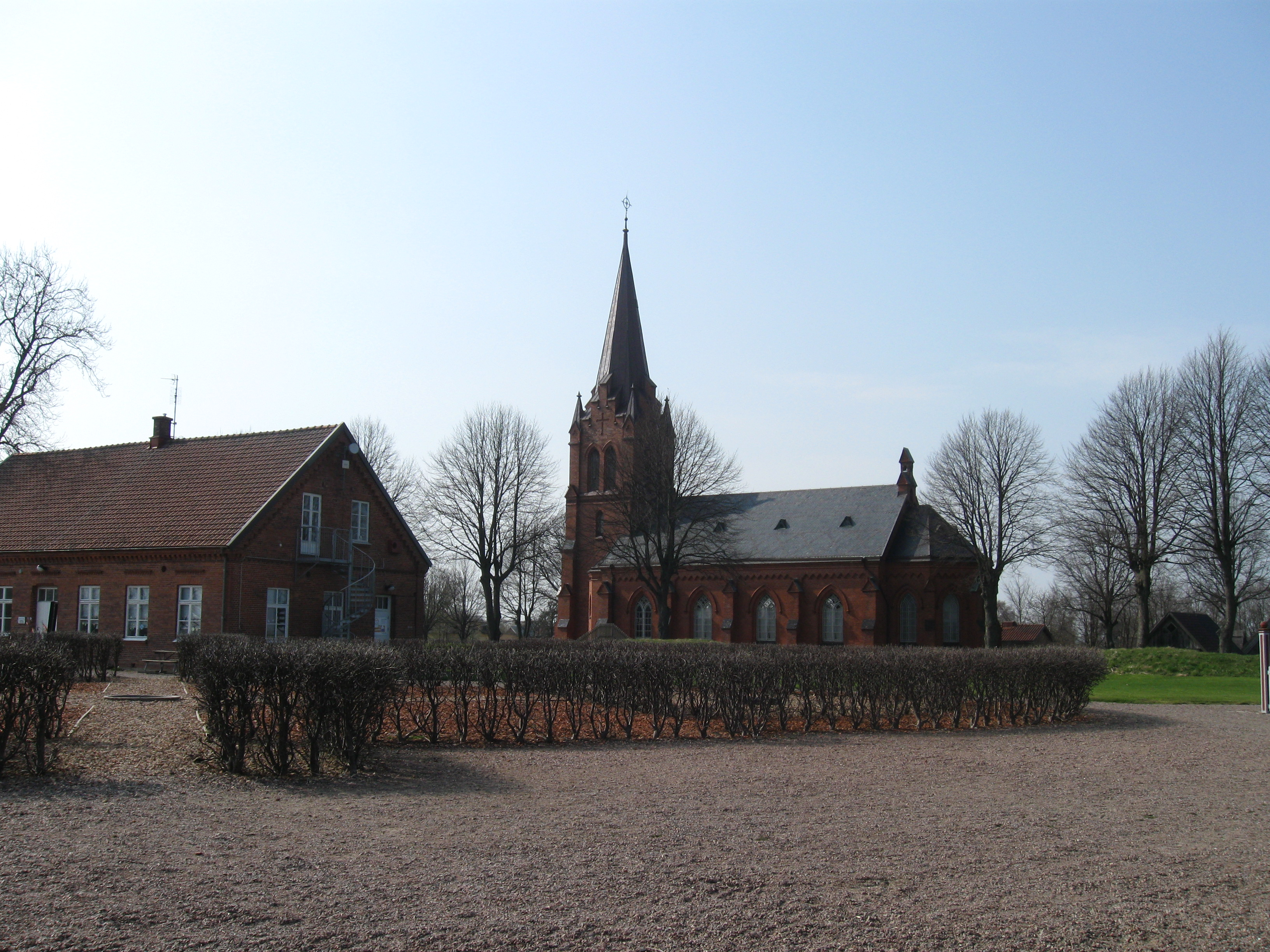
The New Church of Ven, currently a museum

== See also ==
- List of islands of Sweden
