= Marcel Boll =

Marcel Boll (15 September 1886 – 12 August 1971) was a French scientist, sociologist, philosopher, educator, scientific journalist (journalist specializing in scientific topics), and a founding member (1930) of the Rationalist Union (French: Union rationaliste).

Boll was one of the most prolific contributors of articles to Les Cahiers Rationalistes (The Rationalist Notebooks) and Raison Présente (Reason Present), two journals published by the Rationalist Union. He was one of the main popularizers of the theory of relativity, the quantum theory, and other aspects of the physical sciences during the interwar period (1918–1939) and in the early 1950s. An advocate of neopositivism, his numerous works on physics, philosophy, sociology, education, and other subjects all reflect his neopositivist perspective. He was the first person to draw the French public's attention to the Vienna Circle (German: der Wiener Kreis). Louis Rougier (1889–1982) and Général Charles-Ernest Vouillemin (1865–1954) later joined Boll in being among the first to introduce and promote the Vienna Circle and its overall philosophical outlook (logical positivism) in France.

== Life and work ==
Boll was born and died in Paris. He was a son of a councilor of the Council of Paris. In 1910 Marcel was approved to sit for the examination known as the Agrégation de sciences physiques at the ESPCI Paris (Higher School of Industrial Physics and Chemistry of the City of Paris), in which examination he scored in 11th place. In 1914 he graduated from ESPCI Paris with a Doctorate in physical sciences, his doctoral thesis being titled Recherches sur l'évolution photochimique des électrolytes (1914) (Research on the Photochemical Evolution of Electrolytes). He then found employment as an engineer at ESPCI Paris, where he advanced his career, receiving 23 promotions during his time there. Later he became Professor of Chemistry and Electricity at HEC Paris (École des Hautes Etudes Commerciales de Paris).

He had a brother named André Boll (1896–1983). In the 1930s through the 1950s, Marcel and André tried to launch a cultural movement inspired by neopositivist scientific, philosophical, and sociological insights. The goal of this movement was the establishment of modernism, rationalism, and scientism in all areas of society. The Boll brothers proposed to achieve this goal through the cultivation of "intellectual elitism" in individuals, primarily via character-building, basing the process solely on implementation of a system of neopositivistic scientific, philosophical, and sociological principles, thus keeping the project free of all non-scientific political and financial interference or bias. In order to promote these ideas Marcel and André co-authored two books, titled L'art contemporain, sa raison d'être, ses manifestations (1931) (Contemporary Art, its Reason for Being, its Manifestations) and L'élite de demain (1946) (The Elite of Tomorrow).

Boll edited works by various members of the Vienna Circle and the Berlin Circle (German: die Berliner Gruppe), including works by philosophers Moritz Schlick, Rudolf Carnap, Philipp Frank, and Hans Reichenbach. The translations of these works were made by others.

== Works ==
- (1914) - Recherches sur l'évolution photochimique des électrolytes (Paris: Gauthier-Villars et Cie) (Series: Faculté des sciences de Paris, no. 761, no. d'ordre 1537) (99 p., with diagrams) (doctoral thesis in science) (Research on the Photochemical Evolution of Electrolytes)
- (1918) - Cours de chimie à l'usage des candidats aux grandes écoles (Dunot & Pinat)
- (1919) - L’Électron et les phénomènes chimiques (Hermann)
- (1921) - Attardés & précurseurs : propos objectifs sur la métaphysique et sur la philosophie de ce temps et de ce pays (Chiron)
- (1921) - La Science et l'esprit positif chez les penseurs contemporains
- (1922) - Euclide, Galilée, Newton, Einstein. Pour que tout le monde sache de quoi il s'agit, Éditions d'actualités
- (1922) - (en coll. avec Achille Delmas) La personnalité humaine son analyse, Flammarion, Bibliothèque de philosophie scientifique
- (1925) - Tendances actuelles de la philosophie française (Attardés et précurseurs)
- (1927) - Précis de physique, en collaboration avec André Féry (Dunod)
- (1928) - Introduction à la théorie des quantas, avec Charles Salomon (Doin)
- (1929) - L’Électron et les applications de l'électricité (Albin Michel éditeur)
- (1929) - Matière, électricité, radiation. Ce qu'il faut connaitre pour suivre le progrès de la physique actuelle (Delagrave)
- (1931) - Qu'est ce que : Le hasard, l'énergie, le vide, la chaleur, la lumière, l'électricité, le son, l'affinité (Larousse)
- (1932) - L'Électricité à la ville, à la campagne, en auto (Larousse)
- (1932) - Exposé électronique des lois de l'électricité (Hermann et Cie éditeurs)
- (1932) - L’Idée générale de la mécanique ondulatoire et ses premières applications (Atome d’hydrogène, phénomènes chimiques, conduction électrique) (Hermann)
- (1934) - L’Atomistique (Les atomes et les molécules, structures électroniques, capillarité et osmose, les colloïdes, la catalyse) (Le François)
- (1934) - Théorie de la connaissance et physique moderne (Hermann et Cie éditeurs)
- (1934) - Pour connaître : la relativité, l'analogie, l'inertie, la gravitation, le choc, l'incandescence, la fréquence (Larousse)
- (1934) - La Science ses progrès ses applications " avec Georges urbain (2 vols.) (Paris: Librairie Larousse)
- (1935) - La Logique et la caricature dans les questions actuelles
- (1936) - La Chance et les jeux de hasard : boule, roulettes, baccara, bridge, poker, belote, etc. (Larousse)
- (1936) - La science des caractères dans ses relations avec la méthode scientifique (éd. Hermann) (38 p.)
- (1938) - Les Deux Infinis : galaxies, étoiles, planètes, micelles, réseaux, noyaux, neutrons, photons (Larousse)
- (1939) - Les quatre faces de la physique (Ch. Rieder)
- (1941) - Quelques Sciences captivantes : Ondes humaines, délires collectifs, hypnotisme, psychanalyse, suggestion, métapsychie, astrologie, spiritisme, radiesthésie (Sagittaire)
- (1941) - Les Étapes des mathématiques, coll. Que sais-je ? (no 42) (PUF)
- (1941) - Le Mystère des nombres et des formes (Larousse)
- (1942) - Éléments de logique scientifique (Dunod)
- (1942) - Memento du chimiste I. Partie scientifique, 2e éd. mise à jour par M. Boll (en collaboration avec Paul Baud) (Dunod)
- (1943) - Les Certitudes du hasard; coll. Que sais-je ? (no 3) (PUF)
- (1943) - L'Exploitation du hasard (Presses universitaires); (Editura contemporana, Bucarest, 1944); (coll. Que sais-je ?, no 57, PUF, 1947)
- (1944) - L'Occultisme devant la science
- (1944) - Nouvelle académie des jeux - Le bridge plafond, contrat (Le Triboulet)
- (1945) - L'Atome, source d'énergie (Presses documentaires)
- (1946) - Électricité - Magnétisme (PUF)
- (1948) - Manuel de logique scientifique
- (1948) - Le Secret des couleurs, en collaboration avec Jean Dourgnon (PUF)
- (1950) - Radio, radar, télévision (Larousse)
- (1950) - L'Occultisme devant la science (PUF)
- (1952) - Physique appliquée à l'art dentaire (J.-B Baillère et fils éditeurs)
- (1953) - Les Étapes de la connaissance, en collaboration avec Jean-Claude Pages (Hermann)
- (1954) - L´Éducation du jugement (PUF)
- (1954) - Les Étapes de la logique, en collaboration avec Jacques Reinhart (Maison Madelain)
- (1955) - Les Étapes de la mécanique (PUF)
- (1957) - Tables numériques universelles des laboratoires et bureaux d'étude (Dunod)
- (1958) - La Personnalité, en collaboration avec Francis Baud (Masson et Cie)
- (1961) - Histoire de la logique, en collaboration avec Jacques Reinhart
