= Erkenntnis =

- Discipline: Philosophy
- Language: English; German (until mid-1990s)
- Edited by: Hannes Leitgeb

Publication details
- History: 1930–1940 (first series); 1975–present (second series)
- Publisher: Springer (Netherlands)

Standard abbreviations
- ISO 4: Erkenntnis

Indexing
- CODEN: ERKEDQ
- ISSN: 0165-0106 (print); 1572-8420 (web)
- LCCN: 75647016
- JSTOR: 01650106
- OCLC no.: 915460912

Links
- Journal homepage; Online access; Online archive

Erkenntnis is a journal of philosophy that publishes papers in analytic philosophy. Its name is the German word "Erkenntnis", meaning "knowledge, recognition, insight". The journal was also linked to organisation of conferences, such as the Second Conference on the Epistemology of the Exact Sciences, of which it published the papers and accounts of the discussions.

== First series (1930–1940) ==
When Hans Reichenbach and Rudolf Carnap took charge of Annalen der Philosophie und philosophischen Kritik in 1930, they renamed it Erkenntnis, under which name it was published from 1930 to 1938. The journal was published by the Gesellschaft für Empirische Philosophie, or the Berlin Circle and the Verein Ernst Mach, Vienna. In the first issue Reichenbach wrote that the editors hoped to gain a better understanding of the nature of all human knowledge through consideration of the procedures and results of a variety of scientific disciplines, while also hoping that philosophy need not remain a series of "systems" but could reach the state of objective knowledge. The final issue of the first series, Volume 8, No. 1, was published in 1939 and retitled The Journal of Unified Science (Erkenntnis) (1939–1940) and included as associate editors Philipp Frank, Jørgen Jørgensen (da:Jørgen Jørgensen_filosof), Charles W. Morris, Otto Neurath, and Louis Rougier. The advent of World War II led to the cessation of publication.

== Second series (1975–present) ==
In 1975 the journal was "refounded" by Wilhelm K. Essler, Carl G. Hempel, and Wolfgang Stegmüller, and it has been published continuously since. The editor-in-chief is Hannes Leitgeb (LMU Munich), and the supervisory board comprises Michael Friedman (Stanford University), Hans Rott (University of Regensburg), and Wolfgang Spohn (Konstanz University).

== See also ==
- List of philosophy journals
