= International Encyclopedia of Unified Science =

Series of monographs published from 1938 to 1969

The International Encyclopedia of Unified Science (IEUS) was a series of publications devoted to unified science. The IEUS was conceived at the Mundaneum Institute in The Hague in the 1930s, and published in the United States beginning in 1938. It was an ambitious project that was never completed.

The IEUS was an output of the Vienna Circle to address the "growing concern throughout the world for the logic, the history, and the sociology of science..." Only the first section Foundations of the Unity of Science (FUS) was published; it contains two volumes for a total of nineteen monographs published from 1938 to 1969.

== International Congresses for the Unity of Science ==
Creation of the IEUS was facilitated by the International Congresses for the Unity of Science organized by members of the Vienna Circle. After a preliminary conference in Prague in 1934, the First International Congress for the Unity of Science was held at the Sorbonne, Paris, 16–21 September 1935. It was attended by about 170 people from over twenty different countries. With the active involvement of Kazimierz Ajdukiewicz (Poland), Susan Stebbing (England), and Federigo Enriques (Italy) the scope of the project for an IEUS was considerably expanded. The congress expressed its approval of the planned IEUS as proposed by the Mundaneum, and further set up a committee to plan future congresses. This committee included the following members:

- Marcel Boll
- Percy Williams Bridgman
- Henri Bonnet
- Niels Bohr
- Rudolf Carnap
- Élie Cartan
- Jacob Clay
- Morris Raphael Cohen
- Federigo Enriques
- Phillip Frank
- Maurice René Fréchet
- Ferdinand Gonseth
- Jacques Hadamard
- Maurice Janet
- Herbert Spencer Jennings
- Jørgen Jørgensen
- Hans Kelsen
- Tadeusz Kotarbiński
- André Lalande
- Paul Langevin
- Karl Lashley
- Clarence Irving Lewis
- Jan Łukasiewicz
- Richard von Mises
- Charles W. Morris
- Otto Neurath
- Charles Nicolle
- Charles Kay Ogden
- Jean Baptiste Perrin
- Hans Reichenbach
- Abel Rey
- Charles Rist
- Louis Rougier
- Bertrand Russell
- Moritz Schlick
- Susan Stebbing
- Joseph Henry Woodger

The Third International Congress for the Unity of Science, which was devoted exclusively to the IEUS, was held in Paris, 29–31 July 1937.

== Volume I ==
Encyclopedia and Unified Science (FUS I-1)
Otto Neurath, Niels Bohr, John Dewey, Bertrand Russell, Rudolf Carnap, and Charles Morris

Foundations of the Theory of Signs (FUS I-2)
Charles Morris

Foundations of Logic and Mathematics (FUS I-3)
Rudolf Carnap

Linguistic Aspects of Science (FUS I-4)
Leonard Bloomfield

Procedures of Empirical Science (FUS I-5)
Victor F. Lenzen

Principles of the Theory of Probability (FUS I-6)
Ernest Nagel

Foundations of Physics (FUS I-7)
Philipp Frank

Cosmology (FUS I-8)
E. Finlay-Freundlich

Foundations of Biology (FUS I-9)
Felix Mainx

The Conceptual Framework of Psychology (FUS I-10)
Egon Brunswik

== Volume II ==
Foundations of the Social Sciences (FUS II-1)
Otto Neurath

The Structure of Scientific Revolutions (FUS II-2)
Thomas S. Kuhn

Science and the Structure of Ethics (FUS II-3)
Abraham Edel

Theory of Valuation (FUS II-4)
John Dewey

The Technique of Theory Construction (FUS II-5)
Joseph H. Woodger

Methodology of Mathematical Economics and Econometrics (FUS II-6)
Gerhard Tintner

Concept Formation in Empirical Science (FUS II-7)
Carl G. Hempel

The Development of Rationalism and Empiricism (FUS II-8)
George De Santillana, Edgar Zilsel

The Development of Logical Empiricism (FUS II-9)
Joergen Joergensen

Bibliography and Index (FUS II-10)
Herbert Feigl, Charles Morris

== Influence ==
Historian David Hollinger argued that the IEUS was a less comprehensive account of the sciences of the time than it could have been, and was especially weak in the social sciences. Hollinger noted that the Encyclopaedia of the Social Sciences, published around the same time, provided a much more comprehensive account of the social sciences: "The Encyclopedia of the Social Sciences (12 vols., New York, 1933–1937) was a prodigious endeavor brought to successful completion by Alvin Johnson. This encyclopedia is a much more important episode in the history of thought than The International Encyclopedia of Unified Science yet has attracted much less attention from historians than the abortive enterprise led by Neurath." Hollinger also said that the scholarly journal Philosophy of Science, founded in 1934, provided a much more inclusive perspective on the sciences in those years than did the IEUS.

== See also ==
- Encyclopedism
- Van Nostrand's Scientific Encyclopedia – published in 1938, the same year as the first monograph in the IEUS
- World Brain – published in 1938, the same year as the first monograph in the IEUS
- World Congress of Universal Documentation – held in Paris in 1937 a few weeks after the Third International Congress for the Unity of Science
