= Louis Rougier =

French philosopher (1889–1982)

Louis Auguste Paul Rougier (French: [ʁuʒje]; 10 April 1889 – 14 October 1982) was a French philosopher who introduced the idea of neoliberalism to France in the 1930s. Rougier made many important contributions to epistemology, philosophy of science, political philosophy and the history of Christianity.

== Early life ==
Rougier was born in Lyon. Debilitated by pleurisy in his youth, he was declared unfit for service in World War I and devoted his adolescence to intellectual pursuits. He studied philosophy under Edmond Goblot.

After receiving the agrégation in philosophy from the University of Lyon, he qualified as a philosophy teacher in 1914 and worked as a teacher in several high schools, before teaching at the École Chateaubriand de Rome, Besançon, the Cairo University, the Institut Universitaire des Hautes Études Internationales de Genève (Geneva Graduate Institute of International Studies), and the Fondation Édouard-Herriot (Édouard-Herriot Foundation) in Lyon.

In 1920 he obtained his doctorate from the Sorbonne and published his doctoral thesis as La philosophie géometrique de Poincaré and Les paralogismes du rationalisme. Rougier already had several publications to his name, however, beginning with a 1914 paper on the use of non-Euclidean geometry in relativity theory.

== Career ==
Rougier taught in Algiers from 1917 to 1920 and then in Rome from 1920 to 1924. His first university appointment in France was at the University of Besançon in 1925, where he served on the faculty until his dismissal in 1948 for political reasons. Further university appointments were in Cairo from 1931 to 1936, the New School for Social Research from 1941 to 1943 and the Université de Montréal in 1945. Rougier's final academic appointment was to the Université de Caen in 1954, but he retired at the age of 66 after only one year there.

== Philosophy ==
Under the influence of Henri Poincaré and Ludwig Wittgenstein, Rougier developed a philosophy based on the idea that systems of logic are neither apodictic (i.e., necessarily true and therefore deducible) nor assertoric (i.e., not necessarily true and whose truth must therefore be induced through empirical investigation). Instead, Rougier proposed that the various systems of logic are simply conventions that are adopted based on contingent circumstances.

That view, which implies that there are no "objective" a priori truths that exist independently of the human mind, closely resembled the logical positivism of the Vienna Circle. Many members of that group, including Philipp Frank, greatly admired Rougier's 1920 work Les paralogismes du rationalisme. Rougier soon became the group's main French associate and formed close personal ties to several of its leading members, including Moritz Schlick (to whom Rougier's 1955 book Traité de la connaissance is dedicated) and Hans Reichenbach. Rougier also participated as an organizer and contributor to many Vienna Circle activities, including the International Encyclopedia of Unified Science. Rougier's own contribution to the Encyclopedia never materialized, however, because he soon became one of many participants who ended up quarreling with Otto Neurath, the project's editor-in-chief.

== Religion ==
Rougier's conventionalist philosophical position naturally led him to oppose neo-Thomism, which had been the official philosophy of the Roman Catholic Church since the 1879 encyclical Aeterna Patris but was gaining particular momentum during the 1920s and the 1930s. Rougier published several works during this period attacking the contemporary revival of scholasticism, thereby earning the personal enmity of prominent Thomists such as Étienne Gilson and Jacques Maritain.

Rougier's objections to neo-Thomism were not merely philosophical, however, but formed part of a general opposition to Christianity that he had already begun to develop during his adolescence under the influence of Ernest Renan. His early opposition to Christianity continued to influence intellectual work of Rougier's maturity and led him in 1926 to publish a translation of Celsus that is still in use today.

== Politics ==
Rougier was also a political philosopher in the liberal tradition of Montesquieu, Constant, Guizot and Tocqueville. Consistent with his conventionalist epistemology, Rougier believed that political power does rest upon eternally-valid claims, which he called mystiques. The only possible reason to prefer one political system over another, he believed, depends not on such eternal truths but purely on pragmatic grounds. In other words, political systems should be chosen not based on how "true" they are but rather on how well they work.

After visiting the Soviet Union in 1932 on a visit sponsored by the French Ministry of Education, Rougier became convinced that a planned economy does not work as well as a market economy. That conviction led him to participate in the organization of the first neoliberal organization of the 20th century, the Colloque Walter Lippmann, in 1938. That year, Rougier helped to found the Centre international d'études pour la rénovation du libéralisme. The political network established by both groups eventually led to the 1947 foundation of the famous Mont Pelerin Society to which Rougier was elected in the 1960s through the personal backing of Friedrich Hayek.

Rougier, as one of the founding fathers of neoliberalism, would no doubt have been admitted to the first meeting of the Mont Pelerin Society but for a second political engagement, which proved disastrous to his career and his reputation: his activities on behalf of the Vichy regime in France during World War II. In October 1940, French Head of State Philippe Pétain sent Rougier on a secret mission to the British government in London, where Rougier met with Winston Churchill between 21 and 25 October.

Rougier later claimed in several published works that these meetings resulted in an agreement between Vichy and Churchill that he called the Mission secrète à Londres : les Accords Pétain-Churchill, an allegation that the British government later denied in an official White Paper. Although those activities and publications eventually led to Rougier's dismissal in 1948 from his teaching position at the University of Besançon, he continued to be active throughout the 1950s in organisations that defended Pétain. He also published works denouncing the épuration, the French equivalent of denazification, which was carried out on the formerly-Vichy territory by the Allies after the war, as illegal and totalitarian. Finally, Rougier was active in an effort that petitioned the United Nations in 1951 by alleging that the Allies had committed human rights violations and war crimes during the Libération.

In the 1970s, Rougier formed a second controversial political alliance: with the Nouvelle Droite of the French writer Alain de Benoist. Rougier's long-standing opposition to Christianity, together with his conviction that "the West" possesses a pragmatically superior mentalité to those of other cultures, aligned closely with the views of that movement. Benoist reissued and wrote prefaces to several of Rougier's earlier works, and in 1974, Benoist's thinktank, GRECE, published an entirely-new book by Rougier: Le conflit du Christianisme primitif et de la civilisation antique.

== Death ==
Rougier died in Paris. He lived to the age of 93 and was survived by his third wife, Lucy Elisabeth (née Herzka) Friedmann (1903–1989). Dr. Friedmann, whom he married in 1942, was a former secretary to Moritz Schlick. Although Friedman had a daughter from a previous marriage, Rougier himself had no children.

== Selected works ==
- 1919. La matérialisation de l'énergie: essai sur la théorie de la relativité et sur la théorie des quanta. Paris: Gauthier-Villars. English translation by Morton Masius: 1921. Philosophy and the new physics; an essay on the relativity theory and the theory of quanta. Philadelphia: P. Blakiston's Son & Co.; London: Routledge.
- 1920. La philosophie géométrique de Henri Poincaré. Paris: F. Alcan.
- 1920. Les paralogismes du rationalisme: essai sur la théorie de la connaissance. Paris: F. Alcan.
- 1921. En marge de Curie, de Carnot et d'Einstein: études de philosophie scientifique. Paris: Chiron.
- 1921. La structure des théories déductives; théorie nouvelle de la déduction. Paris: F. Alcan.
- 1924. La scolastique et le thomisme. Paris: Gauthier-Villars.
- 1929. La mystique démocratique, ses origines, ses illusions. Paris: E. Flammarion.
- 1933. L'origine astronomique de la croyance pythagoricienne en l'immortalité céleste des âmes. Cairo: L'institut français d'archéologie orientale.
- 1938. Les mystiques économiques; comment l'on passe des démocraties libérales aux états totalitaires. Paris: Librairie de Médicis.
- 1945. Les accords Pétain, Churchill: historie d'une mission secrète. Montréal: Beauchemin.
- 1945. Créance morale de la France. Montréal: L. Parizeau.
- 1947. La France jacobine. Bruxelles: La Diffusion du livre.
- 1947. La défaite des vainqueurs. Bruxelles: La Diffusion du livre.
- 1947. La France en marbre blanc: ce que le monde doit à la France. Genève: Bibliothèque du Cheval ailé.
- 1948. De Gaulle contre De Gaulle. Paris: Éditions du Triolet.
- 1954. Les accord secrets franco-britanniques de l'automne 1940; histoire et imposture. Paris: Grasset.
- 1955. Traité de la connaissance. Paris: Gauthier-Villars.
- 1957. L'épuration. Paris: Les Sept couleurs.
- 1959. La religion astrale des Pythagoriciens. Paris: Presses Universitaires de France.
- 1960. La métaphysique et le langage. Paris: Flammarion.
- 1966. Histoire d'une faillite philosophique: la Scolastique. Paris: J.-J. Pauvert.
- 1969. Le Génie de l'Occident: essai sur la formation d'une mentalité. Paris: R. Laffont. English translation: 1971. The Genius of the West. Los Angeles: Nash.
- 1972. La genèse des dogmes chrétiens. Paris: A. Michel.
- 1974. Le conflit du Christianisme primitif et de la civilisation antique. Paris: GRECE.
- 1980. Astronomie et religion en Occident. Paris: Presses universitaires de France.

== Sources ==
- Allais, Maurice (1990). Louis Rougier, prince de la pensée. Lourmarin de Provence: Les Terrasses de Lourmarin.
- Marion, Mathieu (2004). "Investigating Rougier". Cahiers d'épistémologie (2004–02). Université du Québec à Montréal.
- Mehlman, Jeffrey (2000). Emigre New York: French Intellectuals in Wartime Manhattan, 1940-44. Baltimore and London: Johns Hopkins University Press. ISBN 0-8018-6286-8.
