= Charles W. Morris bibliography =

The following is a bibliography of Charles W. Morris.

== Books by Charles W. Morris ==
Some books are available for viewing online.

- Charles W. Morris (1925). Symbolism and Reality: A Study in the Nature of Mind. Dissertation, University of Chicago. Reprinted, Amsterdam: John Benjamins, 1993. Translated into German, Symbolik und Realitat, with an introduction by A. Eschbach. Frankfurt: Suhrkamp, 1981.
- Charles W. Morris (1932). Six Theories of Mind. Chicago: University of Chicago. Reprinted, 1966.
- Charles W. Morris (1937). Logical Positivism, Pragmatism and Scientific Empiricism. Paris: Hermann et Cie. Reprinted, New York: AMS Press, 1979.
- Charles W. Morris (1942). Paths of Life: Preface to a World Religion. New York: Harper and Brothers.
- Charles W. Morris (1946). Signs, Language and Behavior. New York: Prentice-Hall, 1946. Reprinted, New York: George Braziller, 1955. Reprinted in Charles Morris, Writings on the General Theory of Signs (The Hague: Mouton, 1971), pp. 73–397. Translated into Italian, Segni, linguaggio e comportamento, by S. Ceccato. Milan. Translated into German, Zeichen, Sprache und Verhalten, by A. Eschbach and G. Kopsch. Düsseldorf: Schwann, 1973.
- Charles W. Morris (1948). The Open Self. New York: Prentice-Hall; Translated into Swedish, Öppna Er Själv by Ann Bouleau. Stockholm: 1949.
- Charles W. Morris (1956). Varieties of Human Value. Chicago: University of Chicago Press. Reprinted, 1973.
- Charles W. Morris (1964). Signification and Significance: A Study of the Relations of Signs and Values. Cambridge, Mass.: MIT Press. Chap. 1, "Signs and the Act," is reprinted in Charles Morris, Writings on the General Theory of Signs (The Hague: Mouton, 1971), pp. 401–414.
- Charles W. Morris (1970). The Pragmatic Movement in American Philosophy. New York: George Braziller.
- Charles W. Morris (1971). Writings on the General Theory of Signs. Den Haag: Mouton.
- Charles W. Morris (1973). Cycles. Gainesville: University of Florida Press.
- Charles W. Morris (1975). Zeichen Wert Äesthetik. Mit einer Einleitung hg. u. übers. v. A. Eschbach. Frankfurt: Suhrkamp.
- Charles W. Morris (1976). Image. New York: Vantage Press.
- Charles W. Morris (1977). Pragmatische Semiotik und Handlungstheorie. Mit einer Einleitung hg. und übers. v. A. Eschbach. Frankfurt: Suhrkamp.

== Other works by Charles W. Morris ==
Some works are available for viewing online.

- "The Total-Situation Theory of Ethics." International Journal of Ethics 37 (1927): 258-268.
- "The Concept of the Symbol I." Journal of Philosophy 24 (1927): 253-262.
- "The Concept of the Symbol II." Journal of Philosophy 24 (1927): 281-291.
- "Review of G. Lanoe-Villene, Le Livre des Symboles: Dictionnaire de Symbolique et de Mythologie." Journal of Philosophy 24 (1927): 581-583.
- "The Prediction Theory of Truth." Monist 38 (1928): 387-401.
- "Neo-Pragmatism and the Ways of Knowing." Monist 38 (1928): 494-501.
- "Has Russell Passed the Tortoise?" Journal of Philosophy 26 (1929): 449-459.
- "The Relation of Formal to Instrumental Logic." In T. V. Smith and W. K. Wright, eds, Essays in Philosophy (Chicago: University of Chicago, 1929), pp. 253–268.
- "The Nature of Mind." Three lectures delivered at the Rice Institute on January 6, 13, and 20, 1929. Rice Institute Pamphlet, vol. 16, no. 44 (Houston, 1929), pp. 153–244.
- "Review of A. Spaier, La Penseé Concrète: Essai sur le symbolisme intellectual." Philosophical Review 38 (1929) 407-410.
- "Review of G. A. De Laguna, Speech, Its Function and Development."
- "Review of J. F. Markey, The Symbolic Process and Its Integration in Children." Philosophical Review 38 (1929): 612-615.
- "Review of The Problem of Truth: University of California Lectures Delivered before the Philosophical Union, 1927-28." Journal of Philosophy 26 (1929): 356-360.
- "A Reply to Prof. Schilpp." Monist 40 (1930): 321-323.
- "Review of H. Dingler, Metaphysik der Wissenschaft vom Letzten." Philosophical Review 39 (1930): 508-513.
- "Review of University of California Publications in Philosophy, vol. 2: Studies in the Nature of Truth." Journal of Philosophy 27 (1930): 210-215.
- "Mind in Process and Reality." Journal of Philosophy 28 (1931): 113-127.
- "Review of C. A. Strong, Essays on the Natural Origin of the Mind." Philosophical Review 40 (1931): 590-592.
- "Truth, Action, and Verification." Monist 42 (1932): 321-329.
- "Review of L. A. Dewe, Les deux ordres, psychique et matériel." Philosophical Review 41 (1932): 87-88.
- "Review of G. F. Stout, Mind and Matter." Philosophical Review 41 (1932): 410-413.
- "Review of T. Whittaker, Prolegomena to a New Metaphysics." Ethics 42 (1932): 470-471.
- "Review of D. S. Robinson, An Introduction to Living Philosophy." Ethics 42 (1932): 469-470.
- "Review of J. Wahl, Vers le Concret: Etudes d'Histoire de la Philosophie Contemporaine." Journal of Philosophy 30 (1933): 714-716.
- Pragmatism and the Crisis of Democracy. Public Policy Pamphlet No. 12. Chicago: University of Chicago, 1934.
- "Introduction." To George H. Mead, Mind, Self, and Society. Chicago: University of Chicago, 1934.
- "Pragmatism and Metaphysics." Philosophical Review 43 (1934): 549-564. Reprinted in Logical Positivism, Pragmatism, and Scientific Empiricism (Paris: Hermann et Cie., 1937), pp. 31–45.
- "Review of R. W. Sellars, The Philosophy of Physical Realism." Philosophical Review 43 (1934): 205-208.
- "Brief Bibliography of Contemporary Scientific Philosophy in the United States." Erkenntnis 5 (1935) 195-199.
- "Philosophy of Science and Science of Philosophy." Philosophy of Science 2 (1935): 271-286. Reprinted in Logical Positivism, Pragmatism, and Scientific Empiricism (Paris: Hermann et Cie., 1937), pp. 7–21. An abstract is in Journal of Philosophy 32 (1935): 292.
- "The Relation of the Formal and Empirical Science within Scientific Empiricism." Erkenntnis 5 (1935) 6-14. Reprinted in Logical Positivism, Pragmatism, and Scientific Empiricism (Paris: Hermann et Cie., 1937), pp. 46–55.
- "Some Aspects of Recent American Scientific Philosophy." Erkenntnis 5 (1935–36) 142-151.
- "Review of F. C. S. Schiller, Must Philosophers Disagree?" Personalist 16 (1935): 388-390.
- "Professor Schiller and Pragmatism." Personalist 17 (1936): 294-300.
- "Semiotic and Scientific Empiricism." In Actes du Congrès International de Philosophie Scientifique 1935, vol. 1 (Paris: 1936), pp. 2–16. Reprinted in Logical Positivism, Pragmatism, and Scientific Empiricism (Paris: Hermann et Cie., 1937), pp. 56–71.
- "Remarks on the Proposed Encyclopaedia." Actes du Congrès International de Philosophie Scientique. vol. 2: Unité de la Science (Paris: 1936), pp. 71–74.
- "The Concept of Meaning in Pragmatism and Logical Positivism." In Actes du Huitième Congrès International de Philosophie, Prague, Czechoslovakia, 2–7 September 1936 (Prague: 1936. Rpt., Nendeln und Liechtenstein: Kraus Reprint, 1968), pp. 130–138. Reprinted in Logical Positivism, Pragmatism, and Scientific Empiricism (Paris: Hermann et Cie., 1937), pp. 22–30.
- "Review of Einheit der Wissenschaften: Prager Vorkonferenz der Internationalen Kongresse für Einheit der Wissenschaft." Philosophy of Science 3 (1936): 542-543.
- "Review of O. Neurath, Le dévéloppement du Cercle de Vienne et l'avenir de 1'empirisme logique." Philosophy of Science 3 (1936): 542-543.
- "Symposium of Unified Science." Philosophy of Science 4 (1937): 496-498.
- "The Unity of Science Movement and the United States." Synthese 3 (1938): 25-29.
- "Introduction." To George H. Mead, The Philosophy of the Act, ed. Charles W. Morris, in collaboration with J. M. Brewster, A. M. Dunham and D.L. Miller (Chicago: University of Chicago 1938), pp. vii-lxxiii.
- "Scientific Empiricism." International Encyclopedia of Unified Science, ed. Otto Neurath, vol. 1, no. 1 (Chicago: University of Chicago Press, 1938), pp 63–75.
- "Foundations of the Theory of Signs." International Encyclopedia of Unified Science, ed. Otto Neurath, vol. 1 no. 2. (Chicago: University of Chicago Press, 1938. Rpt, Chicago: University of Chicago Press, 1970–71). Reprinted in Charles Morris, Writings on the General Theory of Signs (The Hague: Mouton, 1971), pp. 13–71. Translated into Italian, Lineamenti di una teoria dei segni, by F. Rossi-Landi, with his introduction and commentary. Turin, Milano, Padua: 1963. Translated into German, Grundlagen der Zeichentheorie: Äesthetik und Zeichentheorie, by R. Posner and J. Rehbein. Munchen: Hanser, 1972. Translated into Spanish, Fundamentos de la teoría de los signos, by Rafael Grasa. Barcelona: Paidós, 1985.
- "Peirce, Mead and Pragmatism." Philosophical Review 47 (1938): 109-127.
- "General Education and the Unity of Science Movement." In John Dewey and the Promise of America, Progressive Education Booklet No. 14 (Columbus, Ohio: Progressive Education Association 1939), pp. 26–40.
- "Science, Art and Technology." Kenyon Review 1 (1939): 409-423.
- "Esthetics and the Theory of Signs." Erkenntnis 8 (1939): 131-150. Reprinted in Charles Morris, Writings on the General Theory of Signs (The Hague: Mouton, 1971), pp. 415–433.
- "Review of P. W. Bridgman, The Intelligent Individual and Society." Review of Scientific Instruments 10 (1939): 122.
- "Semiotic, the Socio-Humanistic Sciences, and the Unity of Science." Erkenntnis 9 (1940).
- "Knowledge and Social Practice." Frontiers of Democracy 6 (1940): 150-152.
- "The Mechanism of Freedom." In Freedom, Its Meaning, ed. R.N. Anshen (New York: 1940), pp. 579–589.
- "The Search for a Life of Significance. The Work of Raymond Jonson, American Painter." Tomorrow 1 (1941): 16-21.
- "Review of P. Frank, Between Physics and Philosophy." Astrophysical Journal 94 (1941): 555.
- "Empiricism, Religion, and Democracy." In Science, Philosophy, and Religion: Second Symposium, ed. L. Bryson, ed. (New York: 1942), pp. 213–242.
- "William James Today." In Commemoration to William James, ed. Horace M. Kallen, ed. (New York: 1942). pp. 178–187.
- "Freedom or Frustration." Fortune 28 (1943): 148-152 and 162-174.
- "Commentary on A. Kaplan, ‘Content Analysis and the Theory of Signs’." Philosophy of Science 10 (1943): 230-247 and 247-249.
- "The Social Assimilation of Cultural Relativity." In Approaches to World Peace, ed. L. Bryson et al. (New York: 1944), pp. 619–626.
- "Liberation from the Machine Mind." Biosophical Review 7 (1944): 9-10.
- "Review of A. S. Clayton, Emergent Mind and Education: A Study of George H. Mead's Bio-Social Behaviorism from an Educational Point of View." Journal of Philosophy 41 (1944): 108-109.
- "Review of National Society of College Teachers of Education, Yearbook no. 28: The Discipline of Practical Judgment in a Democratic Society." Journal of Philosophy 41 (1944): 302-304.
- "Communication: Its Forms and Problems." In Approaches to National Unity, ed. L. Bryson (New York: 1945), pp. 635–643.
- "Nietzsche, An Evaluation." Journal of the History of Ideas 6 (1945): 285-293.
- "The Significance of the Unity of Science Movement." Philosophy and Phenomenological Research 6 (1946): 508-515.
- "Science and Discourse." Synthese 5 (1946): 296-308.
- "To the Editors of the Journal of Philosophy." Journal of Philosophy 43 (1946): 196.
- "To the Editors of the Journal of Philosophy." Journal of Philosophy 43 (1946): 363-364.
- "Linguistics and the Theory of Signs." Word 2 (1946): 85.
- "Philosophy as Symbolic Synthesis of Belief." Sixth Conference on Science, Philosophy, and Religion (1945). In Approaches to Group Understanding, ed. L. Bryson et al. (New York: 1947), pp. 626–631.
- "Testimony of American Youth." New York Herald Tribune, 26 October 1947.
- "Multiple Self and Multiple Society." In Freedom and Experience: Essays presented to H. M. Kallen, ed. Sidney Hook and Milton R. Konvitz (Ithaca: Cornell University Press, 1947), pp. 70–78.
- "Review of H. W. Schneider, A History of American Philosophy." Nation (1947): 225-226.
- "Signs about Signs about Signs." Philosophy and Phenomenological Research 9 (1948): 115-133. Reprinted in Charles Morris, Writings on the General Theory of Signs (The Hague: Mouton, 1971), pp. 434–455.
- "Comments on Mr. Storer's Paper." Philosophy of Science 15 (1948): 330-332.
- "Recent Studies in Meaning and Communication." Sigma 2 (1948): 454-458.
- "The Three Primary Forms of Discourse." In The Language of Wisdom and Folly, ed. I.J. Lee (New York: 1949), pp. 31–39.
- "Entrance to Asia." Chuo Koron (1949): 19-23.
- "Individual Differences and Cultural Patterns." In Personality in Nature, Society, and Culture, ed. C. Kluckhohn and H.A. Murray (New York: 1949), pp. 131–143.
- "Comments on the Paper by Jean A. Phillips." Philosophy of Science 17 (1950): 354-355.
- "Comparative Strength of Life-Ideals in Eastern and Western Cultures." In Essays in East-West Philosophy, ed. C.A. Moore (Honolulu: 1951), pp. 353–370.
- "Biosophical Themes and Human Values?" Biosophical Review 11 (1951): 16-18.
- "The Science of Man and Unified Science." Proceedings of the American Academy of Arts and Sciences 80 (1951): 37-44.
- "Similarity of Constitutional Factors in Psychotic Behavior in India, China and the United States." American Journal of Psychiatry 108 (1951): 143-144.
- "Axiology as the Science of Preferential Behavior." In Value: A Cooperative Inquiry, ed. R. Lepley (New York: 1951), pp. 211–222.
- "Comments on Mysticism and its Language." ETC. A Review of General Semantics 9 (1951–52): 3-8.
- "Review of K. Burke, A Rhetoric of Motives." Review of Metaphysics 4 (1951): 439-443.
- "Review of A. W. Watts, The Supreme Identity." Philosophy East and West 1 (1951): 77-79.
- "Significance, Signification, and Paintings." Methodos 5 (1953): 87-102. Reprinted in Symbols and Value, ed. L. Bryson (New York: 1954), pp. 563–575.
- "Symbols, Values and Philosophy." Audio recorded in 1953, 20 minutes. New York: McGraw-Hill, 1969. New York: Jeffrey Norton, 1981.
- "Review of R. B. Perry, Realms of Value." Annuals of the American Academy of Political and Social Sciences 295 (1954): 179-180.
- "Value Scales and Dimensions." Journal of Abnormal and Social Psychology 51 (1955): 523-535.
- "Toward a Unified Theory of Human Behavior." In Toward a Unified Theory of Human Behavior, ed. R.R. Grinker (New York: 1956), pp. 350–351.
- "Varieties of Human Value." Humanist 16 (1956): 153-161.
- "Return to Nature." Time (Atlantic edition) 67 (1956): 41.
- "Relations of Temperament to the Choice of Values." Journal of Abnormal and Social Psychology 53 (1956): 345-349.
- "Paintings, Ways to Live, and Values." In Sign Image Symbol, ed. G. Kepes (New York: 1956), pp. 144–149.
- "Man-Cosmos Symbols." In The New Landscape in Art and Science, ed. G. Kepes (Chicago: 1956), pp. 98–99. Reprinted in Charles Morris, Writings on the General Theory of Signs (The Hague: Mouton, 1971), pp. 464–466.
- "Review of L. Bryson et al., Symbols and Society." Contemporary Psychology 1 (1956): 216-217.
- "Review of P. Edwards, The Logic of Moral Discourse." Annuals of the American Academy of Political and Social Sciences 307 (1956): 181.
- "Review of S. Uyade, Logical Positivism: Essays in Philosophical Analysis and Language, Meaning and Value." Philosophy and Phenomenological Research 17 (1956–57): 265-266.
- "Mysticism and Its Language." In Language: An Enquiry into Its Meaning and Function, ed. R. N. Anshen (New York: 1957), pp. 179–187. Reprinted in Charles Morris, Writings on the General Theory of Signs (The Hague: Mouton, 1971), pp. 456–463.
- "A Comment on Dr. Paul Oppenheim's Dimension of Knowledge." Revue Internationale de Philosophie 40 (1957) Fasc. 2.
- "Philosophy and the Behavioral Sciences in the United States." Chinese Journal of Contemporary Philosophy and Social Sciences (1957): 1-8.
- "Review of K. R. Boulding, The Image: Knowledge in Life and Society." American Sociological Review 22 (1957): 112-113.
- "Review of H. Welch, The Parting of the Way: Lao Tzu and the Taoist Movement." American Sociological Review 22 (1957): 494.
- "Review of M. Natason, The Social Dynamics of George Herbert Mead." Ethics 67 (1957): 145-146.
- "Prospects for a New Synthesis: Science and the Humanities as Complementary Activities." In Science and the Modern Mind, ed. G. Holton (Boston: 1958).
- "Words without Meaning." Contemporary Psychology 3 (1958): 212-214.
- "Edward Scribner Ames As Philosopher." The Scroll: The Journal of the Campbell Institute (Chicago) 44 (1958): 7-10.
- "Philosophy, Psychiatry, Mental Illness and Health." Philosophy and Phenomenological Research 20 (1959–60): 47-55.
- "Values of Psychiatric Patients." Behavioral Science 5 (1960): 297-312.
- "On the History of the International Encyclopaedia of Unified Science." Synthese 12 (1960): 517-521.
- "Analysis of the Connotative Meanings of a Variety of Human Values as Expressed by American College Students." Journal of Abnormal and Social Psychology 62 (1961): 62-73.
- "Values, Problematic and Unproblematic, and Science." Journal of Communication 11 (1961): 205-210.
- "On the History of the International Encyclopedia of Unified Science." In Logic and Language: Festschrift R. Carnap (Dordrecht: 1962), pp. 242–246.
- "Pragmatism and Logical Empiricism." In The Philosophy of Rudolf Carnap, ed. Paul A. Schilpp (New York: 1963), pp. 87–98.
- "Otto Neurath and the Unity of Science Movement." Jerusalem: 1964.
- "George H. Mead: A Pragmatist's Philosophy of Science." In Scientific Psychology: Principles and Approaches, ed. Benjamin B. Wolman and Ernest Nagel (New York: Basic Books, 1965), pp. 402–408.
- "Aesthetics, Signs and Icons." Philosophy and Phenomenological Research 25 (1964–65): 356-364.
- "On the Unity of the Pragmatic Movement." Rice University Studies vol. 51 no. 4 (1965): 109-119.
- "Alfred Adler and George H. Mead." Journal of Individual Psychology 21 (1965): 199-200.
- "Technique and Human Value." Symposium on the Technological Society, the Center for the Study of Democratic Institutions, Santa Barbara, California, 19–23 December 1965.
- Festival. New York: George Braziller, 1966.
- "Comment on 'Counseling without Assuming Free Will'." Personnel and Guidance Journal 45 (1966): 217-218.
- "Foreword" to the Italian translation of "Esthetics and the Theory of Signs" and "Esthetics, Signs, and Icons." Nuova corrente 42-43 (1967): 113-119.
- "A Tribute to Daisetz Teitaro Suzuki." The Eastern Buddhist, new series 2 (1967): 128-129.
- "Religion and the Empirical Study of Human Values." Religious Humanism 1 (1967): 74-75.
- "Thirteen Ways to Live – A Report on Reactions of Readers of Religious Humanism." Religious Humanism 2 (1968): 85-86.
- "G. H. Mead als Sozialpsychologe und Sozialphilosoph." In George H. Mead, Geist, Identität und Gesellschaft (Frankfurt: Suhrkamp 1968), pp. 13–39.
- "The Symbol Maitreya." Maitreya 1 (1970): 4-6.
- "Changes in Conceptions of the Good Life by American Students from 1950 to 1970." Journal of Personality and Social Psychology 20 (1971): 254-260.
- "Sprechen und menschliches Handeln." In Philosophische Anthropologie, vol. 7, no. 2., ed. Hans Georg Gadamer and P. Vogler (Stuttgart: 1975), pp. 235–251.
