= Nikolay Milkov (philosopher) =

Bulgarian-German professor

Nikolay Milkov (Bulgarian Николай Милков; born October 20, 1953, Varna, Bulgaria) is a German-Bulgarian philosopher and professor (außerplanmäßiger Professor) at the Paderborn University.

== Biography ==
Nikolay Milkov studied philosophy at the University of Sofia from 1974 to 1978. In 1983, he defended the PhD thesis "Critical Analysis of the Philosophy of Logical Atomism" at the Lomonosov State University in Moscow, where he was a doctoral student. From August 1983, Milkov held a research position at the Institute for Philosophy of the Bulgarian Academy of Sciences. From October 1989, he was a research fellow at Bielefeld University, Germany, first as an Alexander von Humboldt fellow and later as a Fritz Thyssen fellow. For the Michaelmas and Lent Terms 1990/91, Milkov was also Visiting Philosopher at the Sub-Faculty of Philosophy, University of Oxford. In these years, he worked on the project on the history of analytical philosophy in England.

In 2005/06 Milkov was a Visiting Fellow at the Center for Philosophy of Science, University of Pittsburgh. Since 2007, he has been a philosophy lecturer at Paderborn University. In the first two years, he also worked on a research project on the Berlin Circle of logical empiricists around Hans Reichenbach, supported by the Fritz Thyssen Foundation. In 2009, Milkov received his venia legendi (habilitation) at Paderborn. In 2012, he accepted an invitation from McMaster University in Ontario, Canada, to be a Bertrand Russell Visiting Professor. Milkov has been a philosophy professor in Paderborn since 2015. In 2018, he was a visiting professor at Saint Petersburg State University, Russia.

== Work ==
Milkov started his work on the history of analytic philosophy, hoping to find a more refined method for achieving clear and correct thinking. A first result of this work was his dissertation on the logical atomism of Russell and Wittgenstein. Next Milkov translated Wittgenstein’s Tractatus logico-philosophicus, Philosophical Investigations and Remarks on the Foundations of Mathematics into Bulgarian.

Milkov’s next project was to write a comprehensive history of analytic philosophy in England. It has been published both in an expanded and in a condensed form. In the two books, Milkov presented all the works of G. E. Moore, Russell, Wittgenstein, John Wisdom, Gilbert Ryle, J. L. Austin, P. F. Strawson and Michael Dummett in a synoptic form which "maps out" the "logical geography" of their concepts and problems. Furthermore, Milkov tried to extract the specific method of the earlier analytic philosophy. In doing so, he presented the early analytic philosophers against a rich background of the history of philosophy, including ancient philosophy. In short, he defined the real task of earlier analytic philosophy as supporting the development of the facility for "correct thinking", which Aristotle defined as ὀρθός λόγος and Descartes as bona mens.

Milkov also explored the genealogical connections of earlier analytic philosophy with nineteenth-century German philosophy. While Gottlob Frege is usually seen as the ancestor of analytic philosophy, Milkov discovered Frege's professor in Göttingen, Hermann Lotze, as such. Importantly enough, Lotze decisively influenced both the emerging analytical philosophy and also Husserl's phenomenology.

To further clarify the correct method of philosophy, Milkov also related earlier analytic philosophy to the latest developments of science in historical perspective. To this end, he explored Hans Reichenbach's philosophy of nature and the Berlin group of logical empiricism Reichenbach led.

== Publications (books) ==
Author

- Kaleidoscopic Mind: An Essay in Post-Wittgensteinian Philosophy, Amsterdam: Rodopi, 1992.
- The Varieties of Understanding: English Philosophy since 1898, 2 vols., Frankfurt: Peter Lang, 1997.
- A Hundred Years of English Philosophy, Dordrecht: Kluwer, “Philosophical Studies” Series, vol. 94, 2003.
- The Philosophy of Logical Atomism (in Russian: Философия логического атомизма), Saint-Petersburg: “Nauka [Science]” Publishing House (of the Russian Academy of Sciences), 2018.
- Early Analytic Philosophy and the German Philosophical Tradition, London: Bloomsbury, 2020.
- Hermann Lotze's Influence on Twentieth Century Philosophy, Berlin-Boston: De Gruyter, "New Studies in the History and Historiography of Philosophy" Series, vol. 12, 2023. https://doi.org/10.1515/9783110726282
- The Tractatus, Wittgenstein’s Method and Analytic Philosophy, Basingstoke (Hampshire): Palgrave Macmillan, 2025. https://link.springer.com/book/9783032094414

Editor

- Zeko Torbov, Erinnerungen an Leonard Nelson: 1925–1927, Hildesheim: Georg Olms Verlag, "Studies and Materials on the History of Philosophy" Series, Volume 70, 2005.
- Hans Reichenbach, Ziele und Wege der heutigen Naturphilosophie, Hamburg: Felix Meiner, "Philosophical Library" series, volume 621, 2011.
- (with V. Peckhaus) The Berlin Group and the Philosophy of Logical Empiricism, Dordrecht: Springer, “Boston Studies in the Philosophy of Science” Series, no. 273, 2013.
- Die Berliner Gruppe, Hamburg: Felix Meiner, "Philosophical Library" series, volume 671, 2015.
- Hermann Lotze, Mikrokosmos, 3 volumes, Hamburg: Felix Meiner, "Philosophical Library" series, volumes 701a-c, 2017.
- Hermann Lotze, Medicinische Psychologie oder Physiologie der Seele, Heidelberg-Berlin: Springer Spectrum Verlag, "Classical Texts of Science" Series, 2021.
- (with Michele Vagnetti), The Philosophy of Rudolph Hermann Lotze: A Reassessment, London: Routledge,“Nineteenth-Century Philosophy” Series, 2026. https://www.routledge.com/The-Philosophy-of-Rudolph-Hermann-Lotze-A-Reassessment/Milkov-Vagnetti/p/book/9781032860732

Translator

- Wittgenstein, L., Tractatus Logico-Philosophicus (Bulgarian), Sofia: Nauka i Izkustvo, 1988.
- Wittgenstein, L., Philosophical Investigations (Bulgarian), Sofia: Nauka i Izkustvo, 1988.
- Wittgenstein, L., Remarks on the Foundations of Mathematics (Bulgarian), Sofia: Nauka i Izkustvo, 1988.
- Zeko Torbov, Erinnerungen an Leonard Nelson: 1925–1927 (German), Hildesheim: Georg Olms Verlag, "Studies and Materials on the History of Philosophy" Series, Volume 70, 2005.
