= Walter Dubislav =

German logician and philosopher of science

- Dubislav in 1931
- Born: September 20, 1895; Berlin, German Empire
- Died: September 17, 1937 (aged 41); Prague, Czechoslovakia
- Education: TH Charlottenburg
- Known for: Berlin Circle
- Spouse: Gertrud Troitsch (died 1935)
- Scientific career
- Fields: Logic, philosophy of science
- Thesis: Contributions to the theories of definition and proof within mathematical logic (1922)
- Doctoral advisor: Heinrich Maier

Walter Dubislav (German: [ˈduːbɪslaf]; 20 September 1895 – 17 September 1937) was a German logician and philosopher of science (Wissenschaftstheoretiker).

== Biography ==
After studying mathematics and philosophy, Dubislav attained a doctorate in 1922 with "Contributions to the theories of definition and proof within mathematical logic" (Beiträge zur Lehre von der Definition und vom Beweis vom Standpunkt der mathematischen Logik aus). In 1928 he became a private lecturer in philosophy of mathematics and the natural sciences at the TH Charlottenburg (today TU Berlin) and from 1931 was Professor Extraordinarius (außerordentlicher Professor, ao. Prof.). In 1936, he emigrated to Prague.

He was joint founder (with Hans Reichenbach and Kurt Grelling) of the Berlin Circle, which, along with the Vienna Circle, is one of the points of origin of logical empiricism. The founding members of the Berlin Circle were listed as sympathisers within the Vienna Circle.

Dubislav focused on a logical and mechanistic foundation of mathematics and physics, influenced by Bernard Bolzano's Theory of Science (Wissenschaftslehre). He presented a formalised account of Gottlob Frege's formal theory-construction.

== Publications ==
- With W. Clauberg: "A Systematic Dictionary of Philosophy" (Systematisches Wörterbuch der Philosophie). Felix Meiner, Leipzig 1923.
- "On Definitions" (Über die Definition). Weiss, Berlin 1926; 2nd edition published 1927; "Definition" (Die Definition), revised and augmented 3rd edition, Felix Meiner, Leipzig 1931; 4th edition, with an introduction by Wilhelm K. Essler, published by Meiner, Hamburg 1981 ISBN 3-7873-0513-0.
- "On the so-called analytic and synthetic judgements" (Über die sogennanten analytischen und synthetischen Urteile). Weiss, Berlin 1926.
- "Fries' Theory of Meaning" (Die Friessche Lehre von der Begründung) in "Representation and Criticism" (Darstellung und Kritik), E. Mattig, Dömitz 1926.
- "On the Theory of the so-called Creative Definitions" (Zur Lehre von den sog. schöpferischen Definitionen). Fulda 1928.
- "On the so-called Object in Mathematics" (Über den sogenannten Gegenstand in der Mathematik) in "The Annual Report of the German Mathematics Convention, 37" (Jahresbericht der Deutschen Mathematiker-Vereinigung 37), pp27–48, Leipzig 1928.
- "On the Methodology of Critical Philosophy" (Zur Methodenlehre des Kritizismus). H. Beyer & Sons, Langensalza 1929.
- "Contemporary Philosophy of Mathematics" (Die Philosophie der Mathematik in der Gegenwart). (Philosophische Forschungsberichte 13) Junker & Dünnhaupt, Berlin 1932.
- "Philosophy of Nature" (Naturphilosophie). (Philosophische Grundrisse Heft 2) Junker & Dünnhaupt, Berlin 1933; also in ISBN 3-8364-1795-2
