= Grelling =

Grelling is a surname. Notable people with the surname include:

- Kurt Grelling (1886–1942), German logician and philosopher
- Richard Grelling (1853−1929), German lawyer, writer, and pacifist
