= Vladimir Kanovei =

Russian mathematician

Vladimir G. Kanovei
- Born: 1951 (age 73–74); Russia
- Known for: Nonstandard analysis, Borel equivalence relations, descriptive set theory
- Notable work: Nonstandard Analysis, Axiomatically (2004); Borel Equivalence Relations (2008); Tools, Objects, and Chimeras (2013)
- Scientific career
- Fields: Mathematical logic, foundations of mathematics, mathematical history
- Institutions: Institute for Information Transmission Problems, Moscow

Vladimir G. Kanovei (born 1951) is a Russian mathematician working at the Institute for Information Transmission Problems in Moscow, Russia. His interests include mathematical logic and foundations, as well as mathematical history.

== Selected publications ==
- Kanovei, Vladimir; Katz, Mikhail G.; Mormann, Thomas (2013), "Tools, Objects, and Chimeras: Connes on the Role of Hyperreals in Mathematics", Foundations of Science, 18 (2): 259–296, arXiv:1211.0244, doi:10.1007/s10699-012-9316-5, S2CID 254515019.
- Kanovei, Vladimir; Reeken, Michael; Nonstandard analysis, axiomatically. Springer Monographs in Mathematics. Springer-Verlag, Berlin, 2004. xvi+408 pp. ISBN 3-540-22243-X
- Kanovei, Vladimir; Borel equivalence relations. Structure and classification. University Lecture Series, 44. American Mathematical Society, Providence, RI, 2008. x+240 pp. ISBN 978-0-8218-4453-3
- Kanoveĭ, V.; Reeken, M.; On Ulam's problem concerning the stability of approximate homomorphisms. (Russian) Tr. Mat. Inst. Steklova 231 (2000), Din. Sist., Avtom. i Beskon. Gruppy, 249–283; translation in Proc. Steklov Inst. Math. 2000, no. 4 (231), 238–270
- Kanoveĭ, V. G.; Lyubetskiĭ, V. A.; On some classical problems in descriptive set theory. (Russian) Uspekhi Mat. Nauk 58 (2003), no. 5(353), 3--88; translation in Russian Math. Surveys 58 (2003), no. 5, 839–927
- Kanoveĭ, V. G.; Reeken, M.; Some new results on the Borel irreducibility of equivalence relations. (Russian) Izv. Ross. Akad. Nauk Ser. Mat. 67 (2003), no. 1, 59–82; translation in Izv. Math. 67 (2003), no. 1, 55–76 03E15 (54H05)
- Kanovei, Vladimir; Reeken, Michael; Mathematics in a nonstandard world. II. Math. Japon. 45 (1997), no. 3, 555–571.
- Kanovei, Vladimir; On non-wellfounded iterations of the perfect set forcing. Journal of Symbolic Logic 64 (1999), no. 2, 551–574.
- Kanovei, Vladimir; Shelah, Saharon; A definable nonstandard model of the reals. Journal of Symbolic Logic 69 (2004), no. 1, 159–164.
- Kanovei, Vladimir; Reeken, Michael. Internal approach to external sets and universes. I. Bounded set theory. Studia Logica 55 (1995), no. 2, 229–257.
- Kanovei, Vladimir; Reeken, Michael. Internal approach to external sets and universes. II. External universes over the universe of bounded set theory. Studia Logica 55 (1995), no. 3, 347–376.
- Kanovei, Vladimir; Reeken, Michael. Internal approach to external sets and universes. III. Partially saturated universes. Studia Logica 56 (1996), no. 3, 293–322.

This series of three papers was reviewed by Karel Hrbacek here.
