= Autological word =

Word that expresses a property it also possesses

An autological word (or homological word) expresses a property that it also possesses. For example, the word "word" is a word, the word "English" is (in) English, the word "writable" is writable, and the word "pentasyllabic" has five syllables.

The opposite, a heterological word, does not have the property it names. For example, the word "palindrome" is not a palindrome, "unwritable" is writable, and "monosyllabic" has more than one syllable.

These terms were coined by Kurt Grelling and Leonard Nelson in order to discuss a semantic paradox, akin to Russell's paradox: classifying the word "heterological" as either autological or heterological leads to a logical contradiction. This is now known as the Grelling–Nelson paradox.

== See also ==
- Aptronym
- Self-reference
- Appendix:English autological terms on Wiktionary
