= Fernau =

Fernau is a surname. Notable people with the surname include:

- Hermann Fernau (born 1883/84), German lawyer, writer, journalist and pacifist
- Rudolf Fernau (1898–1985), German actor
