= Philosophy of Natural Science =

1966 book by Carl Gustav Hempel

- Cover of the paperback edition
- Author: Carl Gustav Hempel
- Language: English
- Subject: Philosophy of science
- Published: 1966
- Publication place: United States
- Media type: Print (Hardcover and Paperback)
- Pages: 116
- ISBN: 978-0136638230

Philosophy of Natural Science is a 1966 book about the philosophy of science by the philosopher Carl Gustav Hempel.

== Reception ==
The philosopher Michael Friedman wrote that while Philosophy of Natural Science was more popular in its approach to the philosophy of science than Hempel's Aspects of Scientific Explanation (1965), it was extremely influential.

== See also ==
- Natural science
