= Hempel's dilemma =

Philosophical question

Hempel's dilemma is a question first asked (at least on record) by the philosopher Carl Hempel in 1969. It has relevance to naturalism and physicalism in philosophy, and to philosophy of mind.

The dilemma questions how the language of physics can be used to accurately describe existence, given that it relies on imperfect human linguistics, or as Hempel stated: "The thesis of physicalism would seem to require a language in which a true theory of all physical phenomena can be formulated. But it is quite unclear what is to be understood here by a physical phenomenon, especially in the context of a doctrine that has taken a determinedly linguistic turn."

== Overview ==
Physicalism, in at least one general sense, is the claim that the entire world may be described and explained using the laws of nature, in other words, that all phenomena are natural phenomena. This leaves open the question of what is 'natural' (in physicalism 'natural' means procedural, causally coherent or all effects have particular causes regardless of human knowledge [like physics] and interpretation and it also means 'ontological reality' and not just a hypothesis or a calculational technique), but one common understanding of the claim is that everything in the world is ultimately explicable in the terms of physics. This is known as reductive physicalism. However, this type of physicalism in its turn leaves open the question of what we are to consider as the proper terms of physics. There seem to be two options here, and these options form the horns of Hempel's dilemma, because neither seems satisfactory.

On the one hand, we may define the physical as whatever is currently explained by our best physical theories, e.g., quantum mechanics, general relativity. Though many would find this definition unsatisfactory, some would accept that we have at least a general understanding of the physical based on these theories, and can use them to assess what is physical and what is not. And therein lies the rub, as a worked-out explanation of mentality currently lies outside the scope of such theories.

On the other hand, if we say that some future, "ideal" physics is what is meant, then the claim is rather empty, for we have no idea of what this means. The "ideal" physics may even come to define what we think of as mental as part of the physical world. In effect, physicalism by this second account becomes the circular claim that all phenomena are explicable in terms of physics because physics properly defined is whatever explains all phenomena.

Beenakker has proposed to resolve Hempel's dilemma with the definition: "The boundary between physics and metaphysics is the boundary between what can and what cannot be computed in the age of the universe".

Hempel's dilemma is relevant to philosophy of mind because explanations of issues such as consciousness, representation, and intentionality are very hard to come by using current physics, although many people in philosophy (and other fields such as cognitive science, psychology, and neuroscience) hold to physicalism.
