= Hermann Fernau =

German lawyer, writer, and pacifist (born 1883 or 1884)

Hermann Fernau (born 1883 or 1884) was a German lawyer, writer, journalist and pacifist.

== Biography ==
Fernau was born in Breslau (now called Wrocław), in the Prussian Province of Silesia. From 1905 he lived as a writer and journalist in Paris - he was a passionate pacifist and a Francophile. When war broke out in 1914 he was convinced that Germany was guilty of provoking the war. However, in May of the following year he was deported to Switzerland. In May 1916 he settled in Basel, where he joined the German-exile pacifist community. In his books and newspaper articles he opposed the war and called for an end to the German monarchy. He was accused by the German authorities of writing the book J'Accuse, condemning the actions of the German Empire, which in fact had been written by his fellow pacifist Richard Grelling.

== Selected works ==
- Gustave Hervé: Elsaß-Lothringen und die deutsch-französische Verständigung. Translated by and with a forward from Hermann Fernau. Duncker & Humblot, Munich, Leipzig 1913
- Die französische Demokratie, sozialpolitische Studien aus Frankreichs Kulturwerkstatt. Duncker & Humblot, Munich, Leipzig 1914 Digitalisat
- Gerade weil ich Deutscher bin! Eine Klarstellung der in dem Buche „J'accuse“ aufgerollten Schuldfrage. Orell Füßli, Zürich 1916
  - Because I am a German. Edited with an introduction by T.W. Rolleston. Constable, London 1916 Digitalisat

== See also ==
- List of peace activists
