= Apodicticity =

Propositions that are demonstrably, necessarily or self-evidently true

"Apodictic", also spelled "apodeictic" (Ancient Greek: ἀποδεικτικός, "capable of demonstration"), is an adjectival expression from Aristotelian logic that refers to propositions that are demonstrably, necessarily or self-evidently true. Apodicticity or apodixis is the corresponding abstract noun, referring to logical certainty.

Apodictic propositions contrast with assertoric propositions, which merely assert that something is (or is not) true, and with problematic propositions, which assert only the possibility of something's being true. Apodictic judgments are clearly provable or logically certain. For instance, "Three plus one equals four" is apodictic, because it is true by definition. "Chicago is larger than Omaha" is assertoric. "A corporation could be wealthier than a country" is problematic. In Aristotelian logic, "apodictic" is opposed to "dialectic", as scientific proof is opposed to philosophical reasoning. Kant contrasted "apodictic" with "problematic" and "assertoric" in the Critique of Pure Reason (A70/B95 - A76/B101).

== Apodictic a priorism ==
Hans Reichenbach, one of the founders of logical positivism, offered a modified version of Immanuel Kant's a priorism by distinguishing between apodictic a priorism and constitutive a priorism.

== See also ==
- Apophantic – Specific type of declaratory statement
