= Morton Masius =

German-American physical chemist

Morton Masius (October 6, 1883, Egg Harbor City, New Jersey – November 1, 1979, New Haven, Connecticut) was a German-American physical chemist. He was elected a Fellow of the American Physical Society in 1928.

== Biography ==
His parents were Alfred Masius, a translator for the U.S. Department of Agriculture, and his wife Edith, née Bailey. Morton Massius's paternal grandfather was Hermann Masius, a professor of pedagogy. Morton Masius attended the humanistic St. Thomas School, Leipzig. After completing his Abitur, he studied physical chemistry at the Leipzig University and received in 1908 his Dr. rer. nat. (Ph.D.) with a dissertation supervised by Herbert Max Finlay Freundlich. In 1910 in Leipzig, Morton Masius married Paula Marie Wagner, daughter of a wealthy Leipzig family. They had two daughters, Marguerite (1917–2008) and Vera Mildred (1919–2006).

From 1908 to 1909 he was a Whiting Postdoctoral Fellow at Harvard University. In 1909 he became a faculty member in the physics department of Worcester Polytechnic Institute (WPI), where he was promoted in 1919 to full professor. Later he became head of the physics department. He retired as professor emeritus in 1954. He is perhaps best known for his 1914 translation of the 1913 2nd edition of Max Planck's 1906 Vorlesungen über die Theorie der Wärmestrahlung.

Masius was a member of the American Association of Physics Teachers and the Society for Freedom in Science. His grave is in Worcester Rural Cemetery.

== Selected publications ==
- Über die Adsorption in Gemischen. Noske, Leipzig 1908. (Massius's dissertation, Universität Leipzig)
- Problems in General Physics for College Courses. P. Blakiston's Son and Co., Philadelphia 1917.
- College Physics. Longmans, Green and Co., New York 1941; as co-author with Alexander Wilmer Duff (1864–1955)

as translator:

- Max Planck: The Theory of Heat Radiation. P. Blakiston's Son and Co, Philadelphia 1914, with 7 illustrations. (translated into English from Vorlesungen über die Theorie der Wärmestrahlung).
- Louis Rougier: Philosophy and the New Physics. An Essay on the Relativity Theory and the Theory of Quanta, P. Blakiston's Son and Co, Philadelphia 1921. (translated into English from La matérialisation de l'énergie: essai sur la théorie de la relativité et sur la théorie des quanta)
