= Grelling–Nelson paradox =

Semantic self-referential paradox

The Grelling–Nelson paradox arises from the question of whether the term non-self-descriptive is self-descriptive. It was formulated in 1908 by Kurt Grelling and Leonard Nelson, and is sometimes mistakenly attributed to the German philosopher and mathematician Hermann Weyl thus occasionally called Weyl's paradox or Grelling's paradox. It is closely related to several other well-known paradoxes, in particular, the barber paradox and Russell's paradox. It is an antinomy, or a semantic self-referential paradox.

== Paradox ==
The first instance of the word blue is autological, while the second is heterological.

Suppose one interprets the adjectives autological and heterological as follows:

1. An adjective is autological (sometimes homological) if it describes itself. For example, the English word English is autological, as are unhyphenated (which has no hyphens) and pentasyllabic (which has 5 syllables).
2. An adjective is heterological if it does not describe itself. Hence long is a heterological word (because it is not a long word), as are hyphenated (because it has no hyphen) and monosyllabic (because it has more than one syllable).

All adjectives, it would seem, must be either autological or heterological, for each adjective either describes itself, or it does not. Problems arise in a number of instances, however.

=== Paradoxical cases ===
The Grelling–Nelson paradox arises when one considers the adjective heterological. One can ask: Is heterological a heterological word? If the answer is "no", then heterological is autological. This leads to a contradiction, for in this case heterological does not describe itself: it must be a heterological word. But if the answer is "yes", then heterological is heterological. This again leads to a contradiction, because if the word heterological describes itself, it is autological.

- Is heterological a heterological word?
  - no → heterological is autological → heterological describes itself → heterological is heterological, contradiction
  - yes → heterological is heterological → heterological does not describe itself → heterological is not heterological, contradiction

The paradox can be eliminated, without changing the meaning of heterological where it was previously well-defined, by modifying the definition of heterological slightly to hold all nonautological words except heterological. But nonautological is subject to the same paradox, for which this evasion is not applicable because the rules of English uniquely determine its meaning from that of autological. A similar slight modification to the definition of autological (such as declaring it false of nonautological and its synonyms) might seem to correct that, but the paradox still remains for synonyms of autological and heterological such as self-descriptive and non-self-descriptive, whose meanings also would need adjusting, and the consequences of those adjustments would then need to be pursued, and so on. Freeing English of the Grelling–Nelson paradox entails considerably more modification to the language than mere refinements of the definitions of autological and heterological, which need not even be in the language for the paradox to arise. The scope of these obstacles for English is comparable to that of Russell's paradox for mathematics founded on sets.

=== Arbitrary cases ===
One may also ask whether autological is autological. It can be chosen consistently to be either:

- if one concludes that autological is autological and then asks whether it applies to itself, then yes, it does, and thus is autological;
- if one concludes, however, that autological is not autological and then asks whether it applies to itself, then no, it does not, and thus is not autological.

This is the opposite of the situation for heterological: while heterological logically cannot be autological or heterological, autological can be either. (It cannot be both, as the category of autological and heterological cannot overlap.)

In logical terms, the situation for autological is:

autological is autological if and only if autological is autological
A if and only if A, a tautology

while the situation for heterological is:

heterological is heterological if and only if heterological is autological
A if and only if not A, a contradiction.

=== Ambiguous cases ===
One may also ask whether loud is autological or heterological. If said loudly, loud is autological; otherwise, it is heterological. This shows that some adjectives cannot be unambiguously classified as autological or heterological. Newhard sought to eliminate this problem by taking Grelling's Paradox to deal specifically with word types as opposed to word tokens.

== Similarities with Russell's paradox ==
The Grelling–Nelson paradox can be translated into Russell's paradox in the following way. First, one must identify each adjective with the set of objects to which that adjective applies. So, for example, the adjective red is equated with the set of all red objects. In this way, the adjective pronounceable is equated with the set of all pronounceable things, one of which is the word pronounceable itself. Thus, an autological word is understood as a set, one of whose elements may be the set itself. The question of whether the word heterological is heterological becomes the question of whether the set of all sets which do not contain themselves contains itself.

== See also ==
- Self-reference
- List of self–referential paradoxes
- Metamagical Themas
- Use–mention distinction
