= Assertoricity =

Concept in Aristotelian logic

Assertoric is an adjectival expression in Aristotelian logic that refers to propositions which merely assert that something is (or is not) the case. Assertoricity is the corresponding abstract noun.

Assertoric propositions contrast with problematic propositions which assert the possibility of something being true, and apodeictic propositions which assert things which are necessarily or self-evidently true or false. For instance, "Chicago is larger than Omaha" is assertoric. "A corporation could be wealthier than a country" is problematic. "Two plus two equals four" is apodeictic.
