= Aspects of Scientific Explanation =

1965 book by Carl Gustav Hempel

Aspects of Scientific Explanation and other Essays in the Philosophy of Science
- Cover of the first edition
- Author: Carl Gustav Hempel
- Language: English
- Subject: Philosophy of science
- Published: 1965
- Publication place: United States
- Media type: Print (Hardcover and Paperback)
- Pages: 504
- ISBN: 978-0029143407

Aspects of Scientific Explanation and other Essays in the Philosophy of Science is a 1965 book by the philosopher Carl Gustav Hempel. It is regarded as one of the most important works in the philosophy of science written after World War II.

== Reception ==
The historian Peter Gay wrote that Aspects of Scientific Explanation was "seminal" and "indispensable", writing that Hempel persuasively argued that "the logic of history and that of the natural sciences are the same." Gay observed that Hempel's essay "The Function of General Laws in History" is a "much debated classic". The philosopher Michael Friedman described the book as one of the most important works in philosophy of science written after World War II.

== See also ==
- Models of scientific inquiry
