= Berlin Circle =

Former group of philosophers and scientists

The Berlin Circle (German: Berliner Gruppe) was a group that maintained logical empiricist views about philosophy.

== History ==
The "Berlin Circle" had its roots in seminars by Hans Reichenbach between 1926 and 1928, resulting in the formation of a group that included Reichenbach, Kurt Grelling and Walter Dubislav among others. Independently, the Machist philosopher Joseph Petzoldt and others founded the local Berlin group (German: Berliner Ortsgruppe) of the International Society for Empirical Philosophy (German: Internationale Gesellschaft für empirische Philosophie), which was subsequently joined by the members of Reichenbach's group as well. The society was renamed in 1928 as Berlin Society for Empirical Philosophy (German: Berliner Gesellschaft für empirische Philosophie), and after Petzoldt's death in 1929, the society was essentially taken over by Reichenbach's group, who in 1931 rebranded it as Berlin Society for Scientific Philosophy (German: Berliner Gesellschaft für wissenschaftliche Philosophie).

Additional members of the group include philosophers and scientists such as Carl Gustav Hempel, David Hilbert and Richard von Mises. Together with the Vienna Circle, they published the journal Erkenntnis ("Knowledge") edited by Rudolf Carnap and Reichenbach, and organized several congresses and colloquia concerning the philosophy of science, the first of which was held in Prague in 1929.

The Berlin Circle had much in common with the Vienna Circle, but the philosophies of the circles differed on a few subjects, such as probability and conventionalism. Reichenbach insisted on calling his philosophy logical empiricism, to distinguish it from the logical positivism of the Vienna Circle. Few people today make the distinction, and the words are often used interchangeably. Members of the Berlin Circle were particularly active in analyzing the philosophical and logical consequences of the advances in contemporary physics, especially the theory of relativity. Apart from that, they denied the soundness of metaphysics and traditional philosophy and asserted that many philosophical problems are indeed meaningless. After the rise of Nazism, several of the group's members emigrated to other countries, including Reichenbach, who moved to Turkey in 1933 and later to the United States in 1938; Dubislav emigrated to Prague in 1936; Hempel moved to Belgium in 1934 and later to the United States in 1939; and Grelling was killed in a concentration camp. A younger member of the Berlin Circle or Berlin School to leave Germany was Olaf Helmer, who joined the RAND Corporation and played an important role in the development of the Delphi method used for predicting future trends, and other early forms of social technology.

After many members emigrated or were forced into exile, the Vienna Circle and the Berlin Circle effectively ceased to function as groups, but logical empiricism continued to influence analytic philosophy, particularly the philosophy of science and philosophical methodology.
