= Thomas Mormann =

Spanish philosopher and university teacher

Thomas Mormann (born 1951) is Professor of Philosophy at the University of the Basque Country in San Sebastián, Spain. He obtained his PhD in mathematics from the Technical University of Dortmund (1978). He obtained his Habilitation from LMU Munich. He works in the philosophy of science, formal ontology, structuralism, Carnap studies, and neo-Kantianism.

== Selected publications ==
- Mormann, T.; Katz, M. (2013). "Infinitesimals as an Issue of Neo-Kantian Philosophy of Science". HOPOS: The Journal of the International Society for the History of Philosophy of Science. 3 (2). HOPOS: 236–280. arXiv:1304.1027. doi:10.1086/671348. JSTOR 10.1086/671348. S2CID 119128707.
- Mormann, T. Continuous lattices and Whiteheadian theory of space. The Second German-Polish Workshop on Logic & Logical Philosophy (Żagań, 1998). Logic and Log. Philos. No. 6 (1998), 35–54.
- W. Diederich, A. Ibarra, T. Mormann. Bibliography of structuralism. Erkenntnis, 1989, Springer.
- T. Mormann. Rudolf Carnap. Munich, Beck, 2000.
- T. Mormann. Ist der Begriff der Repräsentation obsolete? Zeitschrift für philosophische Forschung, 1997.
- J. Echeverría, A. Ibarra, T. Mormann. The Space of Mathematics: Philosophical, Epistemological and Historical Explorations. 1992.
