= Kant-Studien =

- Discipline: Philosophy
- Language: English; German

Publication details
- History: 1897–present

Standard abbreviations
- ISO 4: Kant-Stud.

Indexing
- ISSN: 0022-8877

Kant-Studien ("Kant Studies") is a quarterly journal of philosophy, focusing on Immanuel Kant. The journal was established in 1897. It publishes articles in English and German.

Over the decades the editorial board of Kant-Studien has included such internationally noted Kantian scholars as Gottfried Martin at the University of Bonn in Germany (1953-1965) and Lewis White Beck at the University of Rochester in the United States.

== See also ==
- List of philosophy journals
