= Kurt Grelling =

German logician and philosopher (1886–1942)

- Kurt Grelling at work in his study c. 1934
- Born: 2 March 1886; Berlin, German Empire
- Died: September 1942; Auschwitz-Birkenau, German-occupied Poland

Education
- Education: University of Göttingen (PhD, 1910)
- Thesis: Die Axiome der Arithmetik mit besonderer Berücksichtigung der Beziehungen zur Mengenlehre (The Axioms of Arithmetic with Particular Regard to their Relation to Set Theory) (1910)
- Doctoral advisor: David Hilbert

Philosophical work
- Era: 20th-century philosophy
- Region: Western philosophy
- School: Analytic philosophy Berlin Circle
- Main interests: Philosophy of science, logic, axiomatic set theory
- Notable ideas: Grelling–Nelson paradox

Kurt Grelling (German: [ˈɡʁɛlɪŋ]; 2 March 1886 – September 1942) was a German logician and philosopher, member of the Berlin Circle.

== Life and work ==
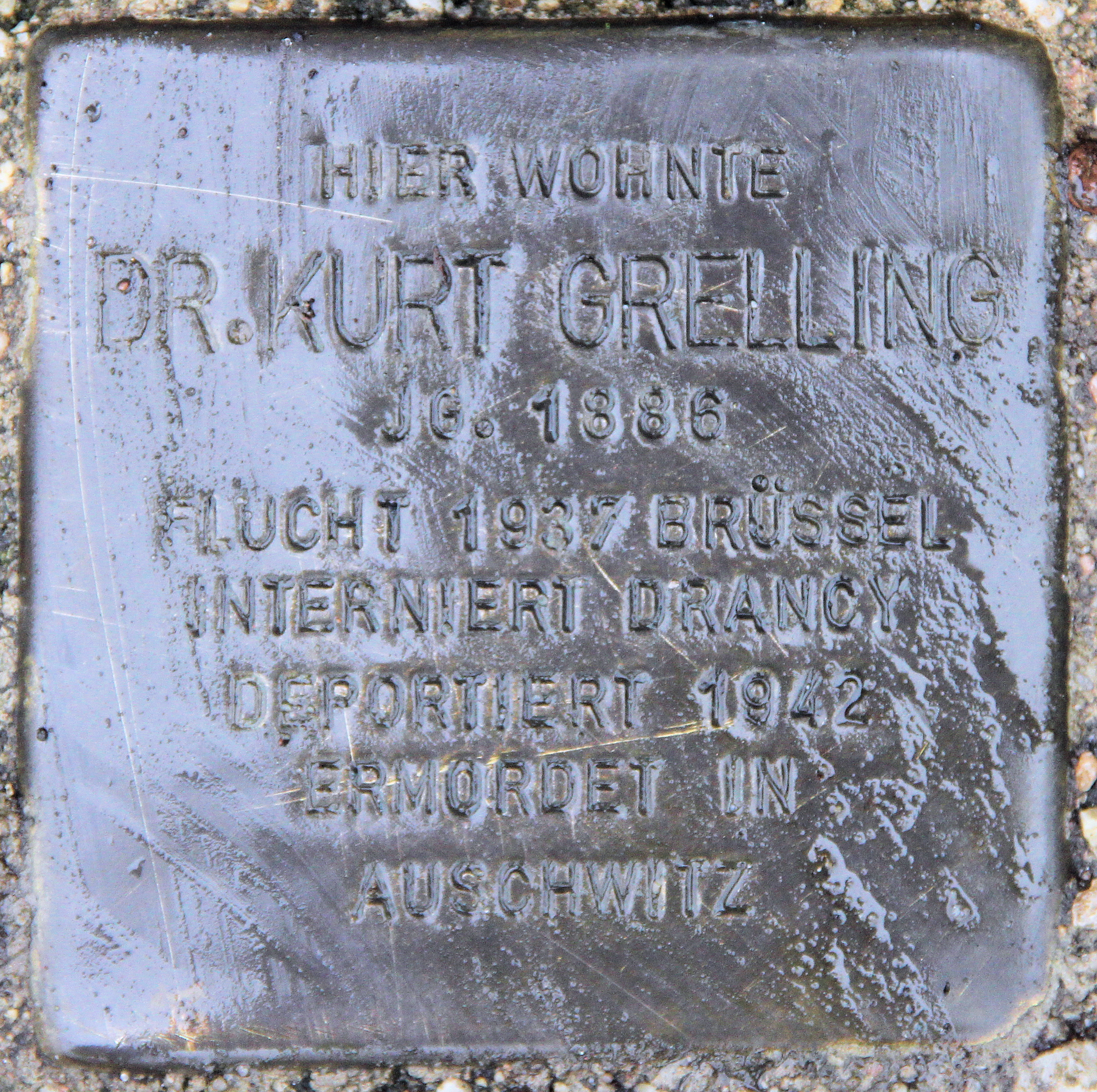
Memorial Stolperstein at Kurt Grelling's residence Königsberger Straße 13 in Berlin

Kurt Grelling was born on 2 March 1886 in Berlin. His father, the Doctor of Jurisprudence Richard Grelling, and his mother, Margarethe (née Simon), were Jewish. Shortly after his arrival in 1905 at University of Göttingen, Grelling began a collaboration with philosopher Leonard Nelson, with whom he tried to solve Russell's paradox, which had shaken the foundations of mathematics when it was announced in 1903. Their 1908 paper included new paradoxes, including a semantic paradox that was named the Grelling–Nelson paradox.

He received his doctorate in mathematics from the same university in 1910 with a PhD dissertation on the development of arithmetic in axiomatic set theory, advised by David Hilbert. In a recorded interview with Herbert Enderton, Alfred Tarski mentions a meeting he had with Grelling in 1938, and says that Grelling was the author of the earliest textbook in set theory, probably but wrongly referring to this dissertation, since William Henry Young and Grace Chisholm Young's Set Theory was published in 1906.

As a skilled linguist, Grelling translated philosophical works from French, Italian and English to German, including four of Bertrand Russell's works. He became a strong proponent of Russell's writings thereafter.

From 1911 to 1922 Grelling published exclusively journalistic articles in publications connected with the Social Democratic Party of Germany.

In 1915 his father, Richard Grelling, wrote the anti-war book J'Accuse, condemning the actions of the Central Powers. It enjoyed huge sales outside Germany. Richard followed this success up with Das Verbrechen (The Crime), in which he attacked his critics, who included Kurt Grelling.

From 1924 onwards Grelling's publications were exclusively in the field of positivist philosophy.

Unable to find a university position in either Göttingen or Berlin, Grelling had to teach mathematics, philosophy and physics in secondary schools. Nevertheless, he worked with Hans Reichenbach in planning the meetings of the Berlin Circle, which was closely associated with the Vienna Circle. In 1933, Reichenbach emigrated to Turkey and the Nazis forced Grelling to retire. But he struggled to keep the Berlin Circle active by organizing small seminars and colloquia.

Grelling collaborated with Kurt Gödel and in 1937 he published an article in which he defended Gödel's first incompleteness theorem against an erroneous interpretation, according to which Gödel's theorem is a paradox as Russell's paradox.

Although many of his relatives and friends had fled Germany, he did not think seriously about leaving until 1937, in which year he went to Brussels to work with Paul Oppenheim, this time writing several papers on the analysis of scientific explanation and on Gestalt psychology.

On 10 May 1940, the first day of the German invasion in Belgium, Grelling was arrested. He was deported to southern France, where he was interned for over two years under the Vichy regime. Oppenheim and Hempel tried to help Grelling by securing an appointment for him at the New School for Social Research in New York City. News of the position and a visa to the United States reached the camp where Grelling had been joined by his wife Greta, who had refused to divorce him for safety reasons. But U.S. immigration officials were perplexed by Grelling's alleged propensity towards communism, so there was a delay that was fatal to Grelling. He and his wife were shipped to Auschwitz, arriving there on September 18, 1942 and were murdered in the gas chambers soon after arrival.

== Selected publications ==
- Grelling, K.; Nelson, L. (1908). "Bemerkungen zu den Paradoxien von Russell und Burali-Forti". Abhandlungen der Fries'schen Schule II. Göttingen: W. Engelmann. pp. 301–334.
- Die Axiome der Arithmetik mit besonderer Berücksichtigung der Beziehungen zur Mengenlehre. PhD dissertation, Göttingen University Press, 1910.
- Anti-J'accuse. Eine deutsche Antwort. Zürich: Art. Institut Orell Füssli, 1916.
- "Gibt es eine Gödelsche Antinomie?", in: Theoria 3 (1937):297–306.
