= Richard Grelling =

German lawyer, writer and pacifist (1853–1929)

Richard Grelling (11 June 1853 − 14 January 1929) was a German lawyer, writer and pacifist who wrote the international best selling book J'Accuse in World War I, publicly criticizing the actions of Germany for waging a war of aggression in Europe.

== Early life ==
Richard Grelling was born in Berlin, at that time the capital of Prussia. He studied law but after finishing his studies worked as a writer and dramatist.

In 1892 he was a founder-member of the German Peace Society (German: Deutsche Friedensgesellschaft), of which he was vice-chairman. From 1903 he lived near Florence, until Italy joined the belligerents in 1915, after which he moved to Switzerland.

== World War I ==
In 1915 Grelling wrote the anti-war book entitled J'Accuse, condemning the actions of Germany in causing the war through its foreign policies. The book was banned in Germany but was translated into many languages and enjoyed huge sales. Printed excerpts in the form of propaganda leaflets from its text were dropped by aircraft of the British Expeditionary Force into the Imperial German Army's trenches in France before the Battle of the Somme in 1916 in an endeavour to undermine the fighting morale of the German troops situated there.

He followed this success of J'Accuse with Das Verbrechen (The Crime), in which he attacked his critics, including his son, the philosopher Kurt Grelling.

== Later life ==
He later worked for several newspapers, among them the Frankfurter Zeitung. During the Weimar Republic most of his writings were boycotted.

Grelling died in Berlin.

== See also ==
- List of peace activists
