= Rudolf Carnap =

German-American philosopher (1891–1970)

- Carnap in 1930
- Born: Paul Rudolf Carnap; 18 May 1891; Ronsdorf, Lennep, Düsseldorf, Rhine, Prussia, German Empire
- Died: 14 September 1970 (aged 79); Santa Monica, California, U.S.
- Political party: USPD (1918 – early 1920s)

Education
- Education: University of Jena (B.A., 1914; Ph.D., 1921); University of Freiburg (audit student, 1911–12); University of Berlin (graduate research, 1917–18); University of Vienna (Dr. phil. hab., 1926)
- Theses: Der Raum: Ein Beitrag zur Wissenschaftslehre (Space: A Contribution to the Theory of Science) (1921); Der logische Aufbau der Welt (The Logical Structure of the World) (1926)
- Doctoral advisor: Bruno Bauch (Ph.D. advisor); Moritz Schlick (Dr. phil. hab.)
- Other advisors: Karl Baedeker; Gottlob Frege; Heinrich Rickert

Philosophical work
- Era: 20th-century philosophy
- Region: Western philosophy
- School: Analytic; Vienna Circle; Logical positivism Logical atomism Logical behaviorism Formalism; Nominalism
- Institutions: University of Vienna; German University in Prague; University of Chicago; Harvard University; Institute for Advanced Study; UCLA
- Doctoral students: David Kaplan; Abner Shimony
- Notable students: Yehoshua Bar-Hillel; Carl Gustav Hempel; Peter G. Ossorio; W. V. O. Quine; Rose Rand; Richard Rorty; Herbert A. Simon; Raymond Smullyan
- Main interests: Logic · Epistemology; Philosophy of science Semantics
- Notable ideas: List: Physicalism Phenomenalism in linguistic terms Logical behaviorism Extensionalism Analytic–synthetic distinction (revised) Internal–external distinction Confirmationism Constitution theory Semantics for modal logic Inductive logic Constructed systems Conceptual schemes Formal epistemology Framework-relative constitutive a priori Intension and extension Functor Beobachtungssatz (observational statement) Elementarerlebnisse (elementary experiences) Carnap's categoricity (Monomorphie) problem Forkability theorem (Gabelbarkeitssatz): "every complete axiom system is also categorical (monomorph)" Logical positivism Epistemic structural realism L-true (logically true) statements Intensional semantics evaluating formulas in state-descriptions Carnap sentences Three kinds of space: formal, physical and perceptual Elimination of metaphysics through logical analysis Omega-rule General self-referential lemma Carnapian (concept) explication Principle of tolerance Compatibilism

Paul Rudolf Carnap (/ˈkɑːrnæp/; German: [ˈkaʁnaːp]; 18 May 1891 – 14 September 1970) was a German philosopher and logician who was active in Europe before 1935 and in the United States thereafter. He was a major member of the Vienna Circle and an advocate of logical positivism.

== Early life and education ==
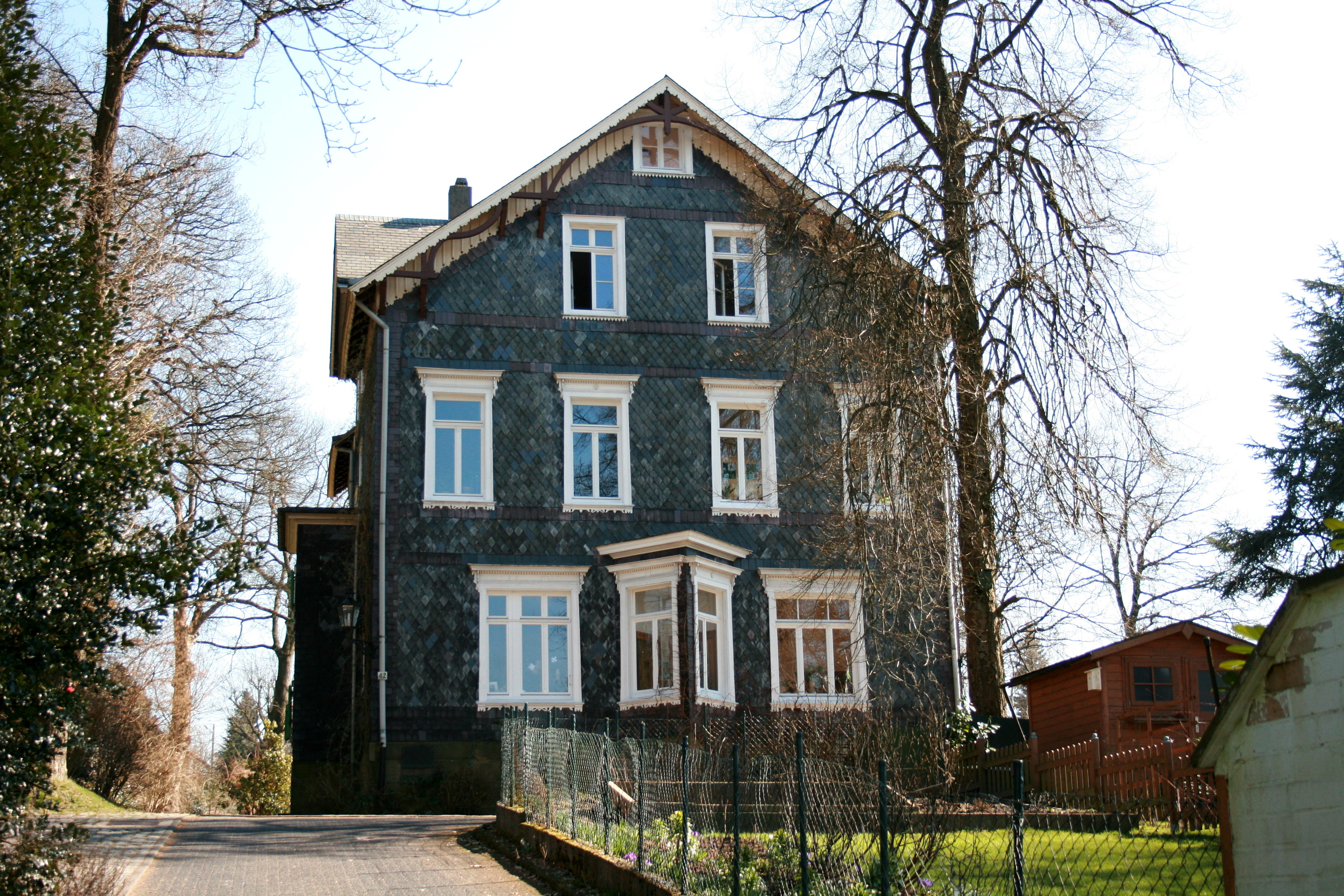
Carnap's birthplace in Wuppertal

Carnap was born Paul Rudolf Carnap on 18 May 1891 in Ronsdorf, in present-day Wuppertal, Germany. Carnap's father rose from being a poor ribbon-weaver to be the owner of a ribbon-making factory. His mother came from an academic family; her father was an educational reformer and her oldest brother was the archaeologist Wilhelm Dörpfeld.

As a ten-year-old, Carnap accompanied Dörpfeld on an expedition to Greece. At 14, Carnap taught himself Esperanto, and he attended the World Congress of Esperanto in Dresden in 1908. He would later attend the 1924 Congress in Vienna, where he met his fellow Esperantist Otto Neurath for the first time. Carnap was raised in a profoundly religious Protestant family, but later became an atheist.

He began his formal education at the Barmen Gymnasium and the Carolo-Alexandrinum Gymnasium in Jena. From 1910 to 1914, he attended the University of Jena, intending to write a thesis in physics. He also intently studied Immanuel Kant's Critique of Pure Reason during a course taught by Bruno Bauch, and was one of the very few students to attend Gottlob Frege's courses in mathematical logic.

During his university years, he became enthralled with the German Youth Movement.

While Carnap held moral and political opposition to World War I, he served in the German army. After three years of service, he was given permission to study physics at the University of Berlin, 1917–18, where Albert Einstein was a newly appointed professor. In August 1918 Carnap joined the Independent Social Democratic Party and worked as a journalist for left-wing newspapers. He then attended the University of Jena, where he wrote a thesis defining an axiomatic theory of space and time. The physics department said it was too philosophical, and Bruno Bauch of the philosophy department said it was pure physics. Carnap then wrote another thesis in 1921, under Bauch's supervision, on the theory of space in a more orthodox Kantian style, published as Der Raum (Space) in a supplemental issue of Kant-Studien (1922).

Frege's course exposed him to Bertrand Russell's work on logic and philosophy, which gave a sense of direction to his studies. He accepted the effort to surpass traditional philosophy with logical innovations that inform the sciences. He wrote a letter to Russell, who responded by copying by hand long passages from his Principia Mathematica for Carnap's benefit, as neither Carnap nor his university could afford a copy of this epochal work. In 1924 and 1925, he attended seminars led by Edmund Husserl, the founder of phenomenology, and continued to write on physics from a logical positivist perspective.

== Career ==
Carnap discovered a kindred spirit when he met Hans Reichenbach at a 1923 conference. Reichenbach introduced Carnap to Moritz Schlick, a professor at the University of Vienna who offered Carnap a position in his department, which Carnap accepted in 1926. Carnap thereupon joined an informal group of Viennese intellectuals that came to be known as the Vienna Circle, directed largely by Schlick and including Hans Hahn, Friedrich Waismann, Otto Neurath, and Herbert Feigl, with occasional visits by Hahn's student Kurt Gödel. When Wittgenstein visited Vienna, Carnap would meet with him. He (with Hahn and Neurath) wrote the 1929 manifesto of the Circle, and (with Hans Reichenbach) initiated the philosophy journal Erkenntnis.

In February 1930, Alfred Tarski lectured in Vienna, and during November 1930, Carnap visited Warsaw. On these occasions, he learned much about Tarski's model-theoretic method of semantics. Rose Rand, another philosopher in the Vienna Circle, noted, "Carnap's conception of semantics starts from the basis given in Tarski's work, but a distinction is made between logical and non-logical constants, and between logical and factual truth... At the same time, he worked with the concepts of intension and extension, and took these two concepts as a basis of a new method of semantics."

In 1931, Carnap was appointed Professor at the German University in Prague. In 1933, W. V. Quine met Carnap in Prague and discussed the latter's work at some length. Thus began the lifelong mutual respect these two men shared, one that survived Quine's eventual forceful disagreements with a number of Carnap's philosophical conclusions.

Carnap, whose socialist and pacifist beliefs put him at risk in Nazi Germany, emigrated to the United States in 1935 and became a naturalized citizen in 1941. Meanwhile, back in Vienna, Schlick was murdered in 1936. From 1936 to 1952, Carnap was a professor of philosophy at the University of Chicago. During the late 1930s, Carnap offered an assistant position in philosophy to Carl Gustav Hempel, who accepted and became one of his most significant intellectual collaborators. Thanks partly to Quine's help, Carnap spent the years 1939–41 at Harvard University, where he was reunited with Tarski. Carnap (1963) later expressed some irritation about his time at Chicago, where he and Charles W. Morris were the only members of the department committed to the primacy of science and logic. (Their Chicago colleagues included Richard McKeon, Charles Hartshorne, and Manley Thompson.) Carnap's years at Chicago were nonetheless very productive ones. He wrote books on semantics (Carnap 1942, 1943, 1956), modal logic, and on the philosophical foundations of probability and inductive logic (Carnap 1950, 1952).

After a stint at the Institute for Advanced Study in Princeton (1952–1954), he joined the UCLA Department of Philosophy in 1954, Hans Reichenbach having died the previous year. He had earlier refused an offer of a similar job at the University of California, Berkeley, because accepting that position required that he sign a loyalty oath, a practice to which he was opposed on principle. While at UCLA, he wrote on scientific knowledge, the analytic–synthetic distinction, and the verification principle. His writings on thermodynamics and on the foundations of probability and inductive logic were published posthumously as Carnap (1971, 1977, 1980).

In the US, Carnap was somewhat politically involved. Carnap was a signatory of an open appeal distributed by the National Committee to Secure Justice in the Rosenberg Case to appeal for clemency in the case. He was listed as a 'sponsor' for the "National Conference to Appeal the Walter-McCarran Law and Defend Its Victims" organised by the American Committee for the Protection of the Foreign Born, and also for the "Scientific and Cultural Conference for World Peace" organised by the National Council of Arts, Sciences and Professions.

== Personal life ==
Carnap had four children by his first marriage to Elizabeth Schöndube, which ended in divorce in 1929. He married his second wife, Elizabeth Ina Stöger, in 1933. Ina committed suicide in 1964.

== Philosophical work ==
Below is an examination of the main topics in the evolution of the philosophy of Rudolf Carnap. It is not exhaustive, but it outlines Carnap's main works and contributions to modern epistemology and philosophy of logic.

=== Der Raum ===
From 1919 to 1921, Carnap worked on a doctoral thesis called Der Raum: Ein Beitrag zur Wissenschaftslehre (Space: A Contribution to the Theory of Science, 1922). In this dissertation on the philosophical foundations of geometry, Carnap tried to provide a logical basis for a theory of space and time in physics. Considering that Carnap was interested in pure mathematics, natural sciences and philosophy, his dissertation can be seen as an attempt to build a bridge between the different disciplines that are geometry, physics, and philosophy. For Carnap thought that in many instances those disciplines use the same concepts, but with totally different meanings. The main objective of Carnap's dissertation was to show that the inconsistencies between theories concerning space only existed because philosophers, as well as mathematicians and scientists, were talking about different things while using the same "space" word. Hence, Carnap characteristically argued that there had to be three separate notions of space. "Formal" space being space in the sense of mathematics, as an abstract system of relations. "Intuitive" space being made of certain contents of intuition independent of single experiences. "Physical" space being made of actual spatial facts given in experience. The upshot is that those three kinds of "space" imply three different kinds of knowledge and thus three different kinds of investigations. It is interesting to note that it is in this dissertation that the main themes of Carnap's philosophy appear, most importantly, the idea that many philosophical contradictions appear because of a misuse of language, and a stress on the importance of distinguishing formal and material modes of speech.

=== Der Logische Aufbau der Welt ===
Carnap in 1922

From 1922 to 1925, Carnap worked on a book which became one of his major works, namely Der logische Aufbau der Welt (translated as The Logical Structure of the World, 1967), which was accepted in 1926 as his habilitation thesis at the University of Vienna and published as a book in 1928. That achievement has become a landmark in modern epistemology and can be read as a forceful statement of the philosophical thesis of logical positivism. Indeed, the Aufbau suggests that epistemology, based on modern symbolic logic, is concerned with the logical analysis of scientific propositions, while science itself, based on experience, is the only source of knowledge of the external world, i.e. the world outside the realm of human perception. According to Carnap, philosophical propositions are statements about the language of science; they are not true or false, but merely consist of definitions and conventions about the use of certain concepts. In contrast, scientific propositions are empirical statements that describe and explain aspects of external reality based on observation, evidence, and systematic investigation. They are meaningful because they are based on the perceptions of the senses. In other words, the truth or falsity of those propositions can be verified by testing their content with further observations.

In the Aufbau, Carnap wants to display the logical and conceptual structure with which all scientific (factual) statements can be organized. Carnap gives the label "constitution theory" (German: Konstitutionstheorie) to this epistemic-logical project. It is a constructive undertaking that systematizes scientific knowledge according to the notions of symbolic logic. Accordingly, the purpose of this constitutional system is to identify and discern different classes of scientific concepts and to specify the logical relations that link them. To this end, Carnap introduces the method of quasi-analysis (Quasianalyse), which allows qualitative properties and classes to be reconstructed from relations of recollected similarity between elementary experiences, without presupposing that such properties are given as independently identifiable components of experience.

In the Aufbau, concepts are taken to denote objects, relations, properties, classes and states. Carnap argues that all concepts must be ranked over a hierarchy. In that hierarchy, all concepts are organized according to a fundamental arrangement where concepts can be reduced and converted to other basic ones. Carnap explains that a concept can be reduced to another when all sentences containing the first concept can be transformed into sentences containing the other. In other words, every scientific sentence should be translatable into another sentence such that the original terms have the same reference as the translated terms. Most significantly, Carnap argues that the system has an autopsychological basis (eigenpsychische Basis), consisting of what is immediately given in experience. Its basic elements are elementary experiences (Elementarerlebnisse), understood as undifferentiated, momentary experiences of consciousness. These basic elements consist of conscious psychological states of a single human subject. In the end, Carnap argues that his constitutional project demonstrates the possibility of defining and uniting all scientific concepts in a single conceptual system on the basis of a few fundamental concepts.

=== Overcoming metaphysics ===
Carnap in 1929

From 1928 to 1934, Carnap published papers (Scheinprobleme in der Philosophie, 1928; translated as Pseudoproblems in Philosophy, 1967) in which he appears overtly skeptical of the aims and methods of metaphysics, i.e. the philosophical tradition that seeks to describe the underlying or ultimate nature of reality. Indeed, he opines that, in many cases, metaphysics is made of meaningless discussions of pseudo-problems. For Carnap, a pseudo-problem is a philosophical question that, on the surface, handles concepts that refer to our world while, in fact, these concepts do not actually denote real and attested objects. In other words, these pseudo-problems concern statements that do not, in any way, have empirical implications. They do not refer to states of affairs and the things they denote cannot be perceived. Consequently, one of Carnap's main aims has been to redefine the purpose and method of philosophy. According to him, philosophy should not aim at producing any knowledge transcending the knowledge of science. In contrast, by analyzing the language and propositions of science, philosophers should define the logical foundations of scientific knowledge. Using symbolic logic, they should explicate the concepts, methods, and justificatory processes that exist in science.

Carnap believed that the difficulty with traditional philosophy lay in the use of concepts that are not useful for science. For Carnap, the scientific legitimacy of these concepts was doubtful because the sentences containing them do not express facts. Indeed, a logical analysis of those sentences proves that they do not convey the meaning of states of affairs. In other words, these sentences are meaningless (for logical positivists). Carnap explains that to be meaningful, a sentence should be factual. It can be so, for one thing, by being based on experience, i.e., by being formulated with words relating to direct observations. For another, a sentence is factual if one can clearly state what the observations are that could confirm or disconfirm that sentence. After all, Carnap presupposes a specific criterion of meaning, namely the Wittgensteinian principle of verifiability. Indeed, he requires, as a precondition of meaningfulness, that all sentences be verifiable, which implies that a sentence is meaningful only if there is a way to verify if it is true or false. To verify a sentence, one needs to expound the empirical conditions and circumstances that would establish the truth of the sentence. As a result, it is clear for Carnap that metaphysical sentences are meaningless. They include concepts like "god", "soul", and "the absolute" that transcend experience and cannot be traced back or connected to direct observations. Because those sentences cannot be verified in any way, Carnap suggests that science, as well as philosophy, should neither consider nor contain them.

=== The logical analysis of language ===
At that point in his career, Carnap attempted to develop a full theory of the logical structure of scientific language. This theory, exposed in Logische Syntax der Sprache (1934; translated as The Logical Syntax of Language, 1937) gives the foundations to his idea that scientific language has a specific formal structure and that its signs are governed by the rules of deductive logic. Moreover, the theory of logical syntax expounds a method with which one can talk about a language: it is a formal meta-theory about the pure forms of language. In the end, because Carnap argues that philosophy aims at the logical analysis of the language of science and thus is the logic of science, the theory of the logical syntax can be considered as a definite language and a conceptual framework for philosophy.

The logical syntax of language is a formal theory. It is not concerned with the contextualized meaning or the truth-value of sentences. In contrast, it considers the general structure of a given language and explores the different structural relations that connect the elements of that language. Hence, by explaining the different operations that allow specific transformations within the language, the theory is a systematic exposition of the rules that operate within that language. In fact, the basic function of these rules is to provide the principles to safeguard coherence, to avoid contradictions, and to deduce justified conclusions. Carnap sees language as a calculus. This calculus is a systematic arrangement of symbols and relations. The symbols of the language are organized according to the class that they belong to—and it is through their combination that we can form sentences. The relations are different conditions under which a sentence can be said to follow, or to be the consequence, of another sentence. The definitions included in the calculus state the conditions under which a sentence can be considered of a certain type and how those sentences can be transformed. We can see the logical syntax as a method of formal transformation, i.e., a method for calculating and reasoning with symbols.

Finally, Carnap introduces his well-known "principle of tolerance." This principle suggests that there is no moral in logic. When it comes to using a language, there is no good or bad, fundamentally true or false. In this perspective, the philosopher's task is not to bring authoritative interdicts prohibiting the use of certain concepts. In contrast, philosophers should seek general agreements over the relevance of certain logical devices. According to Carnap, those agreements are possible only through the detailed presentation of the meaning and use of the expressions of a language. In other words, Carnap believes that every logical language is correct only if this language is supported by exact definitions and not by philosophical presumptions. Carnap embraces a formal conventionalism. That implies that formal languages are constructed and that everyone is free to choose the language they find more suited to their purpose. There should not be any controversy over which language is the correct language; what matters is agreeing over which language best suits a particular purpose. Carnap explains that the choice of a language should be guided according to the security it provides against logical inconsistency. Furthermore, practical elements like simplicity and fruitfulness in certain tasks influence the choice of a language. Clearly enough, the principle of tolerance was a sophisticated device introduced by Carnap to dismiss any form of dogmatism in philosophy.

=== Inductive logic ===
After having considered problems in semantics, i.e. the theory of the concepts of meaning and truth (Foundations of Logic and Mathematics, 1939; Introduction to Semantics, 1942; Formalization of Logic, 1943), Carnap turned his attention to the subject of probability and inductive logic. His views on that subject are, for the most part exposed in Logical foundations of probability (1950) where Carnap aims to give a sound logical interpretation of probability. Carnap thought that, according to certain conditions, the concept of probability had to be interpreted as a purely logical concept. In this view, probability is a basic concept anchored in all inductive inferences, whereby the conclusion of every inference that holds without deductive necessity is said to be more or less likely to be the case. In fact, Carnap claims that the problem of induction is a matter of finding a precise explanation of the logical relation that holds between a hypothesis and the evidence that supports it. An inductive logic is thus based on the idea that probability is a logical relation between two types of statements: the hypothesis (conclusion) and the premises (evidence). Accordingly, a theory of induction should explain how, by pure logical analysis, we can ascertain that certain evidence establishes a degree of confirmation strong enough to confirm a given hypothesis.

Carnap was convinced that there was a logical as well as an empirical dimension in science. He believed that one had to isolate the experiential elements from the logical elements of a given body of knowledge. Hence, the empirical concept of frequency used in statistics to describe the general features of certain phenomena can be distinguished from the analytical concepts of probability logic that merely describe logical relations between sentences. For Carnap, the statistical and the logical concepts must be investigated separately. Having insisted on this distinction, Carnap defines two concepts of probability. The first one is logical and deals with the degree to which a given hypothesis is confirmed by a piece of evidence. It is the degree of confirmation. The second is empirical and relates to the long-run rate of one observable feature of nature relative to another. It is the relative frequency. Statements belonging to the second concept are about reality and describe states of affairs. They are empirical and, therefore, must be based on experimental procedures and the observation of relevant facts. On the contrary, statements belonging to the first concept do not say anything about facts. Their meaning can be grasped solely with an analysis of the signs they contain. They are analytical sentences, i.e. true by virtue of their logical meaning. Even though these sentences could refer to states of affairs, their meaning is given by the symbols and relations they contain. In other words, the probability of a conclusion is given by the logical relation it has to the evidence. The evaluation of the degree of confirmation of a hypothesis is thus a problem of meaning analysis.

Clearly, the probability of a statement about relative frequency can be unknown because it depends on the observation of certain phenomena, and one may not possess the information needed to establish the value of that probability. Consequently, the value of that statement can be confirmed only if it is corroborated by facts. In contrast, the probability of a statement about the degree of confirmation could be unknown, in the sense that one may miss the correct logical method to evaluate its exact value. But, such a statement can always receive a certain logical value, given the fact that this value only depends on the meaning of its symbols.

== Primary source materials ==
The Rudolf Carnap Papers contain thousands of letters, notes and drafts, and diaries. The majority of his papers were purchased from his daughter, Hanna Carnap-Thost in 1974, by the University of Pittsburgh, with subsequent further accessions. Documents that contain financial, medical, and personal information are restricted. These were written over his entire life and career. Carnap used the mail regularly to discuss philosophical problems with hundreds of others. The most notable were: Herbert Feigl, Carl Gustav Hempel, Felix Kaufmann, Otto Neurath, and Moritz Schlick. Photographs are also part of the collection and were taken throughout his life. Family pictures and photographs of his peers and colleagues are also stored in the collection. Some of the correspondence is considered notable and consist of his student notes, his seminars with Frege (describing the Begriffsschrift and the logic in mathematics). Carnap's notes from Russell's seminar in Chicago, and notes he took from discussions with Tarski, Heisenberg, Quine, Hempel, Gödel, and Jeffrey are also part of the University of Pittsburgh Library System's Archives and Special Collections. Digitized contents include:

- Notes (old), 1958–1966
- More than 1,000 pages of lecture outlines are preserved that cover the courses that Carnap taught in the United States, Prague, and Vienna. Drafts of his published works and unpublished works are part of the collection. Additional Carnap materials can be found throughout the Archives of Scientific Philosophy at the University of Pittsburgh.
- Manuscript drafts and typescripts both for his published works and for many unpublished papers and books. A partial listing include his first formulations of his Aufbau.

Much material is written in an older German shorthand, the Stolze-Schrey system. He employed this writing system extensively beginning in his student days. Some of the content has been digitized and is available through the finding aid. The University of California also maintains a collection of Rudolf Carnap Papers. Microfilm copies of his papers are maintained by the Philosophical Archives at the University of Konstanz in Germany.

Oxford University Press is publishing a fourteen-volume set of Carnap's collected works, organized by general editor Richard Creath. The first volume, Early Writings, appeared in 2019, and the seventh volume (though second in publication order), Studies in Semantics, appeared in 2024.

== Selected publications ==
- 1922. Der Raum: Ein Beitrag zur Wissenschaftslehre, Kant-Studien, Ergänzungshefte. 56 (his 1921 doctoral thesis, published as a monograph supplement to the Kant-Studien journal).
  - English translation: "Space: A Contribution to the Theory of Science" (2005 draft), published version in: The Collected Works of Rudolf Carnap, Volume 1: Early Writings (2019) pp. 21–208 ISBN 978-0-19-874840-3
- 1926. Physikalische Begriffsbildung. Karlsruhe: Braun.
  - English translation: "Physical Concept Formation" (1992 draft), published version in: Collected Works (2019) pp. 339–440
- 1928. Scheinprobleme in der Philosophie (Pseudoproblems in Philosophy). Berlin: Weltkreis-Verlag.
- 1928. Der Logische Aufbau der Welt (his habilitation thesis). Leipzig: Felix Meiner Verlag.
  - English translation: Rolf A. George, 1967. The Logical Structure of the World. Pseudoproblems in Philosophy. University of California Press. ISBN 0-812-69523-2
- 1929. Abriss der Logistik, mit besonderer Berücksichtigung der Relationstheorie und ihrer Anwendungen.
  - (Revised) English translation: Introduction to Symbolic Logic (1958)
- 1931. "Überwindung der Metaphysik durch logische Analyse der Sprache" (PDF). Erkenntnis. 2: 219–241. 1931. doi:10.1007/BF02028153. S2CID 144658746.
  - English translation: "The Elimination of Metaphysics Through Logical Analysis of Language" – Pap, Arthur (trans.) in: Ayer, A.J (ed.) Logical Positivism (1965) pp. 60–81 ISBN 978-0-02-901130-0
- 1934. Logische Syntax der Sprache.
  - English translation: 1937, The Logical Syntax of Language. Kegan Paul.
- 1935. Philosophy and Logical Syntax. Bristol UK: Thoemmes. Excerpt.
- 1939, Foundations of Logic and Mathematics in International Encyclopedia of Unified Science, Vol. I, No. 3. University of Chicago Press.
- 1942. Introduction to Semantics. Harvard Uni. Press.
- 1943. Formalization of Logic. Harvard Uni. Press.
- 1945. "On Inductive Logic" in Philosophy of Science, Vol. 12, pp. 72–97.
- 1945. "The Two Concepts of Probability" Philosophy and Phenomenological Research, Vol. 5, No. 4, pp.513–532.
- 1947. "On the Application of Inductive Logic" in Philosophy and Phenomenological Research, Vol. 8, pp.133–148.
- 1947. Meaning and Necessity: a Study in Semantics and Modal Logic. University of Chicago Press. [enlarged edition published in 1956]
- 1950, (1962 2nd ed:) Logical Foundations of Probability. University of Chicago Press. pp. 3–15.
- 1950. "Empiricism, Semantics, Ontology", Revue Internationale de Philosophie 4: 20–40. JSTOR 23932367 reprinted in: Paul Benacerraf & Hilary Putnam (eds.), Philosophy of Mathematics: Selected Readings (1964)
- 1952. The Continuum of Inductive Methods. University of Chicago Press.
- 1958. Introduction to Symbolic Logic and its Applications. trans. W. H. Myer and J. Wilkinson, Dover publications, New York. ISBN 978-0-486-60453-4 [revised and translated version of Abriss der Logistik (1929)]
- 1962. "The Aim of Inductive Logic" in (eds.) Nagel, Suppes, and Tarski, Logic, Methodology and Philosophy of Science Stanford,, pp 303–318 (revised and expanded in Carnap & Jeffrey 1971).
- 1963, "Intellectual Autobiography" in Schilpp. Paul A. (ed.) The Philosophy of Rudolf Carnap, Library Of Living Philosophers V. XI, Open Court p. 3–83 (1963) ISBN 0-8126-9153-9, 978-0812691535
- 1964. "The Logicist Foundations of Mathematics" in Paul Benacerraf & Hilary Putnam (eds.), Philosophy of Mathematics: Selected Readings. Englewood Cliffs, NJ, USA: Cambridge University Press. pp. 41--52
- 1966. An Introduction to the Philosophy of Science. Basic Books.
- 1966. Philosophical Foundations of Physics. Martin Gardner, ed. Basic Books. Online excerpt.
- 1971. Studies in Inductive Logic and Probability, Vol. 1. with Jeffrey, R. C, University of California Press.
- 1973 "Notes on probability and induction" Synthese 25 (3-4):269 - 298, reprinted with slight revision in Hintikka (1975)
- 1975 "Observation Language and Theoretical Language", in Jaakko Hintikka (ed.), Rudolf Carnap, logical empiricist: materials and perspectives. Boston: D. Reidel Pub. Co.. pp. 75--85 [translation of "Beobachtungssprache und Theoretische Sprache", Dialectica, 12(3–4): 236–248 1958]
- 1977. Two Essays on Entropy. Shimony, Abner, ed. University of California Press.
- 1980. "A Basic System of Inductive Logic Part II" in: Jeffrey, R. C. (ed.) Studies in Inductive Logic and Probability, Vol. 2. . University of California Press.
- 2000. Untersuchungen zur Allgemeinen Axiomatik. Edited from unpublished manuscript by T. Bonk and J. Mosterín. Darmstadt: Wissenschaftliche Buchgesellschaft. 167 ISBN 3-534-14298-5..
- 2017, "Value Concepts (1958)", Synthese, 194(1): 185–194. doi:10.1007/s11229-015-0793-2
- 2019. Rudolf Carnap: Early Writings, A.W. Carus, Michael Friedman, Wolfgang Kienzler, Alan Richardson, and Sven Schlotter (eds.), (The Collected Works of Rudolf Carnap, 1), New York: Oxford University Press.
- 2024. Rudolf Carnap: Studies in Semantics, Steve Awodey and Greg Frost-Arnold (eds.), (The Collected Works of Rudolf Carnap, 7) New York: Oxford University Press.

*For a more complete listing see Carnap's Works in "Linked bibliography".

== Filmography ==
- Interview with Rudolf Carnap, German TV, 1964

== See also ==
- Definitions of philosophy
- Second Conference on the Epistemology of the Exact Sciences
- Second Davos Hochschulkurs

== Sources ==
- Richard Creath, Michael Friedman, ed. (2007). The Cambridge Companion to Carnap. Cambridge University Press. ISBN 978-0-521-84015-6.
- Roger F Gibson, ed. (2004). The Cambridge companion to Quine. Cambridge University Press. ISBN 0-521-63949-2.
- Ivor Grattan-Guinness, 2000. In Search of Mathematical Roots. Princeton Uni. Press.
- Thomas Mormann, 2000. Rudolf Carnap. C. H. Beck.
- Willard Quine
  - 1951, "Two Dogmas of Empiricism." The Philosophical Review 60: 20–43. Reprinted in his 1953 From a Logical Point of View. Harvard University Press.
  - 1985, The Time of My Life: An Autobiography. MIT Press.
- Richardson, Alan W., 1998. Carnap's construction of the world: the Aufbau and the emergence of logical empiricism. Cambridge Uni. Press.
- Schilpp, P. A., ed., 1963. The Philosophy of Rudolf Carnap. LaSalle IL: Open Court.
- Spohn, Wolfgang, ed., 1991. Erkenntnis Orientated: A Centennial Volume for Rudolf Carnap and Hans Reichenbach. Kluwer Academic Publishers.
- 1991. Logic, Language, and the Structure of Scientific Theories: Proceedings of the Carnap-Reichenbach Centennial, University of Konstanz, May 21–24, 1991. University of Pittsburgh Press.
- Wagner, Pierre, ed., 2009. Carnap's Logical Syntax of Language. Palgrave Macmillan.
- Wagner, Pierre, ed., 2012. Carnap's Ideal of Explication and Naturalism. Palgrave Macmillan.
