= Carl Gustav Hempel =

German writer and philosopher (1905–1997)

- Born: January 8, 1905; Oranienburg, German Empire
- Died: November 9, 1997 (aged 92); Princeton, New Jersey, U.S.

Education
- Education: University of Göttingen; University of Berlin (PhD, 1934); Heidelberg University
- Thesis: Beiträge zur logischen Analyse des Wahrscheinlichkeitsbegriffs (Contributions to the Logical Analysis of the Concept of Probability) (1934)
- Doctoral advisors: Nicolai Hartmann; Wolfgang Köhler; Hans Reichenbach
- Other advisor: Rudolf Carnap

Philosophical work
- Era: 20th-century philosophy
- Region: Western philosophy
- School: Analytic philosophy Berlin Circle; Logical behaviorism
- Institutions: University of Chicago; City College of New York; Yale University; Princeton University; Hebrew University; University of Pittsburgh
- Doctoral students: John Earman; Michael Friedman; Adolf Grünbaum; Jaegwon Kim; Robert Nozick
- Notable students: Carl Icahn; Philip Kitcher; Robert Stalnaker
- Main interests: Philosophy of science; Logic; Confirmation theory
- Notable ideas: Deductive-nomological model; Inductive-statistical model; Internal vs. bridge principles; Hempel's paradox; Hempel's dilemma; Explanandum and explanans

Carl Gustav "Peter" Hempel (/ˈhɛmpəl/; German: [ˈhɛmpl̩]; January 8, 1905 – November 9, 1997) was a German writer, philosopher, logician, and epistemologist. He was a major figure in logical empiricism, a 20th-century movement in the philosophy of science. Hempel articulated the deductive-nomological model of scientific explanation, which was considered the "standard model" of scientific explanation during the 1950s and 1960s. He is also known for the raven paradox ("Hempel's paradox") and Hempel's dilemma.

== Education ==
Hempel studied mathematics, physics and philosophy at the University of Göttingen and subsequently at the University of Berlin and the Heidelberg University. In Göttingen, he encountered David Hilbert and was impressed by his program attempting to base all mathematics on solid logical foundations derived from a limited number of axioms.

After moving to Berlin, Hempel participated in a congress on scientific philosophy in 1929 where he met Rudolf Carnap and became involved in the Berlin Circle of philosophers associated with the Vienna Circle. In 1934, he received his doctoral degree from the University of Berlin with a dissertation on probability theory, titled Beiträge zur logischen Analyse des Wahrscheinlichkeitsbegriffs (Contributions to the Logical Analysis of the Concept of Probability). Hans Reichenbach was Hempel's main doctoral supervisor, but after Reichenbach lost his philosophy chair in Berlin in 1933, Wolfgang Köhler and Nicolai Hartmann became the official supervisors.

== Career ==
Within a year of completing his doctorate, the increasingly repressive and anti-semitic Nazi regime in Germany had prompted Hempel to emigrate to Belgium as his wife was of Jewish ancestry. In this he was aided by the scientist Paul Oppenheim, with whom he co-authored the book Der Typusbegriff im Lichte der neuen Logik on typology and logic in 1936. In 1937, Hempel emigrated to the United States, where he accepted a position as Carnap's assistant at the University of Chicago. He later held positions at the City College of New York (1939–1948), Yale University (1948–1955) and Princeton University, where he taught alongside Thomas Kuhn and remained until made emeritus in 1973. Between 1974 and 1976, he was an emeritus at the Hebrew University in Jerusalem before becoming University Professor of Philosophy at the University of Pittsburgh in 1977 and teaching there until 1985. In 1989 the Department of Philosophy at Princeton University renamed its Three Lecture Series the 'Carl G. Hempel Lectures' in his honor. He was an elected member of the American Academy of Arts and Sciences and of the American Philosophical Society for which he served as president.

Hempel died, aged 92, on November 9, 1997 at a nursing home near Princeton, New Jersey.

== Philosophical views ==
Hempel never embraced the term "logical positivism" as an accurate description of the Vienna Circle and Berlin Group, preferring to describe those philosophers, including himself, as "logical empiricists." He believed that the term "positivism," with its roots in the materialism of Auguste Comte, implied a metaphysics that empiricists were not obliged to embrace. He regarded Ludwig Wittgenstein as a philosopher with a genius for stating philosophical insights in striking and memorable language, but believed that he, or at least the Wittgenstein of the Tractatus, made claims that could only be supported by recourse to metaphysics. To Hempel, metaphysics involved claims to know things which were not knowable; that is, metaphysical hypotheses were incapable of confirmation or disconfirmation by evidence.

In his exploration of the philosophy of science, Hempel brought to light the significant contributions of 19th-century Hungarian physician Ignaz Semmelweis. His examination of Semmelweis's systematic discovery in addressing a scientific problem provided a historical context for Hempel's own reflections. This account of Semmelweis's work notably influenced Hempel's thoughts on the role of 'induction' in scientific inquiry. He considered Semmelweis's approach as a pivotal example of how empirical evidence and inductive reasoning play a crucial role in the development of scientific knowledge, further enriching his perspective on logical empiricism.

Hempel is also credited with the revival of the Deductive-nomological model of explanation in the 1940s with the publication of "The function of general laws in history".

== Legacy ==
In 2005, the City of Oranienburg, Hempel's birthplace, renamed one of its streets "Carl-Gustav-Hempel-Straße" in his memory.

== Bibliography ==
=== Principal works ===
- 1936: "Über den Gehalt von Wahrscheinlichkeitsaussagen" and, with Paul Oppenheim, "Der Typusbegriff im Licht der neuen Logik"
- 1942: "The Function of General Laws in History"
- 1943: "Studies in the Logic of Confirmation"
- 1959: "The Logic of Functional Analysis"
- 1965: Aspects of Scientific Explanation
- 1966: Philosophy of Natural Science

=== Essay collections ===
- Aspects of Scientific Explanation and Other Essays (1965), ISBN 0-02-914340-3.
- Selected Philosophical Essays (2000), ISBN 0-521-62475-4.
- The Philosophy of Carl G. Hempel: Studies in Science, Explanation, and Rationality (2001), ISBN 0-19-512136-8.

=== Articles ===
- ″On the Nature of Mathematical Truth" and "Geometry and Empirical Science" (1945), American Mathematical Monthly, issue 52.
- Articles in Readings in Philosophical Analysis (pp. 222–249), edited by Herbert Feigl and Wilfrid Sellars (Appleton-Century-Crofts, Inc., 1949).
