= Charles W. Morris =

American semiotician and philosopher

- Born: Charles William Morris; May 23, 1901; Denver, Colorado, U.S.
- Died: January 15, 1979 (aged 77); Gainesville, Florida, U.S.
- Education: University of Chicago; Northwestern University
- Scientific career
- Fields: Semiotics; Philosophy
- Workplaces: Rice University; University of Chicago; University of Florida
- Doctoral advisor: George Herbert Mead

Charles William Morris (May 23, 1901 – January 15, 1979) was an American philosopher and semiotician.

== Early life and education ==
A son of Charles William and Laura (Campbell) Morris, Charles William Morris was born on May 23, 1901, in Denver, Colorado.

Morris briefly attended the University of Wisconsin, and later studied engineering and psychology at Northwestern University, where he graduated with a B.S. in 1922. That same year, he entered the University of Chicago where he became a doctoral student in philosophy under the direction of George Herbert Mead. Morris completed his dissertation on a symbolic theory of mind and received a Ph.D. from the University of Chicago in 1925.

== Career ==
After his graduation, Morris turned to teaching, first at Rice University, and later at the University of Chicago. In 1958 he became Research Professor at the University of Florida. His students included semiotician Thomas A. Sebeok. In 1937 Morris presided over the Western Division of the American Philosophical Association, and was Fellow of the American Academy of Arts and Sciences.

Morris was an instructor of philosophy for six years from 1925 to 1931 at Rice University in Houston, Texas. After leaving Rice, he was associate professor of philosophy at the University of Chicago from 1931 to 1947. Morris became a lecturing professor at Chicago in 1948, occupying the position until 1958 when he received an offer for a special appointment as a Research Professor at the University of Florida, where he remained until his death.

During his time at Rice University, Morris wrote and defended his philosophical perspective known as neo-pragmatism. He also worked on and published Six Theories of Mind. At the end of his term at Rice, Morris returned to the University of Chicago. In the early 1930s, the University of Chicago's philosophy department was unstable, but in the midst of change and difficult economic times, Morris felt that philosophy would serve as a torch that would light the way to saving world civilization. Morris had hoped to create an institute of philosophy at the University of Chicago, but his efforts to convince the university president of such a venture were unsuccessful.

=== Semiotics ===
Morris's development of a behavioral theory of signs—i.e., semiotics—is partly due to his desire to unify logical positivism with behavioral empiricism and pragmatism. Morris's union of these three philosophical perspectives eventuated in his claim that symbols have three types of relations:

1. to objects,
2. to persons, and
3. to other symbols.

He later called these relations "semantics", "pragmatics", and "syntactics". Viewing semiotics as a way to bridge philosophical outlooks, Morris grounded his sign theory in Mead's social behaviorism. In fact, Morris's interpretation of an interpretant, a term used in the semiotics of Charles Sanders Peirce, has been understood to be strictly psychological. Morris's system of signs emphasizes the role of stimulus and response in the orientation, manipulation, and consummation phases of action. His mature semiotic theory is traced out in Signs, Language, and Behavior (1946). Morris's semiotic is concerned with explaining the tri-relation between syntactics, semantics, and pragmatics in a dyadic way, which is very different from the semiotics of C. S. Peirce. This caused some to argue that Morris misinterpreted Peirce by converting the interpretant into a logically existent thing.

=== Institute for American Thought ===
Toward the end of his life in 1976, Morris sent two instalments of his work to the Institute for American Thought (IAT) at Indiana University Purdue University Indianapolis (IUPUI). Three years later in 1979, Morris's daughter, Sally Petrilli, arranged to have additional installments of his work sent to IUPUI. In 1984 Italian philosopher Ferruccio Rossi-Landi added to the Morris collection at IUPUI by sending his correspondence with Charles W. Morris. Among the vast Morris collection at the IAT are 381 titles of books and journal articles regarding pragmatism, logical empiricism, poetry, ethics, and Asian studies.

== Personal life ==
In 1925, Morris married Gertrude E. Thompson, with whom he had a daughter, Sally Morris Petrilli. In 1951, he married his second wife, Ellen Ruth Allen, a psychologist.

Charles William Morris died on January 15, 1979, in Gainesville, Florida.

=== Unity of Science Movement ===
While on sabbatical from the University of Chicago in 1934, Morris traveled abroad, visiting Europe and meeting working philosophers such as Bertrand Russell and members of the Vienna Circle, like Rudolf Carnap, Otto Neurath, and Moritz Schlick. Morris was greatly impressed with the logical positivist (logical empiricist) movement. While presenting a paper in Prague at the Eighth International Congress of Philosophy, he discussed his hopes for a union of pragmatism and positivism. Sympathetic to the positivist's philosophical project, Morris became the most vocal advocate in the United States for Otto Neurath's "Unity of Science Movement".

During the 1930s, Morris helped several German and Austrian philosophers emigrate to the United States, including Rudolf Carnap in 1936. As a part of the "Unity of Science Movement", Morris worked closely with Neurath and Carnap to produce the International Encyclopedia of Unified Science. As co-editor of the Encyclopedia, Morris procured publication in America from the University of Chicago Press. His involvement with the Encyclopedia spanned for ten years when the project lost momentum in 1943. Both Morris and Carnap found it difficult to keep the Encyclopedia alive due to insufficient funds. In the latter part of the 1940s, Morris was finally able to secure funding that allowed the project to last until its final publication in the 1970s.

== Selected publications ==
- Charles W. Morris (1925). Symbolism and Reality: A Study in the Nature of Mind. Dissertation, University of Chicago. Reprinted, Amsterdam: John Benjamins, 1993. Translated into German, Symbolik und Realitat, with an introduction by A. Eschbach. Frankfurt: Suhrkamp, 1981.
- Charles W. Morris (1932). Six Theories of Mind. Chicago: University of Chicago. Reprinted, 1966.
- Charles W. Morris (1937). Logical Positivism, Pragmatism and Scientific Empiricism. Paris: Hermann et Cie. Reprinted, New York: AMS Press, 1979.
- Charles W. Morris (1942). Paths of Life: Preface to a World Religion. New York: Harper and Brothers.
- Charles W. Morris (1946). Signs, Language and Behavior. New York: Prentice-Hall, 1946. Reprinted, New York: George Braziller, 1955. Reprinted in Charles Morris, Writings on the General Theory of Signs (The Hague: Mouton, 1971), pp. 73–397. Translated into Italian, Segni, linguaggio e comportamento, by S. Ceccato. Milan. Translated into German, Zeichen, Sprache und Verhalten, by A. Eschbach and G. Kopsch. Düsseldorf: Schwann, 1973.
- Charles W. Morris (1948). The Open Self. New York: Prentice-Hall; Translated into Swedish, Öppna Er Själv by Ann Bouleau. Stockholm: 1949.
- Charles W. Morris (1956). Varieties of Human Value. Chicago: University of Chicago Press. Reprinted, 1973.
- Charles W. Morris (1964). Signification and Significance: A Study of the Relations of Signs and Values. Cambridge, Mass.: MIT Press. Chap. 1, "Signs and the Act," is reprinted in Charles Morris, Writings on the General Theory of Signs (The Hague: Mouton, 1971), pp. 401–414.
- Charles W. Morris (1970). The Pragmatic Movement in American Philosophy. New York: George Braziller.
- Charles W. Morris (1971). Writings on the General Theory of Signs. Den Haag: Mouton.
- Charles W. Morris (1973). Cycles. Gainesville: University of Florida Press.
- Charles W. Morris (1975). Zeichen Wert Äesthetik. Mit einer Einleitung hg. u. übers. v. A. Eschbach. Frankfurt: Suhrkamp.
- Charles W. Morris (1976). Image. New York: Vantage Press.
- Charles W. Morris (1977). Pragmatische Semiotik und Handlungstheorie. Mit einer Einleitung hg. und übers. v. A. Eschbach. Frankfurt: Suhrkamp.

== See also ==
- American philosophy
- List of American philosophers
