= Philipp Frank =

Austrian-American physicist, mathematician and philosopher

- Born: March 20, 1884; Vienna, Austria-Hungary
- Died: July 21, 1966 (aged 82); Cambridge, Massachusetts, U.S.
- Education: University of Vienna
- Relatives: Josef Frank (brother)
- Scientific career
- Workplaces: German Charles-Ferdinand University, Harvard University, University of Vienna
- Doctoral advisor: Ludwig Boltzmann
- Doctoral students: Peter Bergmann, Reinhold Furth

Philipp Frank (Austrian German: [fraŋk]; March 20, 1884 – July 21, 1966) was an Austrian-American physicist, mathematician and philosopher of the early-to-mid 20th century. He was a logical positivist, and a member of the Vienna Circle. He was influenced by Mach and was one of the Machists criticised by Lenin in Materialism and Empirio-criticism.

== Biography ==
Frank studied physics at the University of Vienna and graduated in 1907 with a thesis in theoretical physics under the supervision of Ludwig Boltzmann. He joined the faculty there in 1910. Albert Einstein recommended him as his successor for a professorship at the German Charles-Ferdinand University of Prague, a position which he held from 1912 until 1938. Doctoral students included Reinhold Furth and Peter Bergmann.

In 1938, he was invited by Harvard University to America as a visiting lecturer on quantum theory and the philosophy of modern physics. The Germans having invaded Czechoslovakia as he was about to begin his scheduled lecture tour, Frank, a Jew, never returned to his position at Prague and instead became a lecturer on physics and mathematics at Harvard from that year until his retirement in 1954.

In 1947, he founded the Institute for the Unity of Science as part of the American Academy of Arts and Sciences (AAAS). This arose after Howard Mumford Jones (then president of the AAAS) had issued a call to overcome the fractionalization of knowledge, which he felt the AAAS was well suited to address. The institute held regular meetings attracting a broad range of participants. Quine regarded the organisation as a "Vienna Circle in exile". Politically, Frank was a socialist.

Astronomer Halton Arp described Frank's "Philosophy of Science" class at Harvard as being his favorite elective.

His younger brother Josef Frank was a noted architect and designer.

== Frank on Mach's principle ==
In lectures given during World War II at Harvard, Frank attributed to Mach himself the following graphic expression of Mach's principle:

"When the subway jerks, it's the fixed stars that throw you down."

In commenting on this formulation of the principle, Frank pointed out that Mach chose the subway for his example because it shows that inertial effects are not shielded (by the mass of the earth): The action of distant masses on the subway-rider's mass is direct and instantaneous. It is apparent why Mach's Principle, stated in this fashion, does not fit with Einstein's conception of the retardation of all distant action.

== Select publications ==
- Das kausalgesetz und seine Grenzen (1932), translated into English by Marie Neurath and Robert S. Cohen as The law of causality and its limits (Dordrecht: Kluwer Academic Publishers, 1998)
- Interpretations and misinterpretations of modern physics (1938)
- Between physics and philosophy (1941)
- Relativity and its astronomical implications: the significance of general relativity presented in the language of the layman (1943)
- Foundations of Physics, University of Chicago Press (1946)
- Einstein: His Life and Times, A. A. Knopf (1947); 2nd edition, Da Capo Press (2002)
- Einstein, his life and times (1948)
- "Einstein's Philosophy of Science," Review of Modern Physics, 21, 349 (1949)
- Relativity : a richer truth (1950). With foreword by Albert Einstein
- Modern science and its philosophy (1955)
- Philosophy of Science, Prentice Hall (1957)

== See also ==
- List of Austrian scientists
