= Hans Reichenbach =

German philosopher (1891–1953)

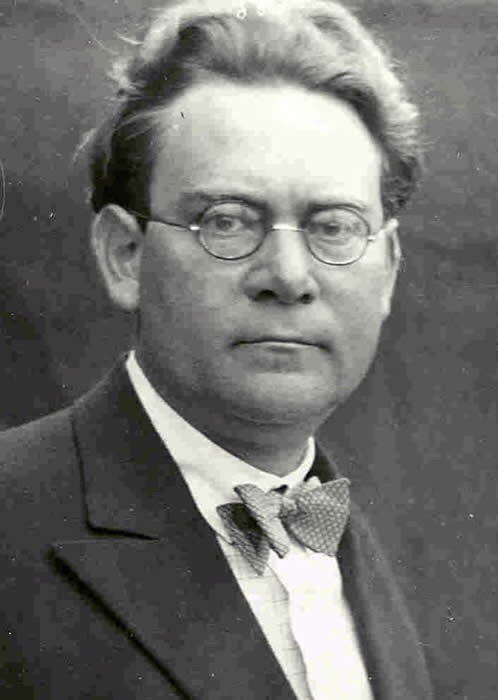
- Born: September 26, 1891; Hamburg, German Empire
- Died: April 9, 1953 (aged 61); Los Angeles, California, U.S.

Education
- Education: Friedrich Wilhelm University of Berlin; University of Göttingen; Ludwig-Maximilians-Universität München; University of Erlangen (PhD, 1916); Technische Hochschule Stuttgart (Dr. phil. hab., 1920)
- Theses: Der Begriff der Wahrscheinlichkeit für die mathematische Darstellung der Wirklichkeit (The Concept of Probability for the Mathematical Representation of Reality) (1916); The Theory of Relativity and A Priori Knowledge (Relativitätstheorie und Erkenntnis Apriori) (1920)
- Doctoral advisors: Paul Hensel, Max Noether (PhD advisors)
- Other advisors: Max Born, Ernst Cassirer, Albert Einstein, David Hilbert, Edmund Husserl, Max Planck, Arnold Sommerfeld

Philosophical work
- Era: 20th-century philosophy
- Region: Western philosophy
- School: Analytic; Berlin Circle; Logical empiricism
- Institutions: Friedrich Wilhelm University of Berlin; Istanbul University; UCLA
- Doctoral students: Carl Gustav Hempel, Hilary Putnam, Wesley Salmon
- Main interests: Philosophy of science
- Notable ideas: List: Probabilistic justification/reasoning Philosophical implications of the theory of relativity Philosophical foundations of quantum mechanics The "context of discovery"/"context of justification" distinction Relativized a priori (the fallible set of constitutive principles underlying knowledge) Axioms of connection (empirical laws) vs. axioms of coordination (constitutive principles)

Hans Reichenbach (/ˈraɪxənbɑːx/; German: [ˈʁaɪçənbax]; September 26, 1891 – April 9, 1953) was a leading philosopher of science, educator, and proponent of logical empiricism. He founded the Gesellschaft für empirische Philosophie (Society for Empirical Philosophy) in Berlin in 1928, also known as the "Berlin Circle". Carl Gustav Hempel, Richard von Mises, David Hilbert and Kurt Grelling all became members of the Berlin Circle.

In 1930, Reichenbach and Rudolf Carnap became editors of the journal Erkenntnis. He also made lasting contributions to the study of empiricism based on a theory of probability; the logic and the philosophy of mathematics; space, time, and relativity theory; analysis of probabilistic reasoning; and quantum mechanics. In 1951, he authored The Rise of Scientific Philosophy, his most popular book.

== Early life ==
Hans was the second son of a Jewish merchant, Bruno Reichenbach, who had converted to Protestantism. He married Selma Menzel, a school mistress, who came from a long line of Protestant professionals which went back to the Reformation. His elder brother Bernard played a significant role in the left communist movement. His younger brother, Herman was a music educator.

After completing secondary school in Hamburg, Hans Reichenbach studied civil engineering at the Hochschule für Technik Stuttgart, and physics, mathematics and philosophy at various universities, including the Friedrich Wilhelm University of Berlin, the University of Erlangen, the University of Göttingen and the Ludwig-Maximilians-Universität München. Among his teachers were Max Born, Ernst Cassirer, David Hilbert, Edmund Husserl, Max Planck, Arnold Sommerfeld.

== Political activism ==
Reichenbach was active in youth movements and student organizations. He joined the Freistudentenschaft in 1910. He attended the founding conference of the Freideutsche Jugend umbrella group at Hoher Meissner in 1913. He published articles about the university reform, the freedom of research, and against anti-Semitic infiltrations in student organizations. His older brother Bernard shared in this activism and went on to become a member of the Communist Workers' Party of Germany, representing this organisation on the Executive Committee of the Communist International. Hans wrote the Platform of the Socialist Student Party, Berlin which was published in 1918. The party had remained clandestine until the November Revolution when it was formally founded with him as chairman. He also worked with Karl Wittfogel, Alexander Schwab and his other brother Herman at this time. In 1919 his text Student und Sozialismus: mit einem Anhang: Programm der Sozialistischen Studentenpartei was published by Hermann Schüller, an activist with the League for Proletarian Culture. However following his attending lectures by Albert Einstein in 1919, he stopped participating in political groups.

== Academic career ==
Reichenbach received a degree in philosophy from the University of Erlangen in 1915 and his PhD dissertation on the theory of probability, titled Der Begriff der Wahrscheinlichkeit für die mathematische Darstellung der Wirklichkeit (The Concept of Probability for the Mathematical Representation of Reality) and supervised by Paul Hensel and Max Noether, was published in 1916. Reichenbach served during World War I on the Russian front, in the German army radio troops. In 1917, he was removed from active duty, due to an illness, and returned to Berlin. While working as a physicist and engineer, Reichenbach attended Albert Einstein's lectures on the theory of relativity at the Friedrich Wilhelm University of Berlin from 1917 to 1920.

In 1920, Reichenbach began teaching at the Technische Hochschule Stuttgart as Privatdozent. In the same year, he published his first book (which was accepted as his habilitation in physics at the Technische Hochschule Stuttgart) on the philosophical implications of the theory of relativity, The Theory of Relativity and A Priori Knowledge (Relativitätstheorie und Erkenntnis Apriori), which criticized the Kantian notion of synthetic a priori. He subsequently published Axiomatization of the Theory of Relativity (1924), From Copernicus to Einstein (1927) and The Philosophy of Space and Time (1928), the last stating the logical positivist view on the theory of relativity.

Reichenbach distinguishes between axioms of connection and of coordination. Axioms of connection are those scientific laws which specify specific relations between specific physical things, like Maxwell’s equations. They describe empirical laws. Axioms of coordination are those laws which describe all things and are a priori, like Euclidean geometry and are “general rules according to which the connections take place”. For example, the axioms of connection of gravitational equations are based upon the axioms of coordination of arithmetic.

Another distinction of his was between the 'context of discovery' and 'context of justification'. The way scientists come up with ideas is not always the same as the way they justify them, and so as separate objects of study Reichenbach distinguished between them.

In 1926, with the help of Albert Einstein, Max Planck and Max von Laue, Reichenbach became assistant professor in the physics department of the Friedrich Wilhelm University of Berlin. He gained notice for his methods of teaching, as he was easily approached and his courses were open to discussion and debate. This was highly unusual at the time, although the practice is nowadays a common one.

In 1928, Reichenbach founded the so-called "Berlin Circle" (German: Die Gesellschaft für empirische Philosophie; English: Society for Empirical Philosophy). Among its members were Carl Gustav Hempel, Richard von Mises, David Hilbert and Kurt Grelling. The Vienna Circle manifesto lists 30 of Reichenbach's publications in a bibliography of closely related authors. In 1930 he and Rudolf Carnap began editing the journal Erkenntnis.

When Adolf Hitler became Chancellor of Germany in 1933, Reichenbach was immediately dismissed from his appointment at the Friedrich Wilhelm University of Berlin under the government's so called "Race Laws" due to his Jewish ancestry. Reichenbach himself did not practise Judaism, and his mother was a German Protestant, but he nevertheless suffered problems. He thereupon emigrated to Turkey, where he headed the department of philosophy at Istanbul University. He introduced interdisciplinary seminars and courses on scientific subjects, and in 1935 he published The Theory of Probability.

In 1938, with the help of Charles W. Morris, Reichenbach moved to the United States to take up a professorship at the University of California, Los Angeles in its Philosophy Department. Reichenbach helped establish UCLA as a leading philosophy department in the United States in the post-war period. Carl Hempel, Hilary Putnam, and Wesley Salmon were perhaps his most prominent students. During his time there, he published several of his most notable books, including Philosophic Foundations of Quantum Mechanics in 1944, Elements of Symbolic Logic in 1947, and The Rise of Scientific Philosophy (his most popular book) in 1951.

Reichenbach died unexpectedly of a heart attack on April 9, 1953. He was living in Los Angeles at the time, and had been working on problems in the philosophy of time and on the nature of scientific laws. As part of this he proposed a three part model of time in language, involving speech time, event time and — critically — reference time, which has been used by linguists since for describing tenses. This work resulted in two books published posthumously: The Direction of Time and Nomological Statements and Admissible Operations.

== Archives ==
Hans Reichenbach manuscripts, photographs, lectures, correspondence, drawings and other related materials are maintained by the Archives of Scientific Philosophy, Special Collections, University Library System, University of Pittsburgh. Much of the content has been digitized. Some more notable content includes:

- Correspondence to Nagel, 1934-1938
- Philosophy Congress
- Responses to Questionnaire
- Weyl's Extension of the Riemannian Concept of Space, Appendix

== Selected publications ==
- 1916. Der Begriff der Wahrscheinlichkeit für die mathematische Darstellung der Wirklichkeit (Ph.D. dissertation, University of Erlangen).
- 1920. Relativitätstheorie und Erkenntnis Apriori (habilitation thesis, Technische Hochschule Stuttgart). English translation: 1965. The theory of relativity and a priori knowledge. University of California Press.
- 1922. "Der gegenwärtige Stand der Relativitätsdiskussion." English translation: "The present state of the discussion on relativity" in Reichenbach (1959).
- 1924. Axiomatik der relativistischen Raum-Zeit-Lehre. English translation: 1969. Axiomatization of the theory of relativity. University of California Press.
- 1924. "Die Bewegungslehre bei Newton, Leibniz und Huyghens." English translation: "The theory of motion according to Newton, Leibniz, and Huyghens" in Reichenbach (1959).
- 1927. Von Kopernikus bis Einstein. Der Wandel unseres Weltbildes. English translation: 1942, From Copernicus to Einstein. Alliance Book Co.
- 1928. Philosophie der Raum-Zeit-Lehre. English translation: Maria Reichenbach, 1957, The Philosophy of Space and Time. Dover. ISBN 0-486-60443-8
- 1930. Atom und Kosmos. Das physikalische Weltbild der Gegenwart. English translation: 1932, Atom and cosmos: the world of modern physics. G. Allen & Unwin, Ltd.
- 1931. "Ziele und Wege der heutigen Naturphilosophie." English translation: "Aims and methods of modern philosophy of nature" in Reichenbach (1959).
- 1935. Wahrscheinlichkeitslehre: eine Untersuchung über die logischen und mathematischen Grundlagen der Wahrscheinlichkeitsrechnung. English translation: 1949, The theory of probability, an inquiry into the logical and mathematical foundations of the calculus of probability. University of California Press.
- 1938. Experience and prediction: an analysis of the foundations and the structure of knowledge. University of Chicago Press.
- 1942. From Copernicus to Einstein. Dover 1980: ISBN 0-486-23940-3
- 1944. Philosophic Foundations of Quantum Mechanics. University of California Press. Dover 1998: ISBN 0-486-40459-5
- 1947. Elements of Symbolic Logic. Dover 1980: ISBN 0-486-24004-5
- 1948. "Philosophy and physics" in Faculty research lectures, 1946. University of California Press.
- 1949. "The philosophical significance of the theory of relativity" in Schilpp, P. A., ed., Albert Einstein: philosopher-scientist. Evanston: The Library of Living Philosophers.
- 1951. The Rise of Scientific Philosophy. University of California Press. ISBN 978-0-520-01055-0
- 1954. Nomological statements and admissible operations. North Holland.
- 1956. The Direction of Time. University of California Press. Dover 1971. ISBN 0-486-40926-0
- 1959. Modern philosophy of science: Selected essays by Hans Reichenbach. Routledge & Kegan Paul. Greenwood Press 1981: ISBN 0-313-23274-1
- 1978. Selected writings, 1909–1953: with a selection of biographical and autobiographical sketches (Vienna circle collection). Dordrecht: Reidel. Springer paperback vol 1: ISBN 90-277-0292-6
- 1979. Hans Reichenbach, logical empiricist (Synthese library). Dordrecht: Reidel.
- 1991. Erkenntnis Orientated: A Centennial volume for Rudolf Carnap and Hans Reichenbach. Kluwer. Springer 2003: ISBN 0-7923-1408-5
- 1991. Logic, language, and the structure of scientific theories: proceedings of the Carnap-Reichenbach centennial, University of Konstanz, 21–24 May 1991. University of Pittsburgh Press.

== See also ==
- American philosophy

== Sources ==
- Adolf Grünbaum, 1963, Philosophical Problems of Space and Time. Alfred A. Knopf. Ch. 3.
- Günther Sandner, The Berlin Group in the Making: Politics and Philosophy in the Early Works of Hans Reichenbach and Kurt Grelling. Proceedings of 10th International Congress of the International Society for the History of Philosophy of Science (HOPOS), Ghent, July 2014. (Abstract.)
- Carl Hempel, 1991, Hans Reichenbach remembered, Erkenntnis 35: 5–10.
- Wesley Salmon, 1977, "The philosophy of Hans Reichenbach," Synthese 34: 5–88.
- Wesley Salmon (ed.), 1979, Hans Reichenbach: Logical Empiricist. Springer.
- Wesley Salmon, 1991, "Hans Reichenbach's vindication of induction," Erkenntnis 35: 99–122.
