= Richard Hönigswald =

American philosopher (1875–1947)

Richard Hönigswald (18 July 1875, Magyaróvár, Austria-Hungary – 11 June 1947, New Haven, Connecticut, US) was a Hungarian-born philosopher belonging to the wider circle of neo-Kantianism.

== Biography ==
Hönigswald was born in 1875 in Magyaróvár, Austria-Hungary (present-day Mosonmagyaróvár, Hungary).

He studied medicine and philosophy under Alois Riehl and Alexius von Meinong and from 1916 was professor of philosophy, psychology and pedagogy in Breslau (now Wrocław). There, he supervised Norbert Elias's doctorate up to its conclusion in 1924. He also influenced Hans-Georg Gadamer towards philosophy after the latter attended a seminar Hönigswald conducted on the philosophy of language. From 1930 he was a professor at the Ludwig-Maximilians-Universität München. The emphasis of his work lay on the theory of cognition from the point of view of validation and the philosophy of language. Beyond that, Hönigswald tried to develop a method of teaching that would be applicable to the natural sciences and the humanities equally. He also dealt with questions of the psychology of thought and of pedagogy.

In 1933, as a Jew, he was compulsorily retired after the Law for the Restoration of Professional Civil Service was passed in Germany. At the time of the Kristallnacht (The Night of Broken Glass) in 1938, he spent three weeks in Dachau concentration camp. In 1939, he emigrated with his wife and daughter by way of Switzerland to the United States.

He died in 1947 in New Haven, Connecticut, U.S.

The discovery of the collection of Hönigswald's unpublished writings led to the so-called third phase of neo-Kantianism (philosophy of language phase) after the phases launched by Hermann Cohen and Paul Natorp (epistemological phase) and Heinrich Rickert, Wilhelm Windelband, and Emil Lask (ontological-theoretical phase), respectively.

== Selected bibliography ==
- Ernst Haeckel, der monistische Philosoph : eine kritische Antwort auf seine "Welträthsel" (1900)
- Die Skepsis in Philosophie und Wissenschaft (1914)
- Die Philosophie des Altertums : problemgeschichtliche und systematische Untersuchungen (1917)
- Hobbes und die Staatsphilosophie (1924)
- Geschichte der erkenntnistheorie (1933)
- Philosophie und Sprache : Problemkritik und System (1937)
- Denker der italienischen renaissance : gestalten und probleme (1938)
- Erkenntnistheoretisches zur Schöpfungsgeschichte der Genesis (1939)
- Analysen und Probleme : Abhandlungen zur Philosophie und ihrer Geschichte (1959)
- Grundprobleme der Wissenschaftslehre : über die Struktur der Physik Kausalität (1965)
- Die Grundlagen der allgemeinen Methodenlehre (1969–1970)

== Sources ==
- Schmied-Kowarzik, Wolfdietrich (ed.), Erkennen - Monas - Sprache. Internationales Richard-Hönigswald-Symposion Kassel 1995 (Würzburg 1997).
- Zeidler, Kurt Walter, Kritische Dialektik und Transzendentalontologie. Der Ausgang des Neukantianismus und die post-neukantianische Systematik R. Hönigswalds, W. Cramers, B. Bauchs, H. Wagners, R. Reinigers und E. Heintels (Bonn 1995).
