= Bruno Bauch =

German philosopher

- Born: 19 January 1877; Groß-Nossen, Münsterberg District, Silesia, Prussia (present-day Poland)
- Died: 27 February 1942 (aged 65); Jena, Thuringia, Germany

Education
- Education: University of Freiburg (audit student; Ph.D., 1902); University of Strasbourg; Heidelberg University; University of Halle (Dr. phil. hab.)
- Thesis: Glückseligkeit und Persönlichkeit in der kritischen Ethik (Happiness and Personality in Critical Ethics) (1902)
- Doctoral advisor: Heinrich Rickert

Philosophical work
- Era: 20th-century philosophy
- Region: Western philosophy
- School: Neo-Kantianism (Baden school)
- Institutions: University of Halle; University of Jena
- Doctoral students: Rudolf Carnap
- Main interests: Epistemology, value theory
- Notable ideas: Fact–value distinction

Bruno Bauch (German: [baʊx]; 19 January 1877 – 27 February 1942) was a German philosopher. He was a neo-Kantian of the Baden school.

== Life and career ==
Bauch was born in Groß-Nossen, Münsterberg District, Silesia, Prussia (now in Poland) and studied philosophy at Freiburg, Strasbourg, and Heidelberg. In 1901, he received his doctorate under Heinrich Rickert at Freiburg, which entitled him to teach some courses (one of his doctoral students was Rudolf Carnap, who later became a central figure of the Vienna Circle). Bauch completed his habilitation, entitling him to a professorship, at the University of Halle in 1903. He taught as a "titular professor" at Halle from 1903 to 1910, and from 1911 onward as an "ordinary professor" at the University of Jena.

At Jena, he befriended Gottlob Frege and collaborated with the neo-Kantian philosopher of language Richard Hönigswald. Bauch was an influential figure in the Kant-Gesellschaft (Kant Society) and helped publish the Prussian Academy's edition of Kant's collected works. Until 1916, he was editor of the Kant Society's journal, Kant-Studien (Kant Studies). He was forced to resign after publishing an antisemitic article in a right-wing nationalist tabloid, which caused a storm of controversy in the Kant Society. (Many neo-Kantians, including Bauch's subsequent colleague Hönigswald, were Jewish, and quite a few were social democrats.)

In 1917, Bauch founded a philosophical society of his own, the German Philosophical Society, which issued the journal Beiträge zur Philosophie des Deutschen Idealismus (Contributions to the Philosophy of German Idealism). Frege was among its contributors. When the Nazis came to power, Bauch's political views stood him in good stead. While many neo-Kantians had to emigrate and some ended up in concentration camps (including, for a year, Hönigswald), Bauch became head of the German Philosophical Society in 1934.

== Philosophical work ==
Heinrich Rickert, whom Bauch studied under, was the most important leader of the so-called Baden school of neo-Kantianism after Wilhelm Windelband. Unlike its main rival, the Marburg school, the Baden neo-Kantians were more interested in practical philosophy than in the philosophy of science. They emphasized the distinction between fact and value and sought to use the concept of "value" for epistemological and ontological purposes. For example, to say that a sentence is "true" is sometimes equated with saying that it 'commands assent' (i.e., that it ought to be believed). Bauch, however, was a rather unorthodox scion of the Baden school, so much so that some commentators regard him as representing a distinct variety of neo-Kantianism.

While Bauch shared an interest in the value theory, he also had a much more lively interest in the philosophy of mathematics and logic than was common among the Baden neo-Kantians. Unlike Rickert, he was sympathetic to Gottlob Frege's logicism (which Rickert had rejected on the old-fashioned Kantian grounds that logic was analytic, mathematics synthetic), and was conciliatory toward the Marburg neo-Kantians' belief in the unity of logic and mathematics.

== Works (selection) ==
- Studien zur Philosophie der exakten Wissenschaften ("Studies on the Philosophy of the Exact Sciences"), Heidelberg, 1911.
- Wahrheit, Wert und Wirklichkeit ("Truth, Value and Actuality"), Leipzig, 1923.
