= Drobisch =

Drobisch is a surname. Notable people with the surname include:

- Karl Ludwig Drobisch (1803–1854), German composer, music theorist and church musician
- Klaus Drobisch (born 1931), German historian
- Moritz Wilhelm Drobisch (1802–1896), German mathematician, logician, psychologist and philosopher
- Till Drobisch (born 1993), Namibian racing cyclist

== See also ==
- Drobysh
