= Heinz Heimsoeth =

German historian (1886–1975)

Heinz Heimsoeth (German: [ˈhaɪ̯mzøːt]; 12 August 1886 – 10 September 1975) was a German historian of philosophy.

== Biography ==
He was born in Cologne. Heimsoeth began his studies at Heidelberg in 1905, but soon transferred to Berlin, where he studied with Wilhelm Dilthey, Alois Riehl, and Ernst Cassirer. Due to his interest in Kant he transferred in 1907 to Marburg, where he studied with Hermann Cohen and Paul Natorp. He graduated in 1911 with a thesis on Descartes. After a year studying in Paris with Henri Bergson he was habilitated with a thesis on Leibniz.

After two years teaching at Marburg, he was appointed Professor at the University of Königsberg in 1923. In 1931 he transferred to a chair in philosophy at Cologne.

After the Nazi seizure of power in 1933 Heimsoeth himself joined the Nazi Party and was named Dean of his faculty, a position he held again in 1943/44. He became Professor Emeritus in 1954. He died in Cologne.

== Works ==
- Die sechs großen Themen der abendländischen Metaphysik und der Ausgang des Mittelalters, Stilke, Berlin 1922, Nachdruck der unveränderten 3. Auflage, Wissenschaftliche Buchgesellschaft, Darmstadt 1987, ISBN 3-534-00076-5, translated into English as The Six Great Themes of Western Metaphysics and The End Of The Middle Ages, Wayne State University Press, 1994, ISBN 978-0-8143-2477-6
- Fichte, E. Reinhardt, München 1923
- Metaphysik der Neuzeit, München/Berlin 1934, Nachdruck Oldenboug, München 1967
- Geschichtsphilosophie, Bouvier, Bonn 1948
- Metaphysische Voraussetzungen und Antriebe in Nietzsches "Immoralismus", Steiner, Mainz 1955
- Windelband, Wilhelm: Lehrbuch der Geschichte der Philosophie. Mit einem Schlußkapitel "Die Philosophie im 20. Jahrhundert" und einer Übersicht über den Stand der philosophiegeschichtlichen Forschung, edited by Heinz Heimsoeth, Tübingen 1957, ISBN 3-16-838032-6
- Atom, Seele, Monade. Historische Ursprünge und Hintergründe von Kants Antinomie der Teilung, Steiner, Mainz 1960
- Studien zur Philosophiegeschichte, Kölner Universitätsverlag, Köln 1961
- Hegels Philosophie der Musik, Bouvier, Bonn 1964 (aus Hegel-Studien Bd. 2, 1963, S. 162 – 201)
- Transzendentale Dialektik. Ein Kommentar zu Kants Kritik der reinen Vernunft, 4 Bände, de Gruyter, Berlin 1966–71
- Studien zur Philosophie Immanuel Kants, Bouvier, Bonn 2. Aufl. 1971, ISBN 3-416-00437-X
- Nicolai Hartmann und Heinz Heimsoeth im Briefwechsel, Frida Hartmann & Renate Heimsoeth (Hrsg.), Bonn, 1978.
