= Ilse Rosenthal-Schneider =

German-Australian physicist and philosopher (1881–1990)

- Born: 25 April 1891; Finsterwalde, Brandenburg, German Empire
- Died: 6 February 1990 (aged 98); Sydney
- Education: University of Berlin, Germany
- Spouse: Hans S. A. Rosenthal (1890–1968) (m. 26 August 1922)
- Children: Stephanie
- Scientific career
- Fields: Physics, philosophy
- Workplaces: Germany, United Kingdom, University of Sydney, Australia
- Thesis: Die Beziehungen der Einsteinschen Relativitätstheorie zur Philosophie unter besonderer Berücksichtigung der Kantischen Lehre [The relationship of Einstein's theory of relativity to philosophy, with special reference to the Kantian doctrine (1920)
- Doctoral advisor: Alois Riehl, Max von Laue

Ilse Anna Marie Felicia Rosenthal-Schneider (25 April 1891 – 6 February 1990) was a German-Australian physicist and philosopher. She is best known for her collaboration and correspondence with the physicists Albert Einstein, Max von Laue, and Max Planck.

In the 1940s and 1950s, she exchanged a series of letters with Albert Einstein about philosophical aspects of physics, such as theory of relativity, fundamental constants and physical reality. She remained in contact with Einstein through correspondence until the death of Einstein in 1955. Rosenthal-Schneider contributed various articles and book reviews to the history of science journal Isis and the Australian Journal of Science.

== Life ==
Ilse Schneider was born on 25 April 1891 in Finsterwalde, Niederlausitz in Brandenburg and died on 6 February 1990 in Sydney, Australia. She was the daughter of Hermann Schneider (1852–1912), a district court judge, and Hedwig Friedmann (1860–1932). She had an older brother, Hans Samuel Gustav Johannes Schneider (born on 28 June 1889, died in Auschwitz in 1944).

The family belonged to the educated and well-established Prussian-German bourgeoisie. Rosenthal-Schneider grew up in Berlin, where she passed her “Abitur” at the Realgymnasium Charlottenburg (Berlin) in 1909. She began studying Philosophy and Physics at the Friedrich Wilhelm University in Berlin on 29 April 1909 and attended courses by Max Planck, Max von Laue, Heinrich Rubens, Ernst Cassirer, Alois Riehl, Eduard Spranger and Carl Stumpf, among others.

Rosenthal-Schneider earned a PhD in philosophy in 1920 at the University of Berlin, where she first met Albert Einstein. Her doctoral thesis was assessed and supervised by Alois Riehl (philosophy) and Max von Laue (physics). Albert Einstein was closely involved in the process. He had many conversations and discussions with her beforehand and strongly supported her dissertation. The doctoral examination took place on 29 July 1920. The examiners were Max von Laue (physics), Alois Riehl (philosophy), Eduard Spranger (education) and Eduard Norden (Greek). Ilse Schneider’s application for exemption from the compulsory examination in Greek at the Faculty of Philosophy at the time, dated 24 October 1919, was rejected by the Dean's Office, although Alois Riehl emphatically supported Ilse Schneider's application in a letter dated 29 October 1919. The title of the doctoral thesis was: ‘The relationship of Einstein's theory of relativity to philosophy with special consideration of Kant's doctrine.’ Max von Laue recommended the thesis to the Springer publishing house (publisher at the time: Arnold Berliner). It was published in 1921 under the title Das Raum-Zeit-Problem bei Kant und Einstein.

On 26 August 1922, Rosenthal-Schneider married Hans Samuel Arthur Rosenthal (1890-1968), an electrical engineer of Jewish descent. The couple's daughter Stephanie (Hedwig Magda Dorothea Stephanie) was born on 13 June 1923. Little is known about her professional and academic career after her marriage. As a freelance journalist, she wrote short articles on current developments in physics, including for the Vossische Zeitung in Berlin.

In 1938, Rosenthal-Schneider emigrated to Australia with her husband and daughter, five years after Hitler's National Socialist Party came to power. The journey took them on the RMMS AORANGI, a transpacific ocean liner, via Canada to Sydney. The family arrived in Sydney on 1 July 1938. The family settled in the eastern suburb of Sydney, Vaucluse, and a year later bought a property at 48 Cambridge Avenue. In the following years, Rosenthal-Schneider gave a series of lectures on scientific and philosophical topics, was involved in a project to bring academic knowledge from the large coastal cities to the rural areas of the country, and published articles in the Australian Journal of Science and other scientific journals.

Rosenthal-Schneider's hopes for a permanent position at the University of Sydney were not realized. While her husband Hans found a permanent position as Senior Lecturer in the School of Electrical Engineering at the Faculty of Engineering of the University of New South Wales, Rosenthal-Schneider only got precarious casual jobs for the rest of his life. Rosenthal-Schneider initially taught at a public school in Hopewood House, Darling Point. From 1944, she offered the ‘Science German’ course, which was organized by the so-called ‘Extension Board’, an institution of the University of Sydney for adult education. In addition to her work for the Extension Board, she became a part-time tutor in the German department at the University of Sydney and taught history and philosophy of science from 1945 until her retirement on 8 June 1952.

Rosenthal-Schneider died in Sydney on 6 February 1990 at the age of 98. Both her commitment and her publications from her time of emigration bear witness to the attempt to anchor a philosophy of science in Australia. At the same time, her essays are a contemporary document of the social and political relevance of physics in the post-war period and the necessity of philosophical-critical reflection.

== Notable works ==
- Rosenthal-Schneider, Ilse (1943). “The Scientist as Philosopher.” Australian Journal of Science 5/6, pp. 194–196.
- Rosenthal-Schneider, Ilse (1945). “The Scientist's Interference With the Things He Studies.” Australian Journal of Science 7, pp. 166–169.
- Rosenthal-Schneider, Ilse (1946). “The Laws of Nature in the Light of Modern Physics and Biology.” Australian Journal of Science 8, pp. 120–123.
- Rosenthal-Schneider, Ilse (1947). “The Interpretation of Scientific Evidence.” Australian Journal of Science 9/5, pp. 161–166.
- Rosenthal-Schneider, Ilse (1947/48). “Science at the Cross Roads (review).” Australian Journal of Science 10, p. 62.
- Rosenthal-Schneider, Ilse (1948). “Obituary: Max Planck.” Australian Journal of Science 10/4, pp. 105–106.
- Rosenthal-Schneider, Ilse (1948). “Review: Geschichte der Physik by Max v. Laue.” Isis 38, pp. 258–260.
- Rosenthal-Schneider, Ilse (1949). “Presuppositions and anticipations in Einstein's physics.” Albert Einstein: Philosopher-Scientist. Ed. by Paul Arthur Schilpp. Vol. 1, pp. 129–146.
- Rosenthal-Schneider, Ilse (1949). “Review: Wissenschaftliche Selbstbiographie by Max Planck.” Isis 40, pp. 67–69.
- Rosenthal-Schneider, Ilse (1950). “Gottfried Wilhelm Leibniz. Vorträge der aus Anlass seines 300. Geburtstages in Hamburg abgehaltenen wissenschaftlichen Tagung (Book Review).” Isis 41.3/4, pp. 310–313.
- Rosenthal-Schneider, Ilse (1952). “Limits in modern physics and their epistemological implications.” Australian Journal of Science 15, pp. 77–80.
- Rosenthal-Schneider, Ilse (1954). “Einstein, at 75, is still seeking eternal truths.” Sydney Morning Herald, Mar. 13, 1954, p. 2.
- Rosenthal-Schneider, Ilse (1955). “Albert Einstein: 14 March 1879 – 18 April 1955.” Australian Journal of Science 18, pp. 15–20.
- Rosenthal-Schneider, Ilse (1960). “Obituary: Max von Laue.” Australian Journal of Science 23/2, pp. 42–43.
- Rosenthal-Schneider, Ilse (1980). “Reminiscences of Einstein.” Some Strangeness in the Proportions: a Centennial Symposium to Celebrate the Achievements of Albert Einstein. Ed. by Harry Woolf, pp. 521–523.
- Rosenthal-Schneider, Ilse (1980). Reality and Scientific Truth: Discussions with Einstein, von Laue, and Planck, ed. by Thomas Braun. Detroit: Wayne State University Press.
- Ilse Rosenthal-Schneider (1 January 1980). Thomas Braun (ed.). Reality and Scientific Truth: Discussions With Einstein, Von Laue, and Planck (Records and correspondence). Wayne State University Press, 1980. original from the University of Michigan. ISBN 9780814316504. OCLC 6222962.
- Ilse Rosenthal-Schneider (1988). Begegnungen mit Einstein, von Laue und Planck : Realität und wissenschaftliche Wahrheit (in German). Braunschweig; Wiesbaden : Vieweg, cop. 1988. ISBN 9783528089702. OCLC 64797021.
- Rosenthal-Schneider, I. (1988). Begegnungen mit Einstein, von Laue und Planck: Realität und wissenschaftliche Wahrheit. Braunschweig: Vieweg.
- Schneider, Ilse (1914). “Raum, Zeit und ihre Relativität bei Poincaré.” Herrn Geheimrat Professor Dr. phil. et H.LL. D. Alois Riehl zum siebzigsten Geburtstag. Kleine Abhandlungen von Schülern seines Seminars. Berlin: Verlag H. Lonys, pp. 91–130.
- Schneider, Ilse (1920a). “Die Beziehungen der Einsteinschen Relativitätstheorie zur Philosophie unter besonderer Berücksichtigung der Kantischen Lehre.” Phil. Diss. Berlin: Friedrich–Wilhelms-Universität Berlin.
- Schneider, Ilse (1921a). Das Raum-Zeit-Problem bei Kant und Einstein. Berlin: Springer.
- Schneider, Ilse (1921b). “Philosophisches über Einsteins Theorie. Betrachtungen zum Buch des Philosophen Ernst Cassirer Zur Einsteinschen Relativitätstheorie.” Deutsche Allgemeine Zeitung (Beilage).
- Schneider, Ilse (1949). “Presuppositions and Anticipations in Einstein's Physics.” Albert Einstein: Philosopher-Scientist. Ed. by Paul Arthur Schilpp. 3rd ed. Reprint, La Salle, Ill.: Open Court 1970. Evanston, Ill.: Library of Living Philosophers, pp. 60–73.
- Schneider, Ilse (1955). “Voraussetzungen und Erwartungen in Einsteins Physik.” Albert Einstein als Philosoph und Naturforscher. Ed. by Paul Arthur Schilpp. Stuttgart: Kohlhammer, pp. 60–73.
- Ilse Rosenthal-Schneider. Das Raum-Zeit-Problem bei Kant und Einstein (in German). Berlin : Springer, 1921. OCLC 749766417.
- Ilse Rosenthal-Schneider. Presuppositions and anticipations in Einstein's physics. New York, NY, 1949. OCLC 315045254.
- Ilse Rosenthal-Schneider. Albert Einstein : 14 March 1879 – 18 April 1955. Sydney, 1955. OCLC 315045356.
- Rosenthal-Schneider, Ilse (1980). "Reminiscenses of Einstein". In Woolf, Harry (ed.). Some Strangeness in the Proportion. Addison-Wesley Publishing Company, Reading, Massachusetts. p. 521. Bibcode:1980ssp..conf..521R.

== Quote of a discussion with Albert Einstein, November 1919 ==
Plötzlich unterbrach Einstein die Lektüre and übergab mir ein Telegramm, das er vom Fensterbrett genommen hatte, mit den Worten: "Dies könnte Sie interessieren." Es war ein Telegramm von Eddington mit den Resultaten der berühmten Expedition zur Sonnenfinsternis. Voll von Begeisterung rief ich aus: "Wie wunderbar, dies ist fast der Wert, den Sie berechnet haben." Völlig ruhig bemerkte er: "Ich wusste, dass die Theorie richtig ist. Haben Sie daran gezweifelt?" Ich antwortete: "Nein, natürlich nicht. Doch was hätten Sie gesagt, wenn die Bestätigung nicht so ausgefallen wäre?" Er antwortete: "Da könnt' mir halt der liebe Gott leid tun, die Theorie stimmt doch." Hier verwendetete er - wie so oft - das Wort "Gott" statt "Natur".

— Begegnungen mit Einstein, von Laue und Planck: Realität und wissenschaftliche Wahrheit, p. 60, Springer-Verlag, 13.03.2013
Translation:

- Suddenly Einstein stopped reading and handed me a telegram he had picked up from the window sill, saying, "You might be interested in this." It was a telegram from Eddington with the results of the famous eclipse expedition. Full of excitement, I exclaimed, "How wonderful, this is almost the value you calculated." Completely calm, he remarked, "I knew the theory was correct. Did you doubt it?" I replied, "No, of course not. But what would you have said if the confirmation hadn't been so?" He replied: "I could just feel sorry for dear God, the theory is correct." Here he used - as so often - the word "God" instead of "nature".

== Primary sources ==
- Ilse Rosenthal-Schneider; Albert Einstein. Rosenthal-Schneider Collection (Records and correspondence). University of New South Wales: 1931–1954. OCLC 222709357.
