= Nicolai Hartmann =

German philosopher (1882–1950)

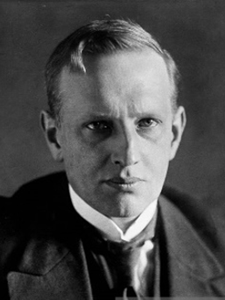
- Born: 20 February [O.S. 8 February] 1882; Riga, Livonia Governorate, Russian Empire
- Died: 9 October 1950 (aged 68); Göttingen, Landkreis Göttingen, Lower Saxony, West Germany
- Spouses: Alexandra Stephanitz (m. 1911; div. 1926) Frida Rosenfeld (m. 1929; died 1950)
- Children: 3

Education
- Education: University of Yuryev; Saint Petersburg University; University of Marburg
- Doctoral advisor: Hermann Cohen; Paul Natorp

Philosophical work
- Era: 20th-century philosophy
- Region: Western philosophy
- School: Continental philosophy Neo-Kantianism (early); Realist phenomenology (late); Critical realism (late)
- Institutions: University of Marburg; University of Cologne; University of Berlin; University of Göttingen
- Doctoral students: Jacob Klein; Carl Gustav Hempel
- Notable students: Hans-Georg Gadamer
- Main interests: Metaphysics, epistemology, ethics
- Notable ideas: Strata of Being (Seinsschichten), new ontology (neue Ontologie), categorial novum

Paul Nicolai Hartmann (German: [ˈhaʁtman]; 20 February 1882 – 9 October 1950) was a German philosopher. He is regarded as a key representative of critical realism and as one of the most important twentieth-century metaphysicians. His early work in the philosophy of biology has been cited in modern discussions of genomics and cloning.

== Biography ==
Hartmann was born a Baltic German in Riga, which was then the capital of the Governorate of Livonia in the Russian Empire, and which is now in Latvia. He was the son of the engineer Carl August Hartmann and his wife Helene, born Hackmann. He attended from 1897 the German-language high school in Saint Petersburg. In the years 1902–03 he studied Medicine at the Imperial University of Yuryev (now Tartu), and 1903–05 classical philology and philosophy at the Saint Petersburg Imperial University with his friend Vasily Sesemann. In 1905 he went to the University of Marburg, where he studied with the neo-Kantians Hermann Cohen and Paul Natorp. In Marburg began a lifelong friendship with Heinz Heimsoeth. In 1907 he received his doctorate from Marburg with the thesis Das Seinsproblem in der griechischen Philosophie vor Plato (The Problem of Being in Greek Philosophy Before Plato). In 1909 he published the book Platos Logik des Seins (The Logic of Being in Plato). The same year he completed his habilitation on Proclus: Des Proklus Diadochus philosophische Anfangsgründe der Mathematik (Proclus Diadochus' Philosophical Elements of Mathematics).

In 1911, Hartmann married Alice Stepanitz, with whom he had a daughter, Dagmar, in 1912. In 1912 he published Die philosophischen Grundfragen der Biologie (The Philosophical Foundations of Biology). From 1914 to 1918 he did military service as an interpreter, letter censor, and intelligence officer. In 1919, i.e., after the war, he received a position as Privatdozent in Marburg. Around this time he met Martin Heidegger. In 1920 he became Associate Professor (außerordentlicher Professor) and in 1921 appeared the work that established him as an independent philosophical thinker, Grundzüge einer Metaphysik der Erkenntnis (Foundation of a Metaphysics of Knowledge). The following year he became Full Professor (ordentlicher Professor) as successor of the Chair held by Natorp. In 1925, he moved to Cologne, where he came into contact with Max Scheler. In 1926 he published Ethik, his second major work, in which he develops a material value ethics akin to that of Scheler. The same year he divorced from his wife.

In 1929, Hartmann married Frida Rosenfeld, with whom he had a son, Olaf (1930), and a daughter, Lise (1932). In 1931, he became Professor of Theoretical Philosophy I at the University of Berlin. He held the chair until 1945. During this time he successively published many pieces of his ontology: Das Problem des geistigen Seins (The Problem of Spiritual Being) (1933), Zur Grundlegung der Ontologie (On the Foundation of Ontology) (1935), Möglichkeit und Wirklichkeit (Possibility and Actuality) (1938) and Der Aufbau der realen Welt. Grundriß der allgemeinen Kategorienlehre (The Structure of the Real World. Outline of the General Theory of Categories) (1940).

The unrest of the Nazi era seems to have left Hartmann relatively undisturbed in his task of developing a new ontology. In the "SD-Dossiers über Philosophie-Professoren" (i.e. SD-files concerning philosophy professors) that were set up by the SS Security Service (SD) Nicolai Hartmann was classified from an SS-point of view in the following way: "has always been a nationalist. Loyal to National Socialism, too, without political activity, but a social attitude has to be acknowledged. (Cf. donations to the NSV and hosting children during school vacations.)".

In 1942, Hartmann edited a volume entitled Systematische Philosophie, in which he contributed the essay Neue Wege der Ontologie (New Ways of Ontology), which summarizes his work in ontology. Between 1945 and 1950, Hartmann taught at the University of Göttingen.

He died of a stroke in 1950. In the year of his death, he published Philosophie der Natur (Philosophy of Nature). His works Teleologisches Denken (Teleological Thinking) (1951) and Ästhetik (Aesthetics) (1953) were published posthumously.

== Legacy ==
Nicolai Hartmann is regarded as an important representative of critical realism and as one of the major metaphysicians of the twentieth century. Reception of his philosophy has been impaired by a general anti-ontology trend in secular philosophy before and after WW2, as well as by the complexity of his philosophical terminology (intentio obliqua, cf. intentio secunda). Wolfgang Stegmüller's 1969 book Main Currents in Contemporary German, British, and American Philosophy has a chapter on Hartmann. Paul Feyerabend had presented Hartmann's philosophy of nature in Ratio (parallel editions in German and English, 1963).

Hartmann had many students, however, among them Boris Pasternak, Hans-Georg Gadamer, Emil Cioran, Jakob Klein, Delfim Santos and Max Wehrli. He is the modern discoverer of emergence—originally called by him categorial novum. His encyclopedic work is somewhat forgotten today, although famous during his lifetime. His early work in the philosophy of biology has been cited in modern discussions of genomics and cloning, and his views on consciousness and free will are currently in vogue among contributors to the Journal of Consciousness Studies.

== Ontology ==
Nicolai Hartmann equates ontology with Aristotle's science of being qua being. This science involves studying the most general characteristics of entities, usually referred to as categories, and the relations between them. According to Hartmann, the most general categories are:

1. Moments of being (Seinsmomente): existence (Dasein) and essence (Sosein)
2. Modes of being (Seinsweisen): reality and ideality
3. Modalities of being (Seinsmodi): possibility, actuality and necessity

=== Existence and essence ===
The existence of an entity constitutes the fact that this entity is there, that it exists. Essence, on the other hand, constitutes what this entity is like, what its characteristics are. Every entity has both of these modes of being. But, as Hartmann points out, there is no absolute difference between existence and essence. For example, the existence of a leaf belongs to the essence of the tree, while the existence of the tree belongs to the essence of the forest.

=== Reality and ideality ===
Reality and ideality are two disjunctive categories: every entity is either real or ideal. Ideal entities are universal, returnable and always existing while real entities are individual, unique and destructible. Among the ideal entities are mathematical objects and values. Reality is made up of a chain of temporal events. Reality is obtrusive; it is often experienced as a form of resistance in contrast to ideality.

=== Modalities of being ===
The modalities of being are divided into the absolute modalities (actuality and non-actuality) and the relative modalities (possibility, impossibility and necessity). The relative modalities are relative in the sense that they depend on the absolute modalities: something is possible, impossible or necessary because something else is actual. Hartmann analyzes modality in the real sphere in terms of necessary conditions. An entity becomes actual if all its necessary conditions obtain. If all these factors obtain, it is necessary that the entity exists. But as long as one of its factors is missing, it can't become actual; it is impossible. This has the consequence that all positive and all the negative modalities fall together: whatever is possible is both actual and necessary, whatever is not necessary is both non-actual and impossible. This is true also in the ideal sphere, where possibility is given by being free from contradictions.

=== Levels of reality ===
In Hartmann's ontological theory, the levels of reality are: (1) the inorganic level (German: anorganische Schicht), (2) the organic level (organische Schicht), (3) the psychical/emotional level (seelische Schicht) and (4) the intellectual/cultural level (geistige Schicht). In The Structure of the Real World (Der Aufbau der realen Welt), Hartmann postulates four laws that apply to the levels of reality.

1. The law of recurrence: Lower categories recur in the higher levels as a subaspect of higher categories, but never vice versa.
2. The law of modification: The categorial elements modify in their recurrence in the higher levels (they are shaped by the characteristics of the higher levels).
3. The law of the novum: The higher category is composed of a diversity of lower elements, but it is a specific novum that is not included in the lower levels.
4. The law of distance between levels: Since the different levels do not develop continuously but in leaps, they can be clearly distinguished.

== Ethical theory ==
The central concept of Hartmann's ethical theory is that of a value. Hartmann's 1926 book, Ethik, elaborates a material ethics of value according to which moral knowledge is achieved through phenomenological investigation into our experiences of values. Moral phenomena are understood by Hartmann to be experiences of a realm of being which is distinct from that of material things, namely, the realm of values. The values inhabiting this realm are unchanging, supertemporal, and superhistorical, though human consciousness of them shifts in focus over time. Borrowing a style of phrase from Kant, Hartmann characterizes values as conditions of the possibility of goods; in other words, values are what make it possible for situations in the world to be good. Our knowledge of the goodness (or badness) of situations is derived from our emotional experiences of them, experiences which are made possible by an a priori capacity for the appreciation of value. For Hartmann, this means that our awareness of the value of a state of affairs is not arrived at through a process of reasoning, but rather, by way of an experience of feeling, which he calls valuational consciousness. If, then, ethics is the study of what one ought to do, or what states of affairs one ought to bring about, such studies, according to Hartmann, must be carried out by paying close attention to our emotional capacities to discern what is valuable in the world. As such, Hartmann's conception of proper moral philosophy contrasts with rationalist and formalist theories, such as Kant's, according to which ethical knowledge is derived from purely rational principles.

== Works ==
=== Works in German ===
Books

- 1909, Des Proklus Diadochus philosophische Anfangsgründe der Mathematik, Töpelmann, Gießen.
- 1909, Platos Logik des Seins, Töpelmann, Gießen.
- 1912, Philosophische Grundfragen der Biologie, Vandenhoeck & Ruprecht, Göttingen.
- 1921, Grundzüge einer Metaphysik der Erkenntnis, Vereinigung wissenschaftlichen. Verleger, Berlin.
- 1923, Die Philosophie des deutschen Idealismus 1: Fichte, Schelling und die Romantik, de Gruyter, Berlin.
- 1926, Ethik, de Gruyter, Berlin and Leipzig.
- 1929, Die Philosophie des deutschen Idealismus 2: Hegel, de Gruyter, Berlin.
- 1931, Zum Problem der Realitätsgegebenheit, Pan-Verlagsgesellschaft, Berlin.
- 1933, Das Problem des geistigen Seins. Untersuchungen zur Grundlegung der Geschichtsphilosophie und der Geisteswissenschaften, de Gruyter, Berlin and Leipzig.
- 1935, Ontologie, (4 Volumes) I: Zur Grundlegung der Ontologie, de Gruyter, Berlin and Leipzig.
- 1938, II: Möglichkeit und Wirklichkeit, de Gruyter, Berlin.
- 1940, III: Der Aufbau der realen Welt: Grundriß d. allg. Kategorienlehre , de Gruyter, Berlin.
- 1942, Systematische Philosophie, Kohlhammer Verlag, Stuttgart & Berlin.
- 1943, Neue Wege der Ontologie, Kohlhammer Verlag, Stuttgart.
- 1949, Einführung in die Philosophie, Luise Hanckel Verlag, Hannover.
- 1950, IV: Philosophie der Natur : Abriss der speziellen Kategorienlehre, de Gruyter, Berlin.
- 1951, Teleologisches Denken, de Gruyter, Berlin.
- 1953, Asthetik, de Gruyter, Berlin.
- 1954, Philosophische Gespräche, Vandenhoeck & Ruprecht, Göttingen.
- 1955, Der philosophische Gedanke und seine Geschichte, Zeitlichkeit und Substantialität, Sinngebung und Sinnerfüllung, de Gruyter, Berlin.
- 1955, Kleinere Schriften; *Bd. 1* Abhandlungen zur systematischen Philosophie, de Gruyter, Berlin.
- 1957, Kleinere Schriften; *Bd. 2* Abhandlungen zur Philosophie-Geschichte, de Gruyter, Berlin.
- 1958, Kleinere Schriften; *Bd. 3* Vom Neukantianismus zur Ontologie, de Gruyter, Berlin.

Articles

- 1924, Diesseits von Idealismus und Realismus : Ein Beitrag zur Scheidg d. Geschichtl. u. Übergeschichtl. in d. Kantischen Philosophie in: Sonderdrucke der Kantischen Studien, Pan Verlag R. Heise Berlin, pp. 160–206.
- 1926, Aristoteles und Hegel, Beitrage zur Philosophie des Deutschen Idealismus, 3 (1923), pp. 1–36.
- 1927, "Über die Stellung der ästhetischen Werte im Reich der Werte überhaupt", in Proceedings of the Sixth International Congress of Philosophy, Edgar Sheffield Brightman (ed.), New York: Longmans, Green, and Co, pp. 428–36.
- 1933, Systematische Selbstdarstellung in: Deutsche systematische Philosophie nach ihren Gestaltern, Ebda, Berlin : Junker & Dünnhaupt, pp. 283–340.
- 1935, Das Problem des Apriorismus in der Platonischen Philosophie in: Sitzungsberichte d. Preuss. Akad. d. Wiss. Phil.-hist. Kl. 1935, 15, de Gruyter, Berlin.
- 1936, Der philosophische Gedanke und seine Geschichte, in: Abhandlungen d. Preuss. Akad. d. Wissenschaften. Phil.-hist. Kl. 1936, Nr 5, de Gruyter, Berlin.
- 1937, Der megarische und der Aristotelische Möglichkeitsbegriff : Ein Beitr. zur Geschichte d. ontolog. Modalitätsproblems, in; Sitzungsberichte d. Preuss. Akad. d. Wiss. Phil.-hist. Kl. 1937, 10, de Gruyter, Berlin.
- 1938, Heinrich Maiers Beitrag zum Problem der Kategorien, in: Sitzungsberichte d. Preuss. Akad. d. Wiss. Phil.-hist. Kl. 1938, de Gruyter, Berlin.
- 1939, Aristoteles und das Problem des Begriffs, in: Abhandlungen der Preussischen Akademie der Wissenschaften : Philosophisch-historische Klasse; Jg. 1939, Nr 5, de Gruyter, Berlin.
- 1941, “Zur Lehre vom Eidos bei Platon und Aristoteles”, in: Abhandlungen d. Preuss. Akad. d. Wiss. Phil.-hist. Kl. Jg. 1941, Nr 8, de Gruyter, Berlin.
- 1942, Neue Wege der Ontologie, in: Systematische Philosophie, N. Hartmann, editor, Stuttgart.
- 1943, Die Anfänge des Schichtungsgedankens in der alten Philosophie, in: Abhandlungen der Preußischen Akademie der Wissenschaften : Philosophisch-historische Klasse; Jg. 1943, Nr 3, De Gruyter, Berlin.
- 1946, Leibniz als Metaphysiker, de Gruyter, Berlin.

=== Translations in English ===
- Nicolai Hartmann, Ethics, London: George Allen & Unwin 1932. Reprinted with a new introduction by Andreas A. M. Kinneging – New Brunswick, Transaction Publishers, 2002–04 in three volumes: I. Moral phenomena (2002); II. Moral values (2004); III. Moral freedom (2004).
- Nicolai Hartmann, "German Philosophy in the Last Ten Years", translated by John Ladd, Mind: A Quarterly Review of Psychology and Philosophy, vol. 58, no. 232, 1949, pp. 413–33.
- Nicolai Hartmann, New Ways of Ontology, Westport: Greenwood Press, 1952 (Reprinted with a new introduction by P. Cicovacki, Transaction Publishers, 2012).
- Nicolai Hartmann, "How Is Critical Ontology Possible? Toward the Foundation of the General Theory of the Categories, Part One", translated from "Wie ist kritische Ontologie überhaupt möglich?" (1924) by Keith R. Peterson, Axiomathes, vol. 22, 2012, pp. 315–54.
- Nicolai Hartmann, Possibility and Actuality. Berlin: Walter de Gruyter, 2013 (Translation by Alex Scott and Stephanie Adair of Möglichkeit und Wirklichkeit, 1938).
- Nicolai Hartmann, Aesthetics. Berlin: Walter de Gruyter, 2014 (Translation by Eugene Kelly of Ästhetik, 1953).
- Nicolai Hartmann, "The Megarian and the Aristotelian Concept of Possibility: A Contribution to the History of the Ontological Problem of Modality". Axiomathes, 2017 (Translation by Frederic Tremblay and Keith R. Peterson of "Der Megarische und der Aristotelische Möglichkeitsbegriff: ein Beitrag zur Geschichte des ontologischen Modalitätsproblems", 1937).
- Nicolai Hartmann, "Max Scheler", translated by Frederic Tremblay, in Nicolai Hartmanns Neue Ontologie und die Philosophische Anthropologie: Menschliches Leben in Natur und Geist, edited by Moritz Kalckreuth, Gregor Schmieg, Friedrich Hausen, Berlin: Walter de Gruyter, 2019, pp. 263–72.
- Nicolai Hartmann, Ontology: Laying the Foundations, Translation and Introduction by Keith R. Peterson, Berlin: De Gruyter, 2019.

== See also ==
- Supervenience
