= Drobysh =

Drobysh (Russian: Дробыш) is a surname. Notable people with the surname include:

- Maksim Drobysh (born 2001), Belarusian footballer
- Viktor Drobysh (born 1966), Russian composer and music producer

== See also ==
- Drobisch
