= Relationship of Friedrich Nietzsche and Max Stirner =

Comparison of their ideas

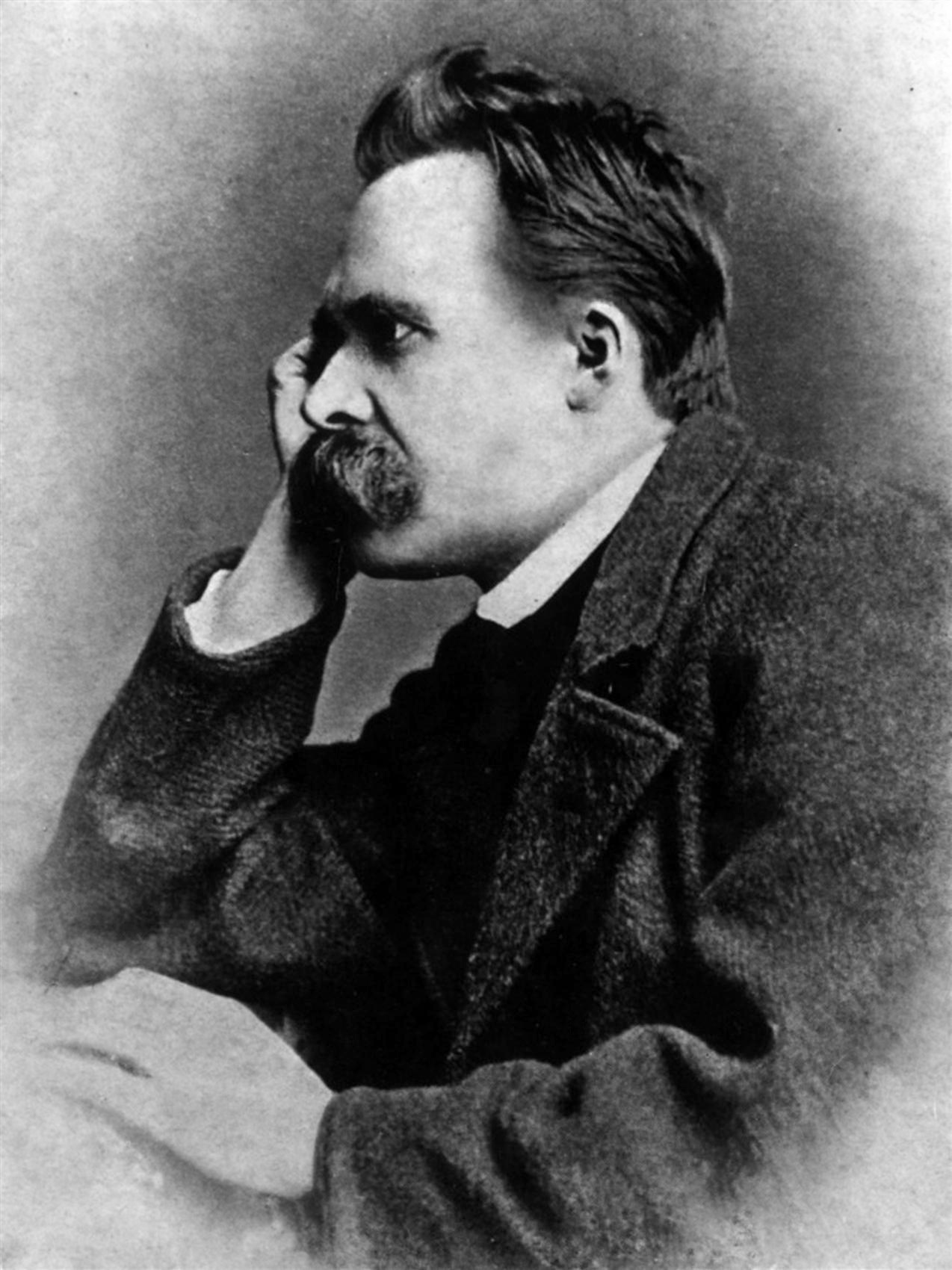
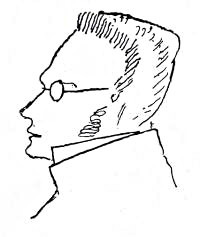
The philosophers Friedrich Nietzsche (left) and Max Stirner (right)

The ideas of the 19th century German philosophers Max Stirner (dead in 1856) and Friedrich Nietzsche (born in 1844) have been compared frequently. Many authors have discussed apparent similarities in their writings, sometimes raising the question of influences. In Germany, during the early years of Nietzsche's emergence as a well-known figure, the only thinker who was discussed in relation to his ideas more often than Stirner was Arthur Schopenhauer. It is certain that Nietzsche read about Stirner's book The Ego and Its Own (Der Einzige und sein Eigentum, 1845), which was mentioned in Friedrich Albert Lange's History of Materialism and Critique of its Present Importance (1866) and Eduard von Hartmann's Philosophy of the Unconscious (1869), both of which young Nietzsche knew well. However, there is no irrefutable indication that he actually read it as no mention of Stirner is known to exist anywhere in Nietzsche's publications, papers or correspondence.

Yet, as soon as Nietzsche's work began to reach a wider audience, the question of whether or not he owed a debt of influence to Stirner was raised. As early as 1891 (while Nietzsche was still alive, though incapacitated by mental illness), Eduard von Hartmann went so far as to suggest that he had plagiarized Stirner. By the turn of the century, the belief that Nietzsche had been influenced by Stirner was so widespread that it became something of a commonplace, at least in Germany. It prompted one observer to note their similarities in 1907.

Nevertheless, from the beginning of what was characterized as "great debate" regarding Stirner's possible influence on Nietzsche — positive or negative — serious problems with the idea were apparent. By the middle of the 20th century, if Stirner was mentioned at all in works on Nietzsche, the idea of influence was repeatedly dismissed outright or abandoned as unanswerable.

However, the idea that Nietzsche was influenced in some way by Stirner continues to attract a vocal minority, ostensibly motivated by a need to explain in some reasonable fashion the often-noted (though arguably superficial) similarities in their writings. In any case, the most prominent problems with the theory of Stirner's influence on Nietzsche are not limited to the difficulty in establishing whether one man knew of or read the other. They also include establishing precisely how and why Stirner, in particular, might have been a meaningful influence on a man as widely read as Nietzsche.

== Period suggestions of influence and possible links to Stirner ==
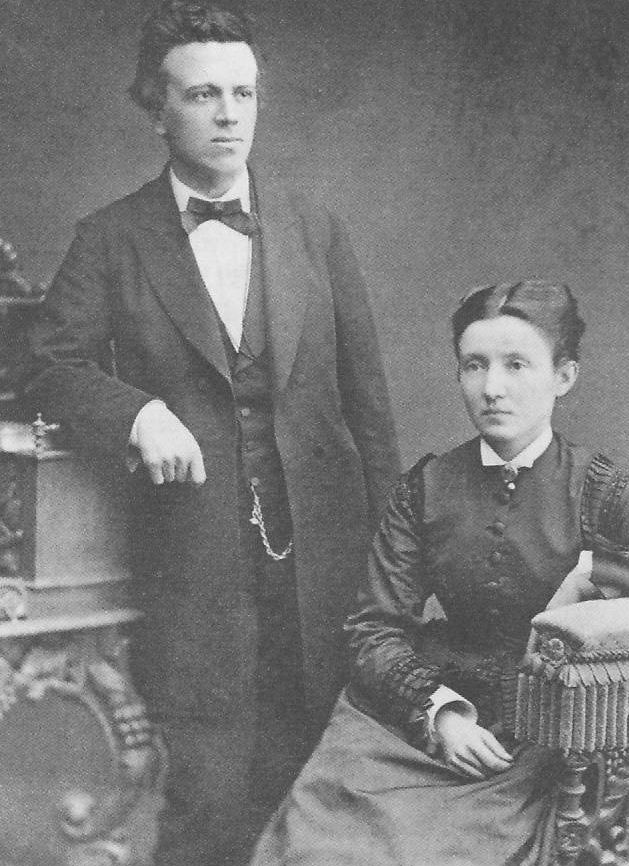
Franz and Ida Overbeck, two close friends of Nietzsche's who indicated he had been influenced by Stirner

The origin of the debate surrounding whether or not Nietzsche had read Stirner's work — and if so, whether he had been influenced by him — seems to lie in apparent similarities between the ideas of the two men as expressed in their writing. These similarities were recognized early and led many, for a variety of reasons, to attempt to determine the precise nature of any possible relationship.

Eduard von Hartmann's book The Philosophy of the Unconscious had been attacked by Nietzsche in the second of his Untimely Meditations. In 1891, Hartmann claimed that Nietzsche must have been aware of Stirner because Stirner was treated in the very book by him which Nietzsche subjected to criticism. As mentioned, Hartmann accused Nietzsche of having plagiarized Stirner. Nietzsche is also known to have read Lange's History of Materialism, where Stirner's book The Ego and Its Own is referred to briefly as "the most extreme, that we have knowledge of". Lange goes on to refer to the "ill fame" of Stirner's book. Nietzsche knew these works by Hartmann and Lange very well.

Paul Lauterbach also appears to have played a role in the origin of the association of the two thinkers. Lauterbach was a close friend of Heinrich Köselitz (Peter Gast, who was for many years a kind of private secretary for Nietzsche). Lauterbach came to know Nietzsche's work through Köselitz, and was among the philosopher's earliest admirers. He also worked hard to revive Stirner. According to one view this was a part of his project to present Nietzsche as "the great successor, developer and creative transformer" of Stirner. He edited and wrote an introduction to the 1893 Reclam Edition of Stirner with this in mind. Discussing the book, he wrote that his introductory chapter was intended to protect readers from Stirner's book with Nietzsche's assistance. This introduction appeared in all Reclam editions of The Ego and Its Own from 1893 to 1924.

Franz Overbeck, who was one of Nietzsche's closest friends, went through the records of the Basle university library and was able to confirm what Nietzsche's erstwhile favourite student Adolf Baumgartner had claimed, namely that once he had borrowed Stirner's book (on 14 July 1874) "on Nietzsche's warmest recommendations". Albert Levy independently confirmed that Baumgartner made the claim and that Baumgartner had borrowed the book. Franz Overbeck's wife Ida reported that during the period from 1880 to 1883 Nietzsche lived with the couple at several points and that he mentioned Stirner directly. She describes a discussion she had with Nietzsche in which he mentioned an affinity with Stirner and defensively confided that others might accuse him of plagiarism.

Resa von Schirnhofer said that Nietzsche's sister had repeatedly pressed her in 1897 about whether she had discussed Stirner's The Individual and His Property with Nietzsche.

Henri Lichtenberger's book on Nietzsche wrote that Nietzsche's "uncompromising individualism, the cult of the self, hostility to the state, protest against the dogma of equality and against the cult of humanity" are just as prominent in Stirner and not as original as Nietzsche claimed.

However, Ida Overbeck, who knew Nietzsche very well, suggests that the relationship between Nietzsche's work and Stirner's should not be viewed as simple plagiarism. Her view was rather that Nietzsche owed a debt to Stirner for introducing new ideas that were significant to Nietzsche in his own work.

== Circumstantial evidence ==
Claims of influence might have been ignored were it not for the apparent similarities in the writing of the two men which were frequently noted. In addition to similarities and reports by Nietzsche's close friend that he felt an affinity for Stirner, there exist three other circumstantial details which perhaps deserve mention.

The first is that Richard Wagner, who is well known as an early influence on Nietzsche, might have been familiar with Stirner's ideas. August Röckel was known to have introduced Wagner to Russian anarchist Mikhail Bakunin and all three men were involved in the Dresden insurrection in May 1849. Wagner met with Bakunin several times during this period and is also known to have read the work of the mutualist theorist Pierre-Joseph Proudhon. Stirner was often closely associated with anarchist thought. Several authors have suggested that Wagner knew of Stirner's work and some have suggested that Stirner influenced him.

The second involves Hans von Bülow, Cosima Wagner's first husband, who was a great champion and interpreter of Wagner's music. Nietzsche apparently first met him in the early 1870s when Nietzsche was frequently a guest of the Wagners and was introduced to members of their circle. Bülow visited Basel on 27 March 1872, where he and Nietzsche held long conversations. In June of that year, Nietzsche dedicated to von Bülow his new musical composition Manfred-Meditation and sent him a copy of the score. Von Bülow replied on July 24 with strong criticism of the piece, but Nietzsche appears to have accepted this criticism with grace. In any case, he did not break off all contact with von Bülow as we know that Nietzsche sent him a complimentary copy of the first part of Zarathustra in late summer or early fall of 1883. Nietzsche also sent von Bülow a copy of Beyond Good and Evil when the printing was finished in the late summer of 1886. He also wrote to Bülow as late as 4 January 1889 during his mental illness. Bülow is known to have been a great admirer of Stirner and is reported to have known him personally. In April 1892. Bülow closed his final performance with the Berlin Philharmonic with a speech "exalting" the ideas of Stirner. Together with John Henry Mackay, Stirner's biographer, he placed a memorial plaque at Stirner's last residence in Berlin.

The third is the fact that from 1 to 17 October 1865 Nietzsche visited the house of his friend Hermann Mushacke in Berlin. Hermann's father was one Eduard Mushacke, who in the 1840s had been a "good friend" of Stirner. Nietzsche apparently befriended Eduard Mushacke. One study links this biographical detail with an "initial crisis" Nietzsche experienced in 1865 as a result of exposure to Stirner's ideas, leading to his study of Schopenhauer.

== Association of the two thinkers by anarchists ==
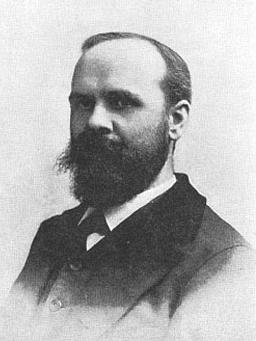
Benjamin Tucker, who suggested that anarchists should utilize Nietzsche's writings

During the 19th century, Nietzsche was frequently associated with anarchist movements in spite of the fact that in his writings he expressed a negative view of anarchists. This may be the result of a popular association during this period between his ideas and those of Stirner, whose work proved influential among individualist anarchists. The two men were frequently compared by French "literary anarchists" and anarchist interpretations of Nietzschean ideas appear to have been influential in the United States as well. Superficial similarities in the expressed ideas of the two men again seem to have played a key role in this association, both writers appropriated by radicals. This association sometimes exasperated anarchist thinkers, who often viewed Nietzsche's work as derivative.

Jean Grave, a French anarchist active in the 1890s, confronted by the growing numbers of anarchists who associated themselves with Nietzsche and Stirner expressed contempt for this trend.

This association was also common among anarchists (or individualist anarchists) in the United States in the late 19th and early 20th century. In the introduction to Benjamin Tucker's edition of the first English translation of Stirner's The Ego and Its Own, J. L. Walker wrote of Nietzsche appearing to follow Stirner, with Stirner's work contrasting with the "padded" language of Nietzsche's Zarathustra. However, Tucker himself had sought to promote Nietzsche's ideas in support of anarchism even though he acknowledged that Nietzsche himself was not an anarchist. Nietzsche's first translations in the United States likely first appeared in Tucker's Liberty.

== Arguments against influence ==
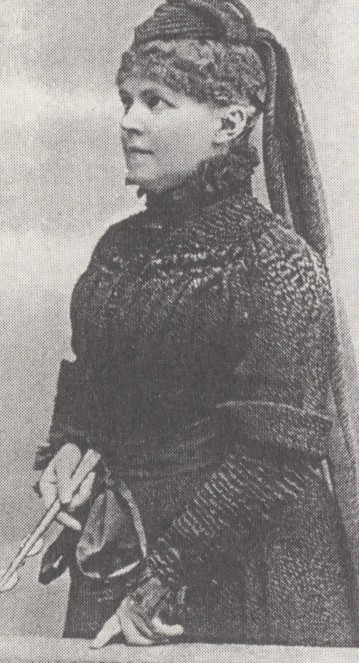
Nietzsche's sister Elisabeth worked diligently during his mental illness and after his death to establish that he had not been influenced by Stirner in any way.

When writers argue against Stirner's influence on Nietzsche, the fact that no definite mention of Stirner exists in Nietzsche's published and unpublished writing is a critical argument.

=== Albert Levy ===
The absence of any references to Stirner was noted by Albert Levy as early as 1904 in his study Stirner and Nietzsche. This argument against influence has proven quite durable as many of the brief remarks on the debate about Stirner's possible influence on Nietzsche to be found in academic publications mention this fact and little else. However, one researcher (who incidentally feels that Nietzsche was most likely not influenced by Stirner) said it was impossible to prove that someone has not read something and that it's more a matter of probability.

Levy also dealt very briefly with the fact that Nietzsche must have been aware of Stirner through the works of Hartmann and Lange (discussed above). In the case of Hartmann, he speculated that the context and nature of the mention of Stirner in Hartmann's The Philosophy of the Unconscious would not have led Nietzsche to consider Stirner's work sympathetically and goes on to add that in any case Hartmann's claims do not prove direct influence. As for the mention of Stirner in Lange, Levy suggests that because Stirner's ideas are compared in this work with Schopenhauer's, it follows that Nietzsche must have seen Stirner's work as somehow related to the philosophy of Schopenhauer. Hence, Levy proposes that if Stirner had any influence upon Nietzsche it would have come to little more than additional impetus to remain a disciple of Schopenhauer. Along these lines, he concludes that the report of the Overbecks alleging Nietzsche's affinity for Stirner arose from a misunderstanding on Nietzsche's part about the relationship between Stirner and Schopenhauer resulting from Lange's faulty interpretation.

Levy then proceeds to compare the seemingly similar ideas of the two thinkers, suggesting the similarities are superficial. According to Levy's interpretation, for example, Stirner wants to free the self from all bonds and laws while Nietzsche preaches the duty of originality and sincerity; Stirner is a realist while Nietzsche is a "humanist" who sees only barbarism beyond the frontiers of ancient Greece; Stirner has a critical mind while Nietzsche is an artist; Stirner seeks continuous improvement (for him the advent of Christianity and the French Revolution are significant milestones) while Nietzsche admires ancient Greece, sees Christianity as decadent and wants a "Renaissance"; Stirner is a "democrat" while Nietzsche is an aristocrat whose ideal state is "Platonic"; Stirner wants to liberate the self from any hierarchy while Nietzsche reserves a privileged aristocracy of originality, freedom and selfishness; and while Stirner wants to empower the spirit of opposition, Nietzsche wants to impose harsh discipline to create a beautiful race.

=== Oskar Ewald ===
Oskar Ewald suggested that Nietzsche's philosophy was not egocentric or bound to any one reality, unlike Stirner's individualism.

=== Georg Simmel ===
Georg Simmel also felt that any apparent similarities were superficial.

=== Rudolf Steiner ===
Not all who argued against influence claimed that the similarities to be found in the works of the two men were superficial. Rudolf Steiner met Elisabeth Förster-Nietzsche when he was working on the famous Weimar Edition of Johann Wolfgang von Goethe's works then in preparation under commission from the Archduchess Sophie of Saxony. She subsequently asked him to arrange the Nietzsche library and even admitted him to her ailing brother's presence. He spent several weeks in the Nietzsche Archives in Naumberg fulfilling Förster-Nietzsche's request. He also edited and wrote introductions to the works of Jean Paul Richter and Arthur Schopenhauer. Further, he was acquainted with Eduard von Hartmann and dedicated a book to him. Steiner's Friedrich Nietzsche, Fighter for Freedom was first published in 1895. In it, Steiner detects in Nietzsche's writing the quiet legacy of Stirner, adding that Stirner was clearer, and that Stirner's "Unique One" was comparable to Nietzsche's "superman".

Steiner's view appears to be that the similarities between the two writers are significant and substantial, but he accounts for this with the suggestion that Nietzsche arrived at a "Stirner-like world conception" on his own. Steiner makes no mention of any of the arguments then current suggesting the possibility or likelihood that Nietzsche was familiar with Stirner's work. Variations of this attempt to account for the seeming similarity in the writings of Stirner and Nietzsche through a theory of independent parallel development can be found in discussions of Stirner as a "precursor" of Nietzsche.

=== John Glassford ===
John Glassford believes that there is "staggering similarity" between some of the two men's ideas. While he seems to believe that it is likely that Nietzsche read Stirner, he stops short of asserting any certain influence or plagiarism, comparing Stirner's image of the state as "lion-paws and eagle-claws ... King of beasts" against Nietzsche's "the coldest of all cold monsters". He finds Stirner's prose more repetitive, with stilted metaphors compared to what he considered Nietzsche's more successful technique.

After reviewing the controversy as possible plagiarism, he concludes that there is no conclusive proof but the circumstantial evidence is strong. Following Löwith, he concludes by offering the idea that Nietzsche most likely arrived at ideas similar to Stirner's because of the "inevitable logic of post-Hegelian philosophy".

=== Thomas H. Brobjer ===
Unlike Glassford, Thomas H. Brobjer does not see any "staggering similarity" between the two men. He does accept some of the general similarities mentioned by Glassford in his article, but he feels that claims of plagiarism and even of influence are inappropriate. He proposes a new possible solution, namely that Nietzsche knew of Stirner through secondary works. Though Brobjer claims "the only known secondary source that Nietzsche read [mentioning Stirner] has been F. A. Lange's Geschichte des Materialismus" thought Nietzsche definitely read works of Hartmann where Stirner is mentioned at length.

== Arguments for influence ==
=== Anselm Ruest ===
Anselm Ruest reviewed the Nietzsche controversy in his 1906 biography of Stirner and came to the conclusion that "Nietzsche had read Stirner, but withheld mention of him in his writings because he feared that while it was 'a positive philosophy which yearned for life', it was apt to be 'misused by many readers as a justification for petty crimes and cowardly misdeeds'".

=== Paul Carus ===
Paul Carus wrote in 1914 that it does not follow that individualists against all moral authority would admit inspirational credit if neither felt any mutual obligation or debt, that "Nietzsche uses Stirner and Stirner declares that it is the good right of every ego to use his fellows, and Nietzsche shows us what the result would be".
