= The Bounds of Sense =

1966 book by Peter Strawson

The Bounds of Sense: An Essay on Kant’s Critique of Pure Reason
- Cover of the first edition
- Author: Peter Strawson
- Language: English
- Subjects: Critique of Pure Reason; Transcendental idealism
- Publisher: Methuen & Co Ltd
- Publication date: 1966
- Publication place: United Kingdom
- Media type: Print (Hardcover and Paperback)
- Pages: 296
- ISBN: 0-416-83560-0 (paperback); 0-416-29100-7 (paperback)

The Bounds of Sense: An Essay on Kant’s Critique of Pure Reason is a 1966 book about Immanuel Kant's Critique of Pure Reason (1781) by the Oxford philosopher Peter Strawson, in which the author tries to separate what remains valuable in Kant's work from Kant's transcendental idealism, which he rejects. The work is widely admired, and has received praise from philosophers as one of the first thorough works on the Critique of Pure Reason in the analytic tradition, although Strawson's treatment of transcendental idealism has been criticized.

== Summary ==
Strawson provides a critical reading of Kant's text (referring to parts of it as proceeding "by a non sequitur of numbing grossness"), with an emphasis on the analytical argument of the Transcendental Deduction, which he considers one of the few lasting contributions Kant made to philosophy. His title is a play on a title Kant himself proposed for the Critique of Pure Reason, with "sense" referring both to the mind and the sense faculties, and hence the bounds can be those of either reason or sensation.

== Background and publication history ==
According to Strawson, the book originated in lectures on the Critique of Pure Reason he began giving in 1959 at the University of Oxford. The Bounds of Sense was first published in 1966 by Methuen & Co. Ltd. It was reprinted in 1968, 1973, and 1975. In 2019, the book was republished by Routledge, with a new foreword by the philosopher Lucy Allais.

== Reception ==
The Bounds of Sense has been praised by philosophers such as John McDowell, Charles Parsons, Roger Scruton, and Howard Caygill. Allais, writing in 2019, stated that the book "remains a classic work"; she also praised its style of writing. She credited Strawson with encouraging analytic philosophy to engage with past philosophers and with creating "enormous interest in the anti-sceptical possibility of transcendental arguments" as well as in "the nature of experience of objectivity and the unity of consciousness". While she noted that Strawson's interpretation of the Deduction is controversial, she believed that he correctly identified the questions Kant was trying to answer. However, she commented that the work is "completely unlike any book on Kant that could be published today", for example in its lack of a bibliography.

More critical views include those of philosophers such as Thomas Baldwin, Frederick C. Beiser, and E. J. Lowe. Beiser writes that while Strawson is the most notable commentator to have argued that the central arguments of Kant's Analytic can be separated from Kant's transcendental psychology and transcendental idealism, his interpretation of the Deduction leaves unresolved questions. He notes that Kant himself rejected a reading of the kind proposed by Strawson. Lowe writes that while The Bounds of Sense is widely admired, Strawson is "seen by some as being unduly dismissive of Kant's doctrine of transcendental idealism" and over-optimistic in his "suggestion that many of the central arguments of Kant's critical philosophy can survive" its repudiation. Baldwin writes that Strawson's critics have argued that Strawson's attempt to separate Kant's conclusions "concerning the presuppositions of objective experience and judgment" from his transcendental idealism leads to an unstable position. In their view, transcendental arguments "can tell us only what we must suppose to be the case", meaning that "if Kant's idealism, which restricts such suppositions to things as they appear to us, is abandoned, we can draw conclusions concerning the way the world itself must be only if we add the verificationist thesis that ability to make sense of such suppositions requires ability to verify them."

In 2016, The Bounds of Sense was discussed in the European Journal of Philosophy by Allais, Henry E. Allison, Quassim Cassam, and Anil Gomes. Allais expressed disagreement with Strawson's interpretation of transcendental idealism. Allison also criticized the work, while Cassam wrote: "The realism that is implicit in The Bounds of Sense is much more explicit in Strawson's later work but relies on problematic assumptions about the relationship between epistemology and metaphysics." Gomes criticized Strawson's argument that unity of consciousness requires experience of an objective world. However, he credited Strawson with raising the important question of whether there are "ways in which we must think of our experiences if we are to self-ascribe them".

== See also ==
- Neo-Kantianism
