= Neo-Kantianism =

Revival of Immanuel Kant's philosophy

In late modern philosophy, neo-Kantianism (German: Neukantianismus) was a revival of the 18th-century philosophy of Immanuel Kant. The neo-Kantians sought to develop and clarify Kant's theories, particularly his concept of the thing-in-itself and his moral philosophy.

== Origins ==
The "back to Kant" movement began in the 1860s, as a reaction to the German materialist controversy in the 1850s.

In addition to the work of Hermann von Helmholtz and Eduard Zeller, early fruits of the movement were Kuno Fischer's works on Kant and Friedrich Albert Lange's 1873–75 work Geschichte des Materialismus (History of Materialism), the latter of which argued that transcendental idealism superseded the historic struggle between material idealism and mechanistic materialism. Fischer was earlier involved in a dispute with the Aristotelian idealist Friedrich Adolf Trendelenburg concerning the interpretation of the results of the Transcendental Aesthetic, a dispute that prompted Hermann Cohen's 1871 seminal work Kants Theorie der Erfahrung (Kant's Theory of Experience), a book often regarded as the foundation of 20th-century neo-Kantianism. It is in reference to the Fischer–Trendelenburg debate and Cohen's work that Hans Vaihinger started his massive commentary on the Critique of Pure Reason.

== Varieties ==
The several schools of thought, in spite of seeing themselves as united by a common movement, often saw massive fundamental disagreements.

Hermann Cohen became the leader of the Marburg School (centered in the town of the same name), the other prominent representatives of which were Paul Natorp and Ernst Cassirer. Another important group, the Southwest (German) School (also known as the Heidelberg School (Note: Not to be confused with the Heidelberg School of philosophy of subjectivity.) or Baden School, centered in Heidelberg, Baden in Southwest Germany) included Wilhelm Windelband, Heinrich Rickert, Ernst Troeltsch, and Emil Lask. The Marburg School emphasized epistemology and philosophical logic, whereas the Southwest school emphasized issues of culture and value theory (notably the fact–value distinction).

A third group, mainly represented by Leonard Nelson, established the Göttingen-based neo-Friesian School (named after post-Kantian philosopher Jakob Friedrich Fries) which emphasized philosophy of science.

The neo-Kantian schools tended to emphasize scientific readings of Kant, often downplaying the role of intuition in favour of concepts. However, the ethical aspects of neo-Kantian thought often drew them within the orbit of socialism, and they had an important influence on Austromarxism and the revisionism of Eduard Bernstein. Lange and Cohen in particular were keen on this connection between Kantian thought and socialism. Another important aspect of the neo-Kantian movement was its attempt to promote a revised notion of Judaism, particularly in Cohen's seminal work, one of the few works of the movement available in English translation.

The neo-Kantian school was of importance in devising a division of philosophy that has had durable influence well beyond Germany. It made early use of terms such as epistemology and upheld its prominence over ontology. Natorp had a decisive influence on the history of phenomenology and is often credited with leading Edmund Husserl to adopt the vocabulary of transcendental idealism. Emil Lask was influenced by Edmund Husserl's work, and himself exerted a remarkable influence on the young Martin Heidegger. The debate between Cassirer and Heidegger over the interpretation of Kant (see Cassirer–Heidegger debate) led the latter to formulate reasons for viewing Kant as a forerunner of phenomenology; this view was disputed in important respects by Eugen Fink. An abiding achievement of the neo-Kantians was the founding of the journal Kant-Studien, which still survives today.

By 1933 (after the rise of Nazism), the various neo-Kantian circles in Germany had dispersed.

== Further influence ==
The neo-Kantian movement had a significant impact on the development of 20th-century philosophy, particularly in the areas of epistemology, metaphysics, and ethics. It continues to be an important influence on contemporary philosophy, particularly in the fields of social and political philosophy.

Towards the end of 1898, G. E. Moore and Bertrand Russell rebelled against Kant and Hegel, who were the leading philosophers within British and American universities at that time. Neo-Kantianism was banned out of them for the following fifty years and continued to survive solely in the Continental Philosophy. In the 1960s Strawson published The Bounds of Sense, which relaunched Neo-Kantianism while proposing to deny its doctrine of transcendental idealism. John Rawls' A Theory of Justice (1971) restored Kantian practical philosophy of the categorical imperative.

== Notable neo-Kantian philosophers ==
- Eduard Zeller (1814–1908)
- Charles Bernard Renouvier (1815–1903)
- Hermann Lotze (1817–1881)
- Hermann von Helmholtz (1821–1894)
- Kuno Fischer (1824–1907)
- Friedrich Albert Lange (1828–1875)
- Wilhelm Dilthey (1833–1911)
- African Spir (1837–1890)
- Otto Liebmann (1840–1912)
- Hermann Cohen (1842–1918)
- Alois Riehl (1844–1924)
- Wilhelm Windelband (1848–1915)
- Victor Brochard (1848–1907)
- Johannes Volkelt (1848–1930)
- Benno Erdmann (1851–1921)
- Hans Vaihinger (1852–1933)
- Paul Natorp (1854–1924)
- Émile Meyerson (1859–1933)
- Karl Vorländer (1860–1928)
- Heinrich Rickert (1863–1936)
- Ernst Troeltsch (1865–1923)
- Jonas Cohn (1869–1947)
- Robert Reininger (1869–1955)
- Ernst Cassirer (1874–1945)
- Emil Lask (1875–1915)
- Richard Honigswald (1875–1947)
- Bruno Bauch (1877–1942)
- Leonard Nelson (1882–1927)
- Hans Kelsen (1881–1973)
- Joseph B. Soloveitchik (1903-1993)

Related thinkers

- Ernst Mach (1838–1916)
- Robert Adamson (1852–1902)
- Henri Poincaré (1854–1912)
- Georg Simmel (1858–1918)
- Max Weber (1864–1920)
- Nicolai Hartmann (1882–1950)
- José Ortega y Gasset (1883–1955)
- György Lukács (1885–1971)
- Hermann Weyl (1885–1955)

== Contemporary neo-Kantianism ==
In the analytic tradition, the revival of interest in the work of Kant that has been underway since Peter Strawson's work The Bounds of Sense (1966) can also be viewed as effectively neo-Kantian, not least due to its continuing emphasis on epistemology at the expense of ontology. Around the same time as Strawson, Wilfrid Sellars also renewed interest in Kant's philosophy. His project of introducing a Kantian turn in contemporary analytic philosophy has been taken up by his student Robert Brandom. Brandom's work has transformed Sellars' project to introducing a Hegelian phase in analytic philosophy. In the 1980s, interest in neo-Kantianism has revived in the wake of the work of Gillian Rose, who is a critic of this movement's influence on modern philosophy, and because of its influence on the work of Max Weber. The Kantian concern for the limits of perception strongly influenced the antipositivist sociological movement in late 19th-century Germany, particularly in the work of Georg Simmel (Simmel's question 'What is society?' is a direct allusion to Kant's own: 'What is nature'?). The work of Michael Friedman was explicitly neo-Kantian.

Continental philosophers drawing on the Kantian understandings of the transcendental include Jean-François Lyotard and Jean-Luc Nancy.

Classical conservative thinker Roger Scruton has been greatly influenced by Kantian ethics and aesthetics.

== See also ==
- Critical philosophy
- German idealism
- Neocriticism
- North American Kant Society
- German philosophy: 19th century
