= Moritz Wilhelm Drobisch =

German mathematician, logician, psychologist and philosopher

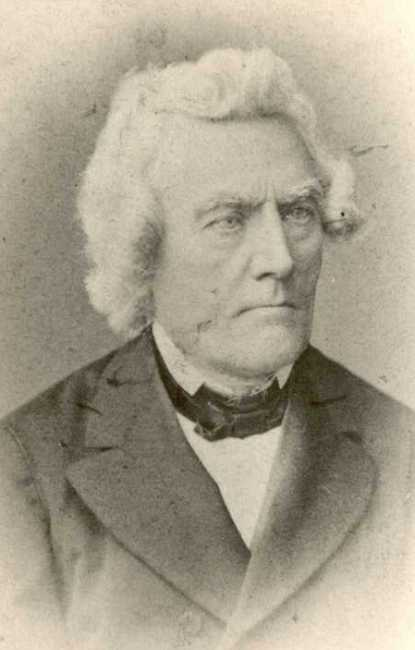
M. W. Drobisch

Moritz Wilhelm Drobisch (16 August 1802 – 30 September 1896) was a German mathematician, logician, psychologist and philosopher, born in Leipzig. His brother was the composer Karl Ludwig Drobisch (1803–1854).

== Life ==
Drobisch studied mathematics and philosophy at the University of Leipzig, where he subsequently became a professor. He wrote his habilitation in 1824. From 1826 to 1868 he served as ordinarius (full professor) in mathematics, and from 1842 on as ordinarius in philosophy. He was rector of the university of Leipzig in 1840–41 and served as dean of the philosophical faculty several times. Drobisch made contributions to philosophical and mathematical logic, set theory, quantitative linguistics and empirical psychology. Drobisch was strongly influenced by Johann Friedrich Herbart.

In 1834, Drobisch joined the Count Jablonowski Society of the Sciences in Leipzig. In 1846 he was a co-founder of the Saxony's Royal Society of the Sciences, whose successor organisation has named a medal in his honour. In 1868, Drobisch resigned from the mathematics department to devote himself to philosophy. He was made an honorary citizen of Leipzig in 1876. In his later years, Drobisch's blindness progressed, making scholarly work impossible from the mid-1880s on. Wilhelm Wundt, a pioneer of German empirical psychology, held Drobisch's funeral oration and acknowledged his influence. Drobisch was one of the forerunners of the neo-Kantian revival of the 1860s. Friedrich Albert Lange criticized him and Herbart in his Foundations of Mathematical Psychology (1865).

Drobisch died in Leipzig.

== Works ==
- 1834: Beiträge zur Orientierung über Herbart's System der Philosophie. [Contributions to the Orientation in Herbart's System of Philosophy.] Significantly revised and expanded editions in 1851 and 1863.
- 1836: Neue Darstellung der Logik nach ihren einfachsten Verhältnissen. Nebst einem logisch-mathematischen Anhange. [New presentation of Logic in its Most Basic Relations. With a Logico–Mathematical Appendix.]
- 1840: Quaestionum mathematico-psychologicarum. [Mathematical–Psychological Question.]
- 1842: Empirische Psychologie nach wissenschaftlicher Methode. [Empirical Psychology According to the Scientific Method.]
- 1846: Über die mathematische Bestimmung der musikalischen Intervalle. [On the Mathematical Determination of Musical Intervals.]
- 1850: Erste Grundlegung der mathematischen Psychologie. [First Foundation of Mathematical Psychology.]
- 1867: Die moralische Statistik und die menschliche Willensfreiheit. [Moral Statistics and Human Free Will.]
- 1876: Über die Fortbildung der Philosophie durch Herbart. [On Herbart's Continuation of Philosophy.]
- 1885: Kant's Dinge an sich und sein Erfahrungsbegriff. [Kant's Things in Themselves and his Concept of Experience.]

== Sources ==
- Heinze, M., 'Drobisch, Moritz.' In: Allgemeine Deutsche Biographie, Vol. 48. Leipzig 1904, pp. 80–82.
- Best, K.H., 'Moritz Wilhelm Drobisch (1802–1896).' In: Glottometrics 17, 2008, pp. 109–114. (PDF ram-verlag.eu)
- Neubert-Drobisch, W., Moritz Wilhelm Drobisch: ein Gelehrtenleben. Leipzig 1902.
- Moritz Wilhelm Drobisch anlässlich seines 200. Geburtstages. Verlag der Sächsischen Akademie der Wissenschaften. Stuttgart and Leipzig, 2003.
