= Karl Vorländer =

Karl Vorländer (2 January 1860, Marburg – 6 December 1928, Münster) was a German neo-Kantian philosopher who taught in Solingen. He published various studies and editions of the works of Immanuel Kant, including studies of the relation between Kantian thought and socialist thought, and of the influence of Kant on the work of Johann Wolfgang von Goethe. His 1924 biography of Kant became a classic of Kant scholarship for much of the twentieth century.

The school of neo-Kantianism Vorländer is most closely associated with is the Marburg school. At Marburg University, he was a student of Paul Natorp. He completed his dissertation on formalism in Kant's ethics there in 1893.

== Works ==
- Der Formalismus der Kantischen Ethik in seiner Notwendigkeit und Fruchtbarkeit (1893 dissertation)
- Kant, Schiller, Goethe (Leipzig: Dürr, 1907 and 1923)
- Geschichte der Philosophie (1903, 1911 and 1919)
- Immanuel Kants Leben (1911)
- Kant und Marx: ein Beitrag zur Philosophie des Sozialismus (Tübingen: Mohr, 1911 and 1926)
- Kant, Fichte, Hegel und der Sozialismus (Berlin: Cassirer, 1920)
- Immanuel Kant. Der Mann und das Werk (2 vols.; Leipzig: Felix Meiner, 1924)
