= Heinrich Rickert (politician) =

German journalist and politician (1833–1902)

Heinrich Edwin Rickert
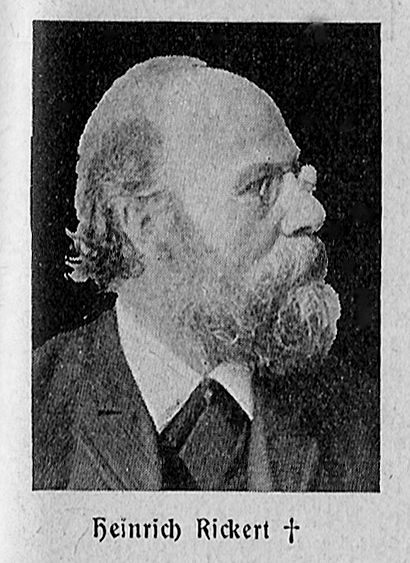

Member of the Reichstag
- In office 1874–1902
- Constituency: Danzig (1874–1884, 1890–1902), Potsdam (1884–1890)

Landesdirektor Provinziallandtag Province of Prussia
- In office 1876–1878

Prussian House of Representatives
- In office 1870–1902

Member of the town Council of Danzig
- In office 1863–1876

Personal details
- Born: Heinrich Edwin Rickert; 27 December 1833 Putzig, Province of Prussia (Puck, Poland)
- Died: 3 November 1902 (aged 68) Berlin, Germany
- Party: National Liberal Party; Liberal Union (Germany); German Free-minded Party; Free-minded Union
- Spouse: Annette Stoddart (1839–1889)
- Children: 2, including Heinrich
- Education: University of Breslau; Humboldt University
- Occupation: Journalist

Heinrich Edwin Rickert (German: [ˈʁɪkɐt]; 27 December 1833 – 3 November 1902) was a German journalist and liberal politician. He was the father of the philosopher Heinrich Rickert.

== Biography ==
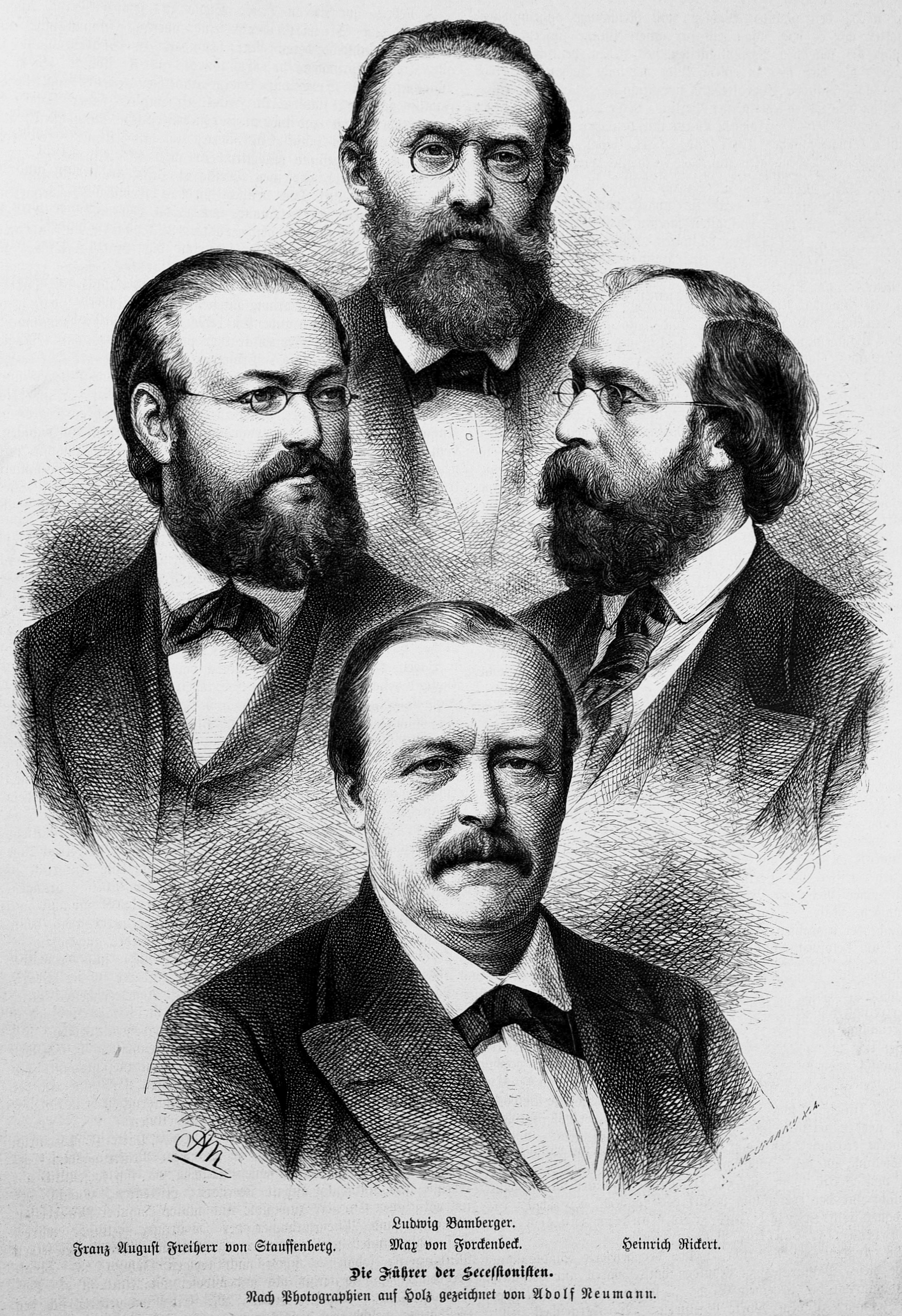
Rickert (center right) and Ludwig Bamberger, Franz August Schenk von Stauffenberg, Max von Forckenbeck in 1880

Rickert was born in Putzig, West Prussia (Puck, Poland), his father was the head of the local post office and later a customs officer. Rickert attended school in Danzig (Gdańsk) and Thorn (Toruń) and studied economics at the Universities of Breslau (Wrocław) and Berlin.

In 1858, he started to work as a journalist for the newfounded Danziger Zeitung and soon became its editor and owner. In 1863, Rickert became a member of the City council of Danzig, he was a Co-founder of the National Liberal Party in 1866 and, next to Max von Forckenbeck, Ludwig Bamberger and Eduard Lasker, member of the party executive in 1867 and from 1877 to 1880.

=== Parliamentarian ===
Rickert was elected a member of the Prussian House of Representatives in 1870 and a member of the German Parliament in 1874. From 1875 to 1878 Rickert was also member and president of the diet of the Province of Prussia until the separation of the province into East and West Prussia in 1878.

In a political conflict about the defense budget, fiscal bills and the Kulturkampf policy Rickert left his party and founded the left-liberal Liberal Union ("Secessionists") in 1880, Rickert led the party and published their "Reichsblatt" since 1882.

In March 1884 the Liberal Union merged with the German Progress Party and formed the German Free-minded Party. Rickert joined Eugen Richter as co-chairman but left the party again in a conflict regarding the defense budget in 1893. He and several other former "Secessionists" now formed the Free-minded Union, which he led until his death in 1902.

=== Non-parliamentary activities ===
Rickert followed Franz Hermann Schulze-Delitzsch as chairman of the Society for adult education ("Gesellschaft für Verbreitung von Volksbildung") and was a leading figure in the founding of the Organization for combatting Anti-Semitism ("Vereins zur Abwehr des Antisemitismus") in 1890. Following the death of Rudolf von Gneist in 1895 Rickert became its president. In 1892, Rickert was a founding member of the German Peace Society.

Rickert strongly supported the foundation of the Technical University of Danzig, which was completed in 1904, and was the chairman of the supervisory board of the Danzig Bank Association (Danziger Bankverein).

=== Family ===
Rickert was married to Annette Stoddart (1839–1889), they had two sons, Franz (1872–1939) and the philosopher Heinrich Rickert. Rickert died on 3 November 1902 in Berlin.
