= Integrative level =

Set of phenomena emerging from pre-existing phenomena

An integrative level, or level of organization, is a set of phenomena emerging from pre-existing phenomena of a lower level. The levels concept is an intellectual framework for structuring reality. It arranges all entities, structures, and processes in the universe, or in a certain field of study, into a hierarchy, typically based on how complex their organization is. When arranged this way, each entity is three things at the same time: It is made up of parts from the previous level below. It is a whole in its own right. And it is a part of the whole that is on the next level above. Typical examples include life emerging from non-living substances, and consciousness emerging from nervous systems.

== Levels ==
The main levels usually acknowledged are those of matter, life, mind, and society. These are called strata in philosopher Nicolai Hartmann's ontology. Levels can be further analyzed into more specific layers, such as those of particles, atoms, molecules, and rocks forming the material stratum, or those of cells, organisms, populations, and ecosystems forming the life stratum.

The sequence of levels is often described as one of increasing complexity, although it is not clear whether this is always true: for example, parasitism emerges on pre-existing organisms, although parasites are often simpler than their originating forms.

== Philosophies ==
Ideas connected to integrative levels can be found in the works of both materialist philosophers and anti-materialist ones. Some philosophers and scientists have argued against certain ideas about levels of organization (see § Arguments against levels of organization).

== See also ==
- Antireductionism – Concept in philosophy and psychology
- Big History – Education strategy or academic discipline
- Biological organisation – Hierarchy of complex structures and systems within biological sciences
- Bottom-up and top-down approaches (design) – Strategies for composition and decomposition
- Boundary problem (spatial analysis) – Geographical problem of calculating properties near edges of areas
- Hierarchy theory – Means of studying complex ecological systems
- Holon (philosophy) – Something that is simultaneously a whole and a part
- Level of analysis – Location, size, or scale of a research target
- Levels of analysis (David Marr) – British neuroscientist and psychologist
- Mereology – Study of parts and the wholes they form
- Mereotopology – Branch of metaphysics
- Model of hierarchical complexity – Framework for scoring a behavior's complexity
- Modifiable areal unit problem – Source of statistical bias
- Nicolai Hartmann – German philosopher (1882–1950)
- Scale of analysis
- Spatial scale
- Structuralism (biology) – Attempt to explain evolution by forces other than natural selection
- The central science – Term often associated with chemistry
- Tree of knowledge system – Map of history from Big Bang to present
- Unity of science – Theory in the philosophy of science
- Vitalism – Belief about living organisms
