= Friedrich Albert Lange =

German philosopher and sociologist (1828–1875)

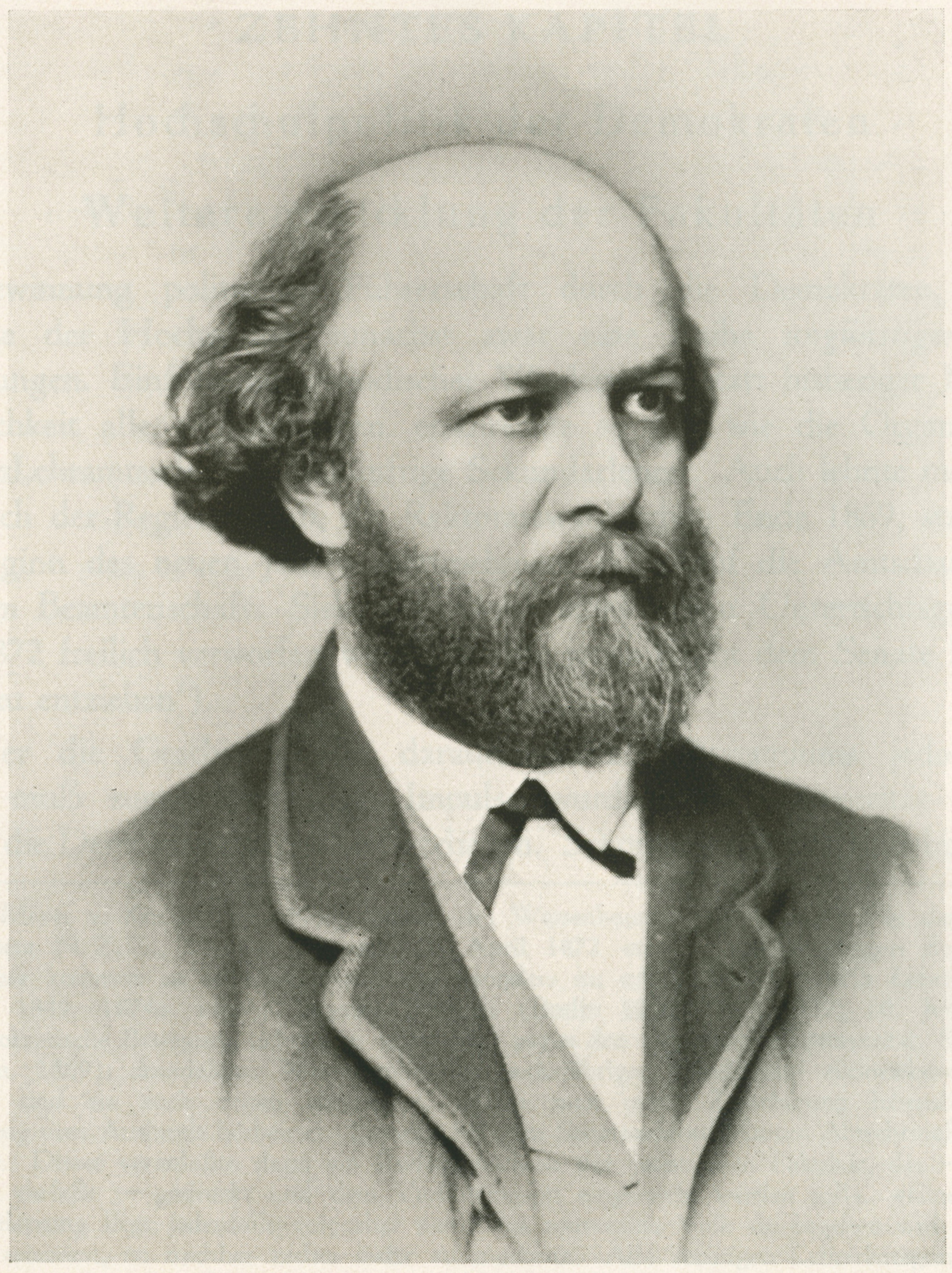
- Born: 28 September 1828; Wald near Solingen, Rhine Province, Prussia
- Died: 21 November 1875 (aged 47); Marburg, Province of Hesse-Nassau, Prussia

Education
- Education: University of Bonn
- Academic advisor: Friedrich Wilhelm Ritschl

Philosophical work
- Era: 19th-century philosophy
- Region: Western philosophy
- School: Neo-Kantianism
- Institutions: University of Zurich; University of Marburg
- Doctoral students: Hermann Cohen
- Notable ideas: Criticism of Marxist materialism

Friedrich Albert Lange (/ˈlɑːŋɡə/; German: [ˈlaŋə]; 28 September 1828 – 21 November 1875) was a German philosopher and sociologist.

== Biography ==
F. A. Lange

Lange was born in Wald, near Solingen, the son of the theologian, Johann Peter Lange. He was educated at Duisburg, Zurich and the University of Bonn, where he distinguished himself in gymnastics as much as academically. In 1852, he became a schoolmaster at Cologne; in 1853 Privatdozent in philosophy at Bonn; and in 1858, schoolmaster at Duisburg, resigning when the government forbade schoolmasters to take part in political activities.

Lange entered journalism as editor of the Rhein- und Ruhr-Zeitung in 1862 in the cause of political and social reform. His ceterum censeo can be considered to be the repeated demand for Bismarck's resignation. He was prominent in public affairs, yet found enough time to write most of his best-known books, Die Leibesübungen (1863), Die Arbeiterfrage (1865, 5th ed. 1894), Geschichte des Materialismus (1866), and John Stuart Mills Ansichten über die soziale Frage (1866). He also wrote a number of works on pedagogy and psychology. In 1863, Lange supported the socialist leader Ferdinand Lassalle in an important trial concerning the constitutional guarantee of academic freedom. From 1864 to 1866, Lange was a member of the executive committee of the Association of German Labour Unions (Verband Deutscher Arbeitervereine), an early organisation of the German labour movement. One of his colleagues there was August Bebel, the Social-Democratic leader who wrote of him that "he had a short and strong figure, and was of a sympathetic presence. He had magnificent eyes, and was one of the most amiable men whom I have ever known. He won the hearts of people at first sight" while also describing him as of "firm character".

In 1866, discouraged by affairs in Germany, he moved to Winterthur, near Zurich, to become connected with the democratic newspaper, Winterthurer Landbote. In 1869, he was Privatdozent at the University of Zurich, and the next year he was appointed professor of inductive philosophy, a new position. He was also engaged in the Swiss Democratic movement and helped write the constitution of the Canton of Zurich. This was distinguished by the use of "direct democratic" measures such as referendum and recall. Still in Zurich, he recognized first signs of his illness, which led several years later to his death. The strong French sympathies of the Swiss in the Franco-Prussian War, as well as the prospect of a pension for his wife in the case of his death, led to his speedy resignation. He had an offer from the universities of Würzburg, Königsberg, Kiel, Gießen and Jena, but in 1872 he accepted a professorship at the University of Marburg. He is sometimes credited with founding the Marburg School of neo-Kantianism, along with his star pupil, Hermann Cohen. It was Cohen, however, who pioneered the Marburg School's characteristic logicist interpretation of Kantian philosophy. In later years, Lange accepted Cohen's refutation of a psychological interpretation of the a priori, to which he himself had once subscribed.

Although he rejected Marxist materialism, a materialism that, according to Engels and Marx, he had completely misunderstood, Lange continued to influence the German Social-Democratic movement. He favoured an ethically motivated, reformist socialism. He especially influenced some leaders of the Lassallean General German Workers' Union and, posthumously, the Revisionist theoretician Eduard Bernstein, whose slogan "Kant, not cant" proclaimed his abandonment of Marxian "scientific socialism" in favour of a neo-Kantian, ethically based social reformism. Subsequent leaders of the Marburg School, such as Cohen and Natorp, continued this association with the reformist wing of the SPD. Unhappily, his body was already stricken with disease. He no longer played a role in the unification of the Lassalleans with Bebel's socialists into the unified SPD in May 1875. After a lingering illness, probably gastrointestinal cancer, he died in Marburg in November of that year. His Logische Studien (Logical Studies) were published by Hermann Cohen in 1877. Lange also wrote a number of literary studies which were published posthumously. His main work, the Geschichte des Materialismus is a didactic exposition of principles rather than a history in the proper sense. According to Lange, to think clearly about materialism is to refute it.

There is a comprehensive school named after him, the Friedrich-Albert-Lange-Gesamtschule, in Wald, his birthplace, which is now part of the city of Solingen.

== Philosophy ==
Adopting the Kantian standpoint that we can know nothing but phenomena, Lange maintained that neither materialism nor any other metaphysical system has a valid claim to ultimate truth. For empirical phenomenal knowledge, however, materialism, with its exact scientific methods, has done a most valuable service. Ideal metaphysics, though they fail of the inner truth of things, have a value as the embodiment of high aspirations, in the same way as poetry and religion. In Lange's Logische Studien, which attempts a reconstruction of formal logic, the leading idea is that reasoning has validity insofar as it can be represented in terms of space. His Arbeiterfrage advocates an ill-defined form of socialism. It protests against contemporary industrial selfishness, and against the organization of industry on the Darwinian principle of struggle for existence.

== Political activism ==
Lange was a known political activist who frequently advocated for nonviolent social change in Germany, commonly attributed to his support of worker's rights and women's suffrage following the upsurge of labor movements during Germany's early industrialization. Lange was sympathetic towards the rallying of workers' unions as he believed them to be a crucial step towards the egalitarian society he details in a large variety of his published works. When Lange was twenty, he became an official member of the German Social Democratic Party, otherwise known as the SPD, and would swiftly rise to prominence primarily as a result of his dedication to improving workers’ well-being and education. He would remain an important piece of the SPD until his death at the age of forty-seven. Lange upheld his belief in passive reform and argued against the use of violence in spite of many revolutionaries who he frequently clashed with. His loyalty to his ideals enabled him to accrue a great following of supporters that believed in his idea of a peaceful revolution, giving him a powerful basis for his later movements and publications.

Prior to his time spent in the SPD, Lange was a member of the General German Workers' Association, also known as ADAV. The association was founded by Ferdinand Lassalle, and the two would frequently engage in debate regarding their differing stances on the role held by the state in supporting significant social change. He served as a primary editor for the party's newspaper, enabling him to shape the public's perception of socialism while engaging in meaningful debates regarding the organization's goals. Lange was a strong supporter of the state's power to influence the revolution and remained steadfast in his opposition to revolutionary violence. During his time as an editor in the association, he would establish trade unions through his socialist approach to politics that would ultimately form the basis of the upcoming socialist movement in Germany. In 1865, Lange would decide to leave the ADAV under the notion that the organization had become overly authoritarian and ego-centric under the leadership of Lassalle.

In 1848, Lange, being only twenty years of age, was deeply involved in the revolutionary uprisings spreading across Europe. He was seen rallying behind workers as they demanded political reform and freedom from the Prussian monarchy. During this time, Lange was an outspoken advocate for the use of revolutionary violence, as he believed it was necessary to achieve an equitable society; however, he would reconsider his stance following the failure of the revolution. Being encouraged to flee Germany in light of his role in the revolution, Lange would continue writing about German socialist reform while living in Switzerland, drawing primarily from socialist and liberal ideologies.

Following his change in perception regarding the nature of revolutionary violence, Lange shifted his approach to supporting the underrepresented working class. Lange had a fundamental belief that the primary concern for the working class lay in its inaccessibility to affordable living based on the minimal wages being provided. Lange would spend a significant amount of time analyzing the beliefs of Thomas Malthus. Thomas believed that an increase in food availability should be the first and foremost concern when attempting to raise the standing of the working class, as the primary constraint is in the struggle for mere existence. While Malthus' notions would be most commonly interpreted as supportive of capitalism and widely disparaged in Germany, Lange had a unique understanding of his argument that led him to conclude that bolstering the lower class's living conditions must be brought through a fundamental change in the legal system. He believed that it was in the responsibility of those in a higher class, especially those involved in state government, to listen to the demands of the working class, and mediate the standard of living through gradual reform via rational arguments.

== Works ==
- 1855: Über den Zusammenhang der Erziehungssysteme mit den herrschenden Weltanschauungen verschiedener Zeitalter. (On the Connection Between the Educational Systems with the Dominant World Views of Different Eras.)
- 1862: Die Stellung der Schule zum öffentlichen Leben. (The Position of the School in Relation to Public Life.)
- 1863: Die Leibesübungen. Eine Darstellung des Werdens und Wesens der Turnkunst in ihrer pädagogischen und culturhistorischen Bedeutung. (Physical Exercise: A Presentation of the History and Essence of Gymnastics in its Pedagogical and Cultural-Historical Significance.)
- 1865: Die Arbeiterfrage in ihrer Bedeutung für Gegenwart und Zukunft. (The Labour Question in its Present and Future Significance.)
- 1865: Die Grundlegung der mathematischen Psychologie. Ein Versuch zur Nachweisung des fundamentalen Fehlers bei Herbart und Drobisch. (Foundations of Mathematical Psychology. Attempt at a Demonstration of the Fundamental Error of Herbart and Drobisch.)
- 1866: Geschichte des Materialismus und Kritik seiner Bedeutung in der Gegenwart. (History of Materialism and Critique of its Present Significance.)
- 1877: Logische Studien. Ein Beitrag zur Neubegründung der formalen Logik und der Erkenntnisstheorie. (Logical Studies. A Contribution to the New Foundation of Formal Logic and Cognitive Theory.)

== Sources ==
A comprehensive bibliography of Lange's own works, as well as some of the secondary literature, can be found online at philpapers.org.

- Hoffman, Matthew J. (2010). Friedrich Albert Lange: A Political Life (2nd ed.). Northwestern University Press. pp. 43–107
- Hussain, Nadeem J. Z.; Patton, Lydia (2021), Zalta, Edward N. (ed.), "Friedrich Albert Lange", The Stanford Encyclopedia of Philosophy (Winter 2021 ed.), Metaphysics Research Lab, Stanford University, retrieved 2023-05-03
- Rines, George Edwin, ed. (1920). "Lange, Friedrich Albert" . Encyclopedia Americana.
