= Heinrich Rickert =

German philosopher (1863–1936)

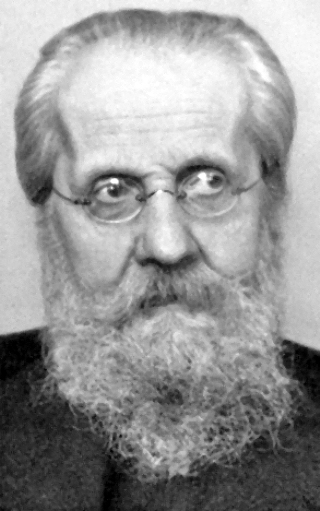
- Born: Heinrich John Rickert; 25 May 1863; Danzig, Prussia
- Died: 25 July 1936 (aged 73); Heidelberg, Nazi Germany
- Father: H. E. Rickert

Education
- Education: University of Berlin; University of Strasbourg (PhD, 1888); University of Freiburg (Dr. phil. hab., 1891)
- Thesis: Zur Lehre von der Definition (On the Theory of Definition) (1888)
- Doctoral advisor: Wilhelm Windelband (PhD advisor); Alois Riehl (Dr. phil. hab. advisor)
- Other advisor: Friedrich Paulsen

Philosophical work
- Era: 19th-century philosophy
- Region: Western philosophy
- School: Neo-Kantianism (Baden school)
- Institutions: University of Freiburg (1894–1915); University of Heidelberg (1915–1932)
- Doctoral students: Bruno Bauch; Martin Heidegger; Richard Kroner
- Notable students: Walter Benjamin; Rudolf Carnap; Emil Lask
- Main interests: Epistemology, metaphysics
- Notable ideas: Qualitative distinction between historical and scientific facts Distinction between knowing (kennen) and cognizing (erkennen)

Heinrich John Rickert (/ˈrɪkərt/; German: [ˈʁɪkɐt]; 25 May 1863 – 25 July 1936) was a German philosopher, a leading neo-Kantian of the Baden school.

== Life ==
Rickert was born in Danzig, Prussia (now Gdańsk, Poland) to the journalist and later politician Heinrich Edwin Rickert and Annette née Stoddart. He was professor of philosophy at the University of Freiburg (1894–1915, succeeded by Edmund Husserl) and the University of Heidelberg (1915–1932, succeeding Wilhelm Windelband). He died in Heidelberg amid Nazi Germany.

Despite his earlier support for Jewish philosophers, Rickert later embraced National Socialism.

== Philosophy ==
Rickert is known for his discussion of a qualitative distinction between historical and scientific facts. He also argued (against Wilhelm Dilthey, Georg Simmel, and the anti-rationalist philosophers of life) that only someone who takes a purely theoretical standpoint can reflect on the world as a whole.

Rickert's philosophy was an important influence on the work of sociologist Max Weber, who borrowed much of his methodology, including the concept of the ideal type. Philosopher Martin Heidegger began his academic career as Rickert's assistant, graduating and writing his habilitation thesis under Rickert.

Charles R. Bambach writes:

In his work Rickert, like Dilthey, intended to offer a unifying theory of knowledge which, although accepting a division between science and history or Natur and Geist, overcame this division in a new philosophical method. For Dilthey the method was wedded to hermeneutics; for Rickert it was the transcendental method of Kant.

In addition, Rickert's Die Grenzen der naturwissenschaftlichen Begriffsbildung was cited by the Kantian scholar Lewis White Beck as a major source of inspiration during his early studies as an undergraduate with Leroy Loemker.

Rickert and Windelband led the Baden school of neo-Kantians.

== Works ==
- Zur Lehre von der Definition [On the Theory of Definition] (1888) (doctoral thesis). Center for Research libraries, crl.edu 2nd. ed., 1915. 3rd ed., 1929.
- Der Gegenstand der Erkenntnis: ein Beitrag zum Problem der philosophischen Transcendenz (1892). Google (UCal)
  - 2nd ed., 1904: Der Gegenstand der Erkenntnis: Einführung in die Transzendentalphilosophie. Google (UMich)
- Die Grenzen der naturwissenschaftlichen Begriffsbildung. Vol. I. Freiburg i. B. und Leipzig: J. C. B. Mohr. 896–1902 – via Internet Archive. Google (NYPL) 2nd ed., 1913.
  - (in English) The Limits of Concept Formation in Natural Science (1986). (Tr. Guy Oakes.) ISBN 0-521-25139-7
- Fichtes Atheismusstreit und die kantische Philosophie (1899). Google (UCal) IA (UToronto)
- Kulturwissenschaft und Naturwissenschaft (1899). 6th/7th revised and expanded ed., 1926.
  - (in English) Science and history: A critique of positivist epistemology. Translated by George Reisman. Princeton, NJ: D. Van Nostrand Company. 1962 – via Internet Archive.
- "Geschichtsphilosophie" in Die Philosophie im Beginn des zwanzigsten Jahrhunderts (1905). 2 volumes. Vol. 2, pp. 51–135
- Die Probleme der Geschichtsphilosophie: eine Einführung, 3rd ed., 1924. New ed.: Celtis Verlag, Berlin 2013, ISBN 978-3-944253-01-5
- Wilhelm Windelband (1915).
- Die Philosophie des Lebens: Darstellung und Kritik der philosophischen Modeströmungen unserer Zeit (1920). IA (UToronto) 2nd ed., 1922.
- Allgemeine Grundlegung der Philosophie (1921). [System der Philosophie vol. 1]
- Kant als Philosoph der modernen Kultur (1924).
- Über die Welt der Erfahrung (1927).
- Die Logik des Prädikats und das Problem der Ontologie (1930).
- Die Heidelberger Tradition in der Deutschen Philosophie (1931).
- Goethes Faust (1932).
- Grundprobleme der Philosophie: Methodologie, Ontologie, Anthropologie (1934). ISBN 3-86550-985-1
- Unmittelbarkeit und Sinndeutung (1939).
