= Emil Lask =

Austrian Galician–born German philosopher

- Born: 25 September 1875; Wadowitz, (Note: Now Wadowice, Lesser Poland, Poland) Austrian Galicia, Austria-Hungary
- Died: 26 May 1915 (aged 39); Turza Mała, (Note: Now Mala Turya, Ivano-Frankivsk Oblast, Ukraine) Austrian Galicia, Austria-Hungary

Education
- Education: University of Freiburg (PhD, 1901); University of Heidelberg (Dr. phil. hab., 1905)
- Doctoral advisor: Heinrich Rickert (PhD advisor); Wilhelm Windelband (Dr. phil. hab. advisor)

Philosophical work
- Era: 20th-century philosophy
- Region: Western philosophy
- School: Neo-Kantianism (Baden school)
- Institutions: University of Heidelberg
- Notable students: Eugen Herrigel
- Main interests: Epistemology, philosophical logic, philosophy of law
- Notable ideas: The logic of philosophy

Emil Lask (/lɑːsk/; German: [lask]; 25 September 1875 – 26 May 1915) was an Austrian Galician–born German philosopher specializing in epistemology and the philosophy of law. A student of Heinrich Rickert at Freiburg University and Wilhelm Windelband at Heidelberg University, he was a member of the Baden school of neo-Kantianism.

== Biography ==
Lask was born in Austrian Galicia, as a son of Jewish parents. After completing his philosophical education, he was made a lecturer at the University of Heidelberg in 1905, and he was elected professor there just before the outbreak of World War I.

When war began in 1914, Lask immediately volunteered. Since, as a Heidelberg professor, he would have been regarded as indispensable on the home front, he did not have to enlist. But, conscientious and idealistic, Lask believed that he had an obligation to serve his country. Lask was made a sergeant and sent to Galicia on the Eastern Front, despite a frail constitution and severe myopia—which also meant that he could not shoot, but he still felt obliged to remain at the front. Lask died during the war, not far from the city of his birth, in the Galician Campaign. Wilhelm Windelband had refused to request his return to Heidelberg as indispensable to philosophy.

Lask was an important and original thinker whose rewarding work is little known, due to his early death, but also because of the decline of neo-Kantianism. His published and some unpublished writings were collected in a three-volume edition by his pupil Eugen Herrigel with a notice by Lask's former teacher, Rickert, in 1923 and 1924.

In Being and Time (1927), Heidegger credited Edmund Husserl as a source of inspiration for Lask, pointing to Husserl's Logical Investigations (1900–1901) as an influence on Lask's Die Logik der Philosophie und die Kategorienlehre (1911) and Die Lehre vom Urteil (1912). Lask's ideas were also influential in Japan, due to Herrigel, who lived and taught there for several years.

His sister was the poet Berta Lask.

== Works ==
- Fichtes Idealismus und die Geschichte Tübingen, 1902.
- Rechtsphilosophie in: Die Philosophie im Beginn des 20. Jahrhunderts. Festschrift für Kuno Fischer edited by Wilhelm Windelband, Heidelberg, 1907.
- Die Logik der Philosophie und die Kategorienlehre Tübingen, J.C.B. Mohr, 1911.
- Gesammelte Schriften edited by Eugen Herrigel, Tübingen: Mohr, 1923-24 (3 volumes); reprint: Jena, Scheglmann, 2002.

English translations

- Legal Philosophy in The Legal Philosophies of Lask, Radbruch, and Dabin translated by Kurt Wilk (Cambridge, Mass.; Harvard U.P., 1950; 20th Century Legal Philosophy series, vol. IV), pp. 1–42.

French translations

- La logique de la philosophie et la doctrine des catégories. Étude sur la forme logique et sa souveraineté Paris, Vrin, 2002.
