= Hermann Cohen =

German philosopher (1842–1918)

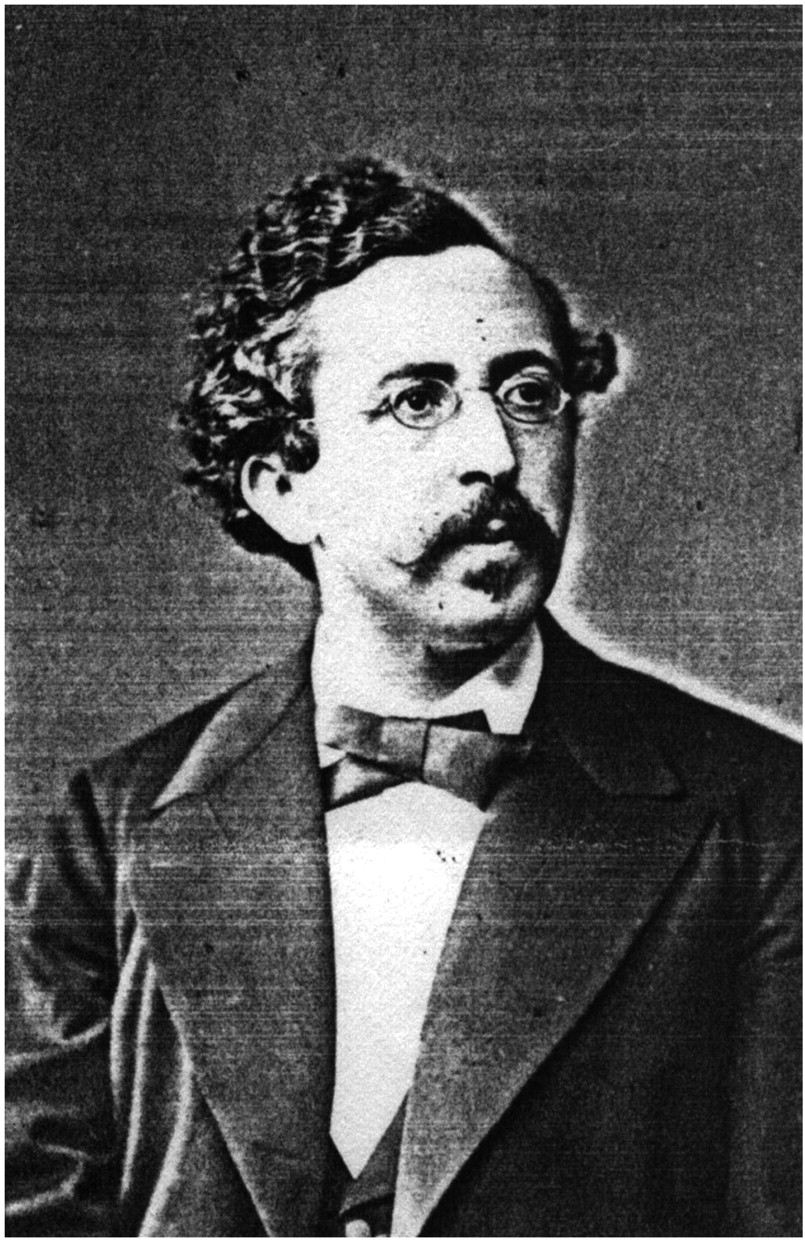
- Born: 4 July 1842; Coswig, Anhalt-Bernburg, German Confederation
- Died: 4 April 1918 (aged 75); Berlin, Kingdom of Prussia, German Empire

Education
- Education: Jewish Theological Seminary of Breslau; University of Breslau; University of Berlin; University of Halle (Dr. phil., 1865); University of Marburg (Dr. phil. hab., 1873)
- Thesis: Die Systematischen Begriffe in Kants Vorkritischen Schriften Nach Ihrem Verhältniss Zum Kritischen Idealismus (The Systematic Terms in Kant's Pre-critical Writings According to Their Relationship to Critical Idealism) (1873)
- Doctoral advisors: Friedrich Albert Lange (Dr. phil. hab. advisor)
- Other advisor: F. A. Trendelenburg

Philosophical work
- Era: 19th-century philosophy
- Region: Western philosophy
- School: Neo-Kantianism (Marburg school)
- Institutions: University of Marburg
- Doctoral students: Ernst Cassirer; Nicolai Hartmann; Paul Natorp
- Notable students: José Ortega y Gasset; Boris Pasternak; Franz Rosenzweig
- Main interests: Ethics
- Notable ideas: Principle of the infinitesimal method

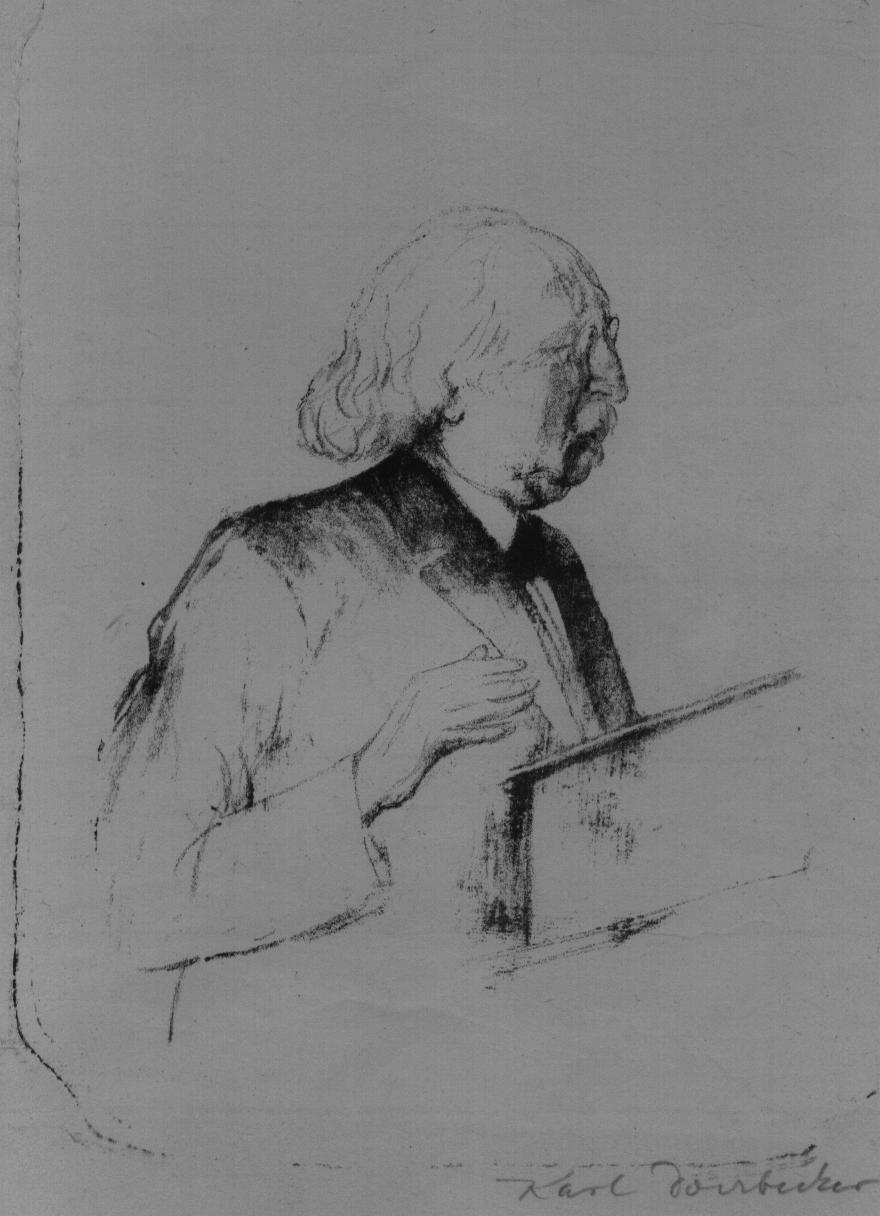
Lithograph by Karl Doerbecker

Hermann Cohen (/ˈkoʊən/; German: [ˈkoːən]; 4 July 1842 – 4 April 1918) was a German Jewish philosopher, one of the founders of the Marburg school of neo-Kantianism, and he is often held to be "probably the most important Jewish philosopher of the nineteenth century".

== Biography ==
Cohen was born on 4 July 1842, in Coswig, in Anhalt-Bernburg. He began to study philosophy early on, and soon became known as a profound Kant scholar. He was educated at the Gymnasium at Dessau, at the Jewish Theological Seminary of Breslau, and at the universities of Breslau, Berlin, and Halle. In 1873, he became Privatdozent in the philosophical faculty of the University of Marburg; the habilitation thesis with which he obtained the venia legendi being Die systematischen Begriffe in Kant's vorkritischen Schriften nach ihrem Verhältniss zum kritischen Idealismus. Cohen was elected professor extraordinarius at Marburg in 1875 and professor ordinarius the following year.

He was one of the founders of the Gesellschaft zur Förderung der Wissenschaft des Judenthums, which held its first meeting in Berlin in November 1902.

Cohen edited and published Friedrich Albert Lange's final philosophical work, Logische Studien (Leipzig, 1877), and edited and wrote several versions of a long introduction and critical supplement to Lange's Geschichte des Materialismus.

In 1878 the thirty-six-year-old Hermann Cohen married the eighteen-year-old pianist Martha Lewandowski (1860-1942). She was the daughter of Louis Lewandowski, the chief cantor of Berlin and a celebrated composer of Jewish liturgical music. Martha was deeply connected to Hermann’s life and intellectual legacy, surviving him long after his death in 1918. Tragically, as an elderly widow decades later, she became a victim of the Nazi regime and died in the Theresienstadt concentration camp during the Holocaust. The marriage between Hermann and Martha Cohen was childless.

He devoted three early volumes to the interpretation of Kant (Kant's Theory of Experience, Kant's Foundations of Ethics, and Kant's Foundations of Aesthetics). In 1902 he began publishing the three volumes of his own systematic philosophy: Logik der reinen Erkenntnis (1902), Ethik des reinen Willens (1904) and Ästhetik des reinen Gefühls (1912). The planned fourth volume on psychology was never written.

Cohen's writings relating more especially to Judaism include several pamphlets, among them "Die Kulturgeschichtliche Bedeutung des Sabbat" (1881) and "Ein Bekenntniss in der Judenfrage" (1880); as well as the following articles: "Das Problem der Jüdischen Sittenlehre" in the "Monatsschrift" xliii. (1899), pp. 385–400, 433–449; "Liebe und Gerechtigkeit in den Begriffen Gott und Mensch" in "Jahrbuch für Jüdische Geschichte und Litteratur", III. (1900), pp. 75–132; and "Autonomie und Freiheit" in Gedenkbuch für David Kaufmann (1900).

Cohen's most famous Jewish works include: Religion der Vernunft aus den Quellen des Judentums (Religion of Reason out of the Sources of Judaism, 1919), Deutschtum und Judentum, Die Naechstenliebe im Talmud, and Die Ethik des Maimonides. His essay "Die Nächstenliebe im Talmud" was written at the request of the Marburg Königliches Landgericht (3d ed., Marburg, 1888). Cohen's Jewish writings are collected in his Jüdische Schriften (3 vols. ed. Bruno Strauss, Berlin 1924). There is an ongoing new academic edition of Cohen's works, edited by Helmut Holzhey, Hartwig Wiedebach u.a. (Olms, Hildesheim 1977 ff.). Selected writings have published in English translation in Hermann Cohen: Writings on Neo-Kantianism and Jewish Philosophy (ed. by Samuel Moyn and Robert S. Schine, 2021) and in Reason and Hope: Selections from the Jewish Writings of Hermann Cohen, translated by Eva Jospe (1971).

Cohen was an outspoken critic of Zionism, as he argued that its aspiration to create a Jewish state would lead to "return the Jews to History". In his view, Judaism was inherently a-historical, with a spiritual and moral mission far transcending the national aims of Zionism. Despite his attitude, Tel Aviv has a Hermann Cohen Street.

Cohen is buried in the Weißensee Cemetery in Berlin.

== Works ==
English translations are indented.

- "Die Platonische Ideenlehre Psychologisch Entwickelt," in "Zeitschrift für Völkerpsychologie," 1866, iv. 9 ("Platonic Ideal Theorie Psychologically Developed")
- "Mythologische Vorstellungen von Gott und Seele," ib. 1869 ("Mythological Concepts of God and the Soul")
- "Die dichterische Phantasie und der Mechanismus des Bewusstseins," ib. 1869 ("Poetic Fantasy and Mechanisms of Consciousness")
- Jüdische Schriften. Introduction by Franz Rosenzweig, edited by Bruno Strauss. Berlin, C. A. Schwetschke: 1924.
  - Excerpts have been published in English translation: Reason and Hope: Selections from the Jewish Writings of Hermann Cohen. Translated by Eva Jospe. Cincinnati: Hebrew Union College Press, 1993. (Originally published New York: Norton, 1971, in series: B'nai B'rith Jewish Heritage Classics, with additional material.)
  - Selected translations from the Jüdische Schriften are found in Part Two of Hermann Cohen: Writings on Neo-Kantianism and Jewish Philosophy (edited by Samuel Moyn and Robert S. Schine. The Brandeis Library of Modern Jewish Thought. Waltham, MA: Brandeis University Press, 2021). Part One presents chapters from Ethik des reinen Willens and Part Three essays on the interpretation of Cohen by Ernst Cassirer, Franz Rosenzweig and Alexander Altmann.
- "Zur Controverse zwischen Trendelenburg und Kuno Fischer" ("On the controversy between Trendelenburg and Kuno Fischer") in Zeitschrift für Völkerpsychologie und Sprachwissenschaft, Volume 7, 1871: pp. 249–296. Google Books
- Kant's Theorie der Erfahrung, Berlin, 1871; 2nd ed., 1885; 3rd ed., published by Ernst Cassirer, 1918 ("Kant's Theory of Experience"). 1st, 2nd, 3rd editions at Google Books.
  - [One central chapter of the 1885 edition is translated as 2015, "The Synthetic Principles," D. Hyder (trans.), in S. Luft (ed.), The Neo-Kantian Reader, Oxford: Routledge.]
- Kant's Begründung der Ethik, Berlin, 1877 ("Kant's Foundations of Ethics")
- "Platon's Ideenlehre und die Mathematik," Marburg, 1878 ("Mathematics and Theory of Platonic Ideals")
- Das Prinzip der Infinitesimalmethode und seine Geschichte: ein Kapitel zur Grundlegung der Erkenntnisskritik, Berlin, 1883 ("The Principle of the Infinitesimal Method and its History: A Chapter Contributed to Critical Perception")
  - A short selection is translated as 2015, "Introduction," D. Hyder and L. Patton (trans.), in S. Luft (ed.), The Neo-Kantian Reader, Oxford: Routledge.
- Religion der Vernunft aus den Quellen des Judentums. (1919, repr. Fourier: 1995)
  - Religion of Reason out of the Sources of Judaism. Translated, with an introduction, by Simon Kaplan. Introductory essay by Leo Strauss. New York: F. Ungar, 1972.
- "Spinoza über Staat und Religion, Judentum und Christentum" (1915).
  - Spinoza on State and Religion, Judaism and Christianity. Translated and with an introduction by Robert S. Schine. Jerusalem: Shalem Press, 2014.
- "Von Kant's Einfluss auf die Deutsche Kultur," Berlin, 1883 ("On Kant's Influence on German Culture")
- Kant's Begründung der Aesthetik, Berlin, 1889 ("Kant's Foundations of Aesthetics")
- "Zur Orientierung in den Losen Blättern aus Kant's Nachlass," in "Philosophische Monatshefte," 1890, xx. ("An Orientation to the Loose Pages from Kant's Literary Estate")
- "Leopold Schmidt," in "Neue Jahrbücher für Philologie und Pädagogik," 1896, cliv.
