= Karl Ludwig Drobisch =

German composer, music theorist and church musician

- Born: 24 December 1803; Leipzig
- Died: 20 August 1854 (aged 50); Augsburg
- Education: Fürstenschule Grimma; Leipzig University
- Occupations: Composer; Music theorist; Church musician
- Organization: St. Anne's Church, Augsburg
- Relatives: Moritz Wilhelm Drobisch (brother)

Karl Ludwig Drobisch (24 December 1803 – 20 August 1854) was a German composer, music theorist and church musician. He wrote an oratorio about Saint Boniface, but it was not successful, which made him turn to composing sacred music including 18 masses.

== Biography ==
Karl Ludwig Drobisch was born on 24 December 1803 in Leipzig to Karl Wilhelm Drobisch, a Leipzig city clerk, and his second wife, Renata Dorothee Wilhelmine Klotz. He was the younger brother of Moritz Wilhelm Drobisch. The father served as the boys' teacher from a young age, and they were able to read and write, as well as perform rudimentary mathematics, before they entered the Nikolai Primary School in Leipzig. Karl and Moritz enjoyed astronomy and together calculated lunar phases and planetary movement.

Karl attended secondary school at the highly-esteemed Fürstenschule St. Augustin zu Grimma starting in 1817. He commenced studies at Leipzig University in 1821. It was here that he undertook the serious study of music theory under organist J. A. Dröbs.

In 1826 Drobisch wrote the oratorio Bonifazius, der Apostel der Deutschen, which was among the first of numerous German oratorios on the subject of Saint Boniface. The oratorio was not successful, and he traveled to Munich to study at the libraries there. He left Munich in 1837 and took the position of music director at the Church of St. Anne in Augsburg. He was not employed there long, soon resigning in order to entirely focus on composing.

Drobisch died 20 August 1854 in Augsburg.

== Compositions ==
Drobisch wrote one oratorio in 1825–1826, which was not successful. Following this his style changed, and he focused on works of a purer religious nature, including 18 masses as well as graduals, offertories and psalm settings.
