= Maksim Drobysh =

Belarusian footballer

Personal information
- Date of birth: 30 January 2001 (age 25)
- Place of birth: Vitebsk, Belarus
- Position: Midfielder

Youth career
- 2017–2019: Vitebsk

Senior career*
Years	Team	Apps	(Gls)
2019–2024	Vitebsk	39	(0)

International career^{‡}
2021	Belarus U21	2	(0)
- * Club domestic league appearances and goals as of 7 December 2024 ‡ National team caps and goals as of 29 March 2021

Maksim Drobysh (Belarusian: Максім Дробыш; Russian: Максим Дробыш; born 30 January 2001) is a Belarusian footballer, who plays for Vitebsk.
