= History of Materialism and Critique of Its Present Importance =

19th century philosophical work by Friedrich Albert Lange

History of Materialism and Critique of Its Present Importance (German: Geschichte des Materialismus und Kritik seiner Bedeutung in der Gegenwart) is a philosophical work by Friedrich Albert Lange, originally written in German and published in October 1865 (although the year of publication was given as 1866). Lange vastly extended the second edition published in two volumes in 1873–75. A three-volume English translation of the opus was published 1877–81.

== Contents ==
Adopting the Kantian standpoint that we can know nothing but phenomena, Lange maintains that neither materialism nor any other metaphysical system has a valid claim to ultimate truth. For empirical phenomenal knowledge, however, which is all that humans can look for, materialism with its exact scientific methods has done most valuable service. Ideal metaphysics, though they fail of the inner truth of things, have a value as the embodiment of high aspirations, in the same way as poetry and religion. Lange replaced the transcendental subject of Kantianism by the organism, although he considered that this substitution validated all the more Kant's philosophy that the subject apprehended the world through the categories of understanding.

Lange suggests that the methods for real science were present in Democritus's atomistic materialism. However, atomistic materialism implies that the soul, like the body, is fated to be snuffed out: such a view made Democritus quite unattractive to virtually all world religions so Democritus was ignored and marginalised by the history of philosophy, in spite of being one of the greatest thinkers of the ancient Greek world.

Lange mentions Max Stirner's book The Ego and Its Own as "the extremest that we know anywhere". He also mentioned Blanqui's L'Eternité par les astres, which discussed the thesis of an Eternal Return.

Lange's work exerted a profound influence on Friedrich Nietzsche, who aimed at radicalising Lange's viewpoint beyond Kant. At one time Nietzsche planned to write a dissertation on the notion of organism in Kant's philosophy (letter to Paul Deussen). He also envisioned sending a work on Democritus, a major focus of Lange, to Deussen.

== See also ==
- Relationship between Friedrich Nietzsche and Max Stirner
