= Alois Riehl =

Austrian philosopher (1844–1924)

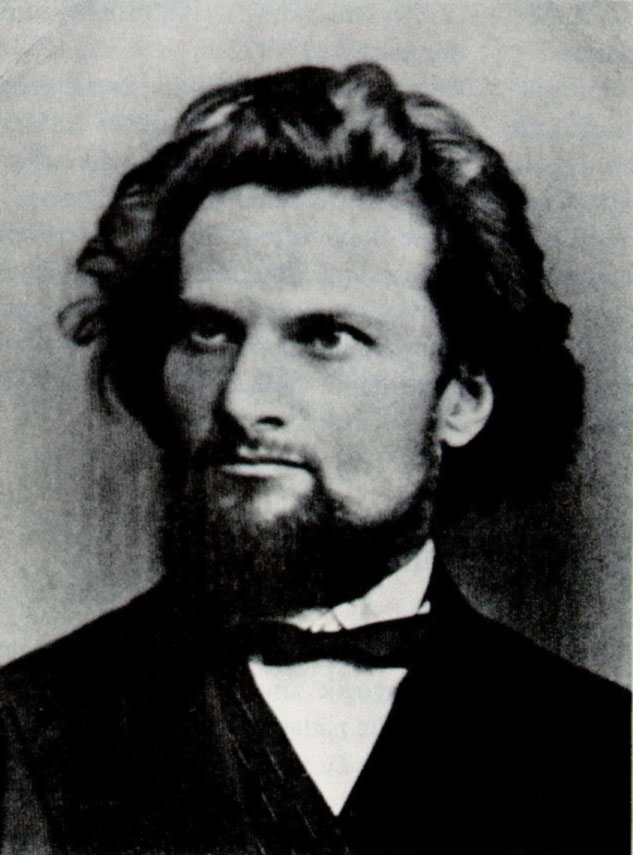
- Born: Alois Adolf Riehl; 27 April 1844; Bozen, Austrian Empire
- Died: 21 November 1924 (aged 80); Neubabelsberg, Weimar Germany
- Other name: Aloys Riehl
- Relatives: Josef Riehl (brother)

Education
- Education: University of Vienna; Ludwig-Maximilians-Universität München; University of Innsbruck (PhD, 1868); University of Graz (Dr. phil. hab., 1870)
- Thesis: Realistische Grundzüge (1870)

Philosophical work
- Era: 19th-/20th-century philosophy
- Region: Western philosophy
- School: Neo-Kantianism (Baden school); Herbartian realism (early)
- Institutions: University of Graz (1870–1882); University of Freiburg (1882–1896); Kiel University (1896–1898); University of Halle (1898–1905); Friedrich Wilhelm University of Berlin (1905–1922)
- Doctoral students: Paul Hensel; Heinrich Rickert; Oswald Spengler
- Notable students: Heinrich Scholz
- Main interests: Epistemology, philosophy of science, philosophy of perception
- Notable ideas: Critical perceptual realism Anti-psychologistic interpretation of Kantian philosophy Philosophy as criticism of perception

Alois Adolf Riehl (Austrian German: [riːl]; 27 April 1844 – 21 November 1924) was an Austrian philosopher. He was a proponent of anti-psychologism and critical perceptual realism. Riehl's early thought was shaped by the Austrian Herbartian realist context, but he later developed his own realist version of neo-Kantianism.

== Biography ==
Alois (also Aloys) Riehl was born in Bozen (Bolzano) in the Austrian Empire (now in Italy). He was the brother of the Austrian engineer and building contractor Josef Riehl.

He studied at the University of Vienna, the Ludwig-Maximilians-Universität München, the University of Innsbruck, and the University of Graz. At the University of Vienna, he attended classes taught by Robert von Zimmermann. He earned his PhD from the University of Innsbruck in 1868. He habilitated at the University of Graz in 1870.

He worked as a full professor of philosophy at the University of Graz from 1878, then at the University of Freiburg (from 1882 as a replacement for Wilhelm Windelband), Kiel University and the University of Halle, and finally at the Friedrich Wilhelm University of Berlin, where he commissioned Mies van der Rohe to design his house in Neubabelsberg.

For Riehl, philosophy was not the teaching of Weltanschauung, but principally a criticism of perception. He was the doctoral advisor of Paul Hensel and Oswald Spengler. He was also the habilitation advisor of Heinrich Rickert. Heinrich Scholz studied philosophy at Berlin under Riehl, who remained an important influence on his early thought.

Riehl died in Neubabelsberg, near Potsdam, and was buried in the Alter Friedhof in Klein Glienicke.

His wife Sofie, was the aunt of Frieda Gross, the wife of the psychoanalyst and revolutionary Otto Gross.

== Selected works ==
- Der Philosophische Kriticismus und seine Bedeutung für die positive Wissenschaft, 1876 – Philosophical criticism and its importance for the positive science.
- Beiträge zur Logik, 1892 – Contributions to logic.
- "The principles of the critical philosophy", 1894 (translated into English by Arthur Fairbanks), London: Kegan Paul, Trench, Trübner, & Co., Ltd, 1894.
- Friedrich Nietzsche, der Künstler und der Denker, 1897 – Friedrich Nietzsche: the artist and the thinker.
- Zur Einführung in die Philosophie der Gegenwart, 1903 – An introduction to the philosophy of the present.
- Systematische philosophie, 1907 (ed. by Paul Hinneberg) – Systematic philosophy.
- Der philosophische kritizismus, geschichte und system, 1908 – Philosophical criticism, history and system.
