= Wilhelm Windelband =

German philosopher (1848–1915)

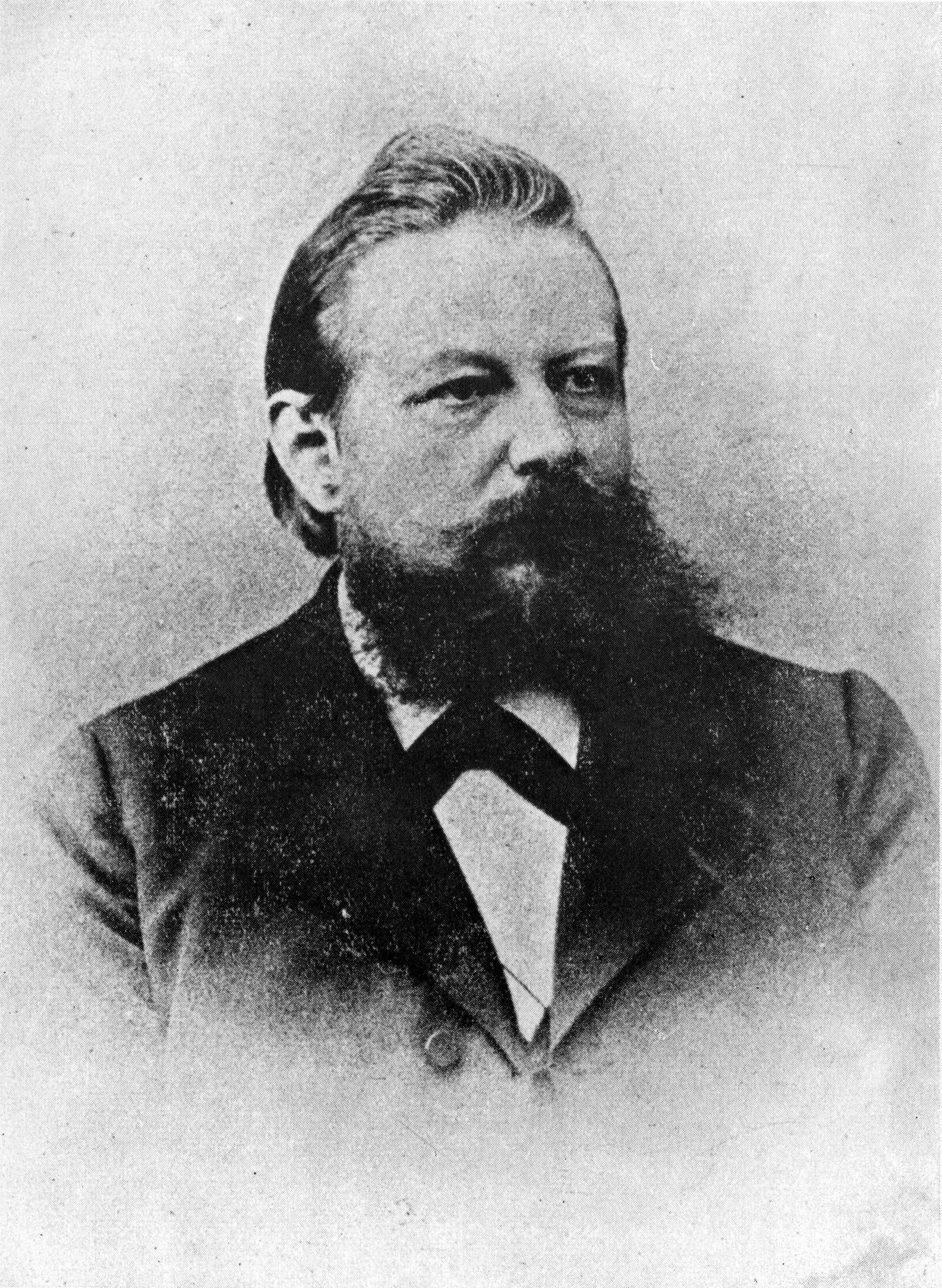
- Wilhelm Windelband, prior to 1905
- Born: 11 May 1848; Potsdam, Brandenburg, Prussia
- Died: 22 October 1915 (aged 67); Heidelberg, Grand Duchy of Baden, German Empire

Education
- Education: University of Jena; University of Berlin; University of Göttingen (Dr. phil., 1870); Leipzig University (Dr. phil. hab., 1873)
- Thesis: Die Lehren vom Zufall (The Theories of Chance) (1870)
- Doctoral advisor: Hermann Lotze
- Other advisor: Kuno Fischer

Philosophical work
- Era: 19th-century philosophy
- Region: Western philosophy
- School: Neo-Kantianism (Baden school); Foundationalism
- Institutions: University of Zürich; University of Freiburg; University of Strasbourg; University of Heidelberg
- Doctoral students: Emil Lask; Heinrich Rickert
- Notable students: Nikolay Lossky; Roy Wood Sellars
- Main interests: Metaphysics, philosophical logic
- Notable ideas: The nomothetic–idiographic distinction

Wilhelm Windelband (/ˈvɪndəlbɑːnt/; German: [ˈvɪndl̩bant]; 11 May 1848 – 22 October 1915) was a German philosopher of the Baden school.

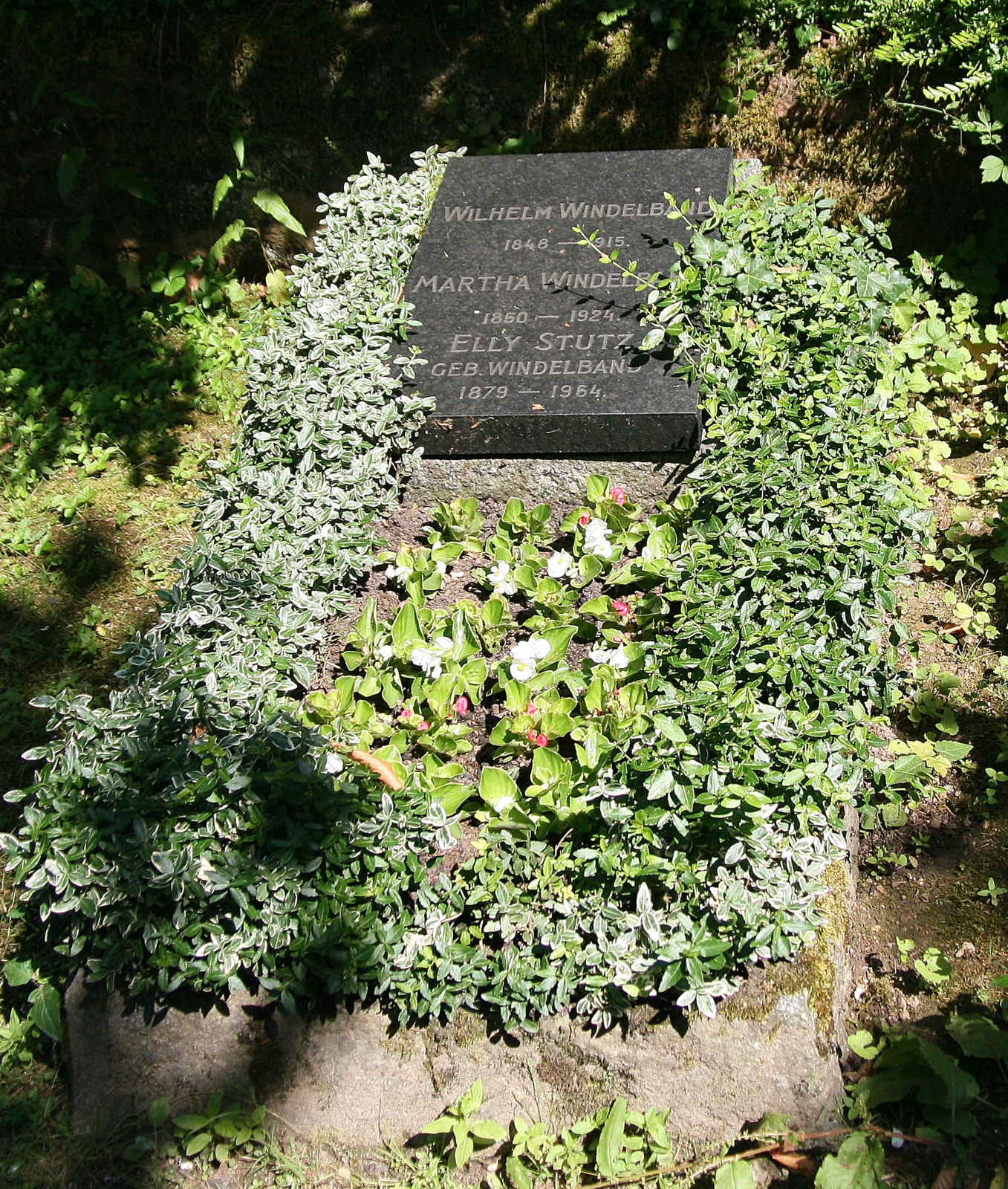
His grave in Heidelberg

== Early life ==
Windelband was born the son of a Prussian state secretary for the Province of Brandenburg in Potsdam. He studied at the University of Jena in which he attended lectures by Kuno Fischer. He later studied in the university of Berlin and of Göttingen. In 1870 he presented his Dr. phil. dissertation under the direction of Hermann Lotze, which was entitled Die Lehren vom Zufall (The Theories of Chance). In the following year Windelband served as a soldier in the Franco-Prussian War. In 1873 he returned to academia and obtained his Dr. phil. habil. at the University of Leipzig, which was entitled Die Gewissheit der Erkenntnis: eine psychologisch-erkenntnisstheoretische Studie (On the Certainty of Knowledge: A Psychological-Epistemological Study). In 1874 he married Martha Wichgraf, with whom he had four children.

In 1876, Windelband became Professor of Inductive Philosophy at the University of Zurich in Switzerland. In 1877, he returned to Germany, where he became Professor of Philosophy at the University of Freiburg. In 1882 he accepted an offer of a post in the then-German University of Strasbourg, where in 1894/5 and 1897/98 he became its rector.

== Philosophical work ==
Windelband is now mainly remembered for the terms nomothetic and idiographic, which he introduced during an address which he gave in 1894 upon his installation as the Rector of the University of Strasbourg, the Third Edition of which was subsequently published as a thirty-six page booklet. The terms nomothetic and idiographic are used in psychology and elsewhere. However, as three authors, Smith (1995), Lamiell (1998) and Robinson (2012), have explained, they are used differently to the ways that Windelband meant.

Windelband was a neo-Kantian who argued against other contemporary neo-Kantians, maintaining that "to understand Kant rightly means to go beyond him". Against his positivist contemporaries, Windelband argued that philosophy should engage in humanistic dialogue with the natural sciences rather than uncritically appropriating its methodologies. His interests in psychology and cultural sciences represented an opposition to psychologism and historicism schools by a critical philosophic system.

Windelband relied in his effort to reach beyond Kant on such philosophers as Georg Wilhelm Friedrich Hegel, Johann Friedrich Herbart, and Hermann Lotze. Heinrich Rickert was closely associated with Windelband. Windelband's disciples were not only noted philosophers, but also sociologists like Max Weber and theologians like Ernst Troeltsch and Albert Schweitzer.

== Bibliography ==
- A history of philosophy Volume 1 (Revised ed.). New York: Harper & Brothers. 1901 [originally 1893].
- A history of philosophy Volume II (Revised ed.). New York: Harper & Brothers. 1901 [originally 1893].
- An introduction to philosophy. London: T. Fisher Unwin. 1921 [originally 1914]. Translated by Joseph McCabe.
- History of ancient philosophy (Second German ed.). New York: Charles Scribner's Sons. 1899 [originally 1893]. Translated by Herbert Ernest Cushman.
- Theories in logic. New York: The Citadel Press. 1961 [originally 1912].

A full list of Windelband's books in German is available at The Online Books Page.

== See also ==
- Heinz Heimsoeth
