= Benno Kerry =

Austrian philosopher

- Born: Benno Kohn; 11 December 1858; Vienna, Austrian Empire
- Died: 20 May 1889 (aged 30); Vienna, Austria-Hungary

Education
- Education: University of Strassburg; University of Vienna

Philosophical work
- Era: 19th-century philosophy
- Region: Western philosophy
- School: School of Brentano
- Main interests: Epistemology
- Notable ideas: Distinction between two types of modes in which the human mind manifests itself: intuition (Anschauung) and psychical labor (psychische Arbeit) or psychical processing (psychische Verarbeitung); Kerry's paradox

Benno Kerry (Austrian German: [ˈkɛri]; né Kohn; 11 December 1858 – 20 May 1889) was an Austrian philosopher.

== Life ==
Kerry was born as Benno Kohn in Vienna. He studied under Ernst Laas and Otto Liebmann at the University of Strassburg and from 1877/78 under Franz Brentano at the University of Vienna. In 1881 he obtained his doctorate with the dissertation Untersuchungen über das Causalproblem auf dem Boden einer Kritik der einschlägigen Lehren J. St. Mills ("Investigations concerning the problem of causality on the basis of a critique of the relevant doctrines of John Stuart Mill"). In Vienna, as part of the School of Brentano he befriended Alois Höfler.

In 1885 he obtained his habilitation as Privatdozent in Strasburg with Grundzüge einer Theorie der mathematischen und nicht-mathematischen Grenzbegriffe. Ein Beitrag zur Erkenntnistheorie ("Foundations of a theory of mathematical and non-mathematical limit concepts. A contribution to epistemology") and became the assistant of the neo-Kantian Wilhelm Windelband.

Kerry was influenced by Bernard Bolzano and became an important conduit of his work. He was among the first students of Brentano (with Meinong and Höfler) to distinguish clearly between concept and object.

Kerry died on 20 May 1889 as a result of an ear infection.

Kerry was double first cousins with Fritz Kerry, who was the father of Richard Kerry and grandfather of John Kerry.

== Influence ==
Kerry exercised an influence not just within the circle of Brentano, especially on Alois Höfler (for the concept "psychical labor"), Edmund Husserl (in the Philosophy of Arithmetic), and Kazimierz Twardowski, but also on Gottlob Frege. In fact, Frege conceived his paper "Concept and Object" as a reply to Kerry's criticisms. Furthermore he was in close contact with Georg Cantor and it is thanks to his review of the Mannigfaltigkeitslehre that Bertrand Russell came to know of the work of Cantor.

=== Kerry and Frege ===
Kerry (in particular in his fourth article) criticized Frege for having confused concept and object in his Die Grundlagen der Arithmetik and in Begriffsschrift. Frege responded to a number of aspects of this critique in 1892 with the paper "Begriff und Gegenstand" ("Concept and Object"). The controversy became known as the "concept horse problem" or "Kerry's paradox."

== Works ==
- Untersuchungen über das Causalproblem auf dem Boden einer Kritik der einschlägigen Lehren J. St. Mills 1881.
- Grundzüge einer Theorie der mathematischen und nicht-mathematischen Grenzbegriffe. Ein Beitrag zur Erkenntnistheorie (unpublished Habilitationsschrift)
- Review of "Paul du Bois-Reymond Allgemeine Functionentheorie. Erster Theil Tübingen 1882" in Vierteljahrsschrift für wissenschaftliche Philosophie, 9, 1885, pp. 245–255.
- "Ueber G. Cantor's Mannigfaltigkeitsuntersuchungen" in Vierteljahrsschrift für wissenschaftliche Philosophie, 9 (1885), 191–232.
- "Ueber Anschauung und ihre psychische Verarbeitung" in Vierteljahrsschrift für wissenschaftliche Philosophie, 9 (1885), 433–493; 10 (1886), 419–467; 11 (1887), 53–116, 249–307; 13 (1889), 71–124, 392–419; 14 (1890), 317–353; 15 (1891), 127–167. (Series of eight articles)
- (ed.) Ernst Laas' Literarischer Nachlaß: I. Idealistische und positivistische Ethik. II. Oekonomische Mängel unseres nationalen Bildungswesens. III. Gymnasium und Realschule Verlag der "Deutschen Worte": Wien: 1887
- (posthumous publication) System einer Theorie der Grenzbegriffe. Ein Beitrag zur Erkenntnisstheorie. Erster Theil, ed. by Gustav Kohn, Franz Deuticke Verlag, Leipzig-Wien 1890.
