= Paul Natorp =

German philosopher and historian (1854–1924)

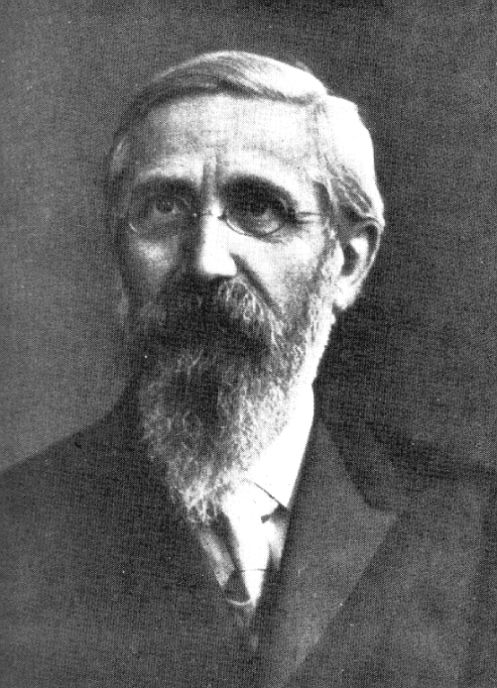
- Born: Paul Gerhard Natorp; 24 January 1854; Düsseldorf, Rhine Province, Kingdom of Prussia, German Confederation
- Died: 17 August 1924 (aged 70); Marburg, Province of Hesse-Nassau, Free State of Prussia, Weimar Germany

Education
- Education: University of Strasbourg
- Thesis: Descartes' Erkenntnistheorie: Eine Studie zur Vorgeschichte des Kriticismus (Descartes's Theory of Knowledge: A Study in the Pre-history of Criticism) (1882)
- Doctoral advisor: Ernst Laas (PhD advisor); Hermann Cohen (Dr. phil. hab. advisor)
- Other advisor: Hermann Usener

Philosophical work
- Era: 19th-century philosophy
- Region: Western philosophy
- School: Neo-Kantianism (Marburg school)
- Institutions: Marburg University
- Doctoral students: Ernst Cassirer; Hans-Georg Gadamer; Nicolai Hartmann
- Notable students: Karl Barth; Elisabeth Blochmann; José Ortega y Gasset
- Main interests: Philosophical logic
- Notable ideas: Anti-psychologism

Paul Gerhard Natorp (/ˈneɪtɔːrp/; German: [ˈnaːtoːrp]; 24 January 1854 – 17 August 1924) was a German philosopher and educationalist, considered one of the co-founders of the Marburg school of neo-Kantianism. He was known as an authority on Plato.

== Biography ==
Paul Natorp was born in Düsseldorf, the son of the Protestant minister Adelbert Natorp and his wife Emilie Keller. From 1871 he studied music, history, classical philology and philosophy in Berlin, Bonn and Strasbourg. He completed his doctoral dissertation in 1876 at the University of Strasbourg under the supervision of the philosopher Ernst Laas and in 1881 completed his Habilitation under the neo-Kantian Hermann Cohen. In 1885 he became an extraordinary professor and in 1893 became an ordinary professor in philosophy and pedagogy at Marburg University, a position he retained until his retirement in 1922. In the winter semester of 1923–24 Natorp conducted an intensive exchange of ideas with Martin Heidegger, who had been called to Marburg and whose work on Duns Scotus Natorp had read very early on.

In 1887 he married his cousin Helene Natorp; they had five children. Natorp was an ambitious composer, who wrote chiefly chamber music (including a cello sonata, a violin sonata, and a piano trio). He also wrote some 100 songs and two choral works. He conducted a correspondence with Johannes Brahms, who dissuaded him from becoming a professional composer.

He was an influence on the early work of Hans-Georg Gadamer and had a profound effect on the thought of Edmund Husserl, the "father" of phenomenology. His students included the philosopher and historian Ernst Cassirer, the theologian Karl Barth and the author of Doctor Zhivago, Boris Pasternak.

== Works ==
- Descartes' Erkenntnistheorie. Eine Studie zur Vorgeschichte des Kriticismus. 1882; 2014, ISBN 978-3-944253-04-6
- Sozialpädagogik (1899)
- Platos Ideenlehre (1903; 2nd ed. 1921); English transl. 2004, Plato's Theory of Ideas: An Introduction to Idealism., Academia Verlag ISBN 978-3-89665250-8
- Logik in Leitsätzen (1904)
- Gesammelte Abhandlungen zur Sozialpädagogik (3 volumes, 1907)
- Pestalozzi. Leben und Lehre (1909)
- Die logischen Grundlagen der exakten Wissenschaften (1910)
- Philosophie; ihr Problem und ihre Probleme (1911), new edition: Edition Ruprecht, Göttingen 2008 (ed. and introduction by Karl-Heinz Lembeck), ISBN 978-3-7675-3055-3
- Sozialidealismus (1920)
- Beethoven und wir (1920)
- Allgemeine Logik (in: Flach und Holzhey, Erkenntnistheorie und Logik im Neukantianismus, 1979)
