= Heinrich Liebmann =

German mathematician and geometer

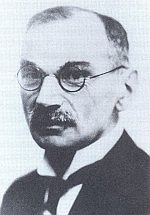
- Born: Karl Otto Heinrich Liebmann; 22 October 1874; Strasbourg, Alsace–Lorraine, German Empire
- Died: 12 June 1939 (aged 64); Munich-Solln, Germany
- Education: Leipzig University; University of Jena; University of Göttingen
- Known for: Liebmann's theorem
- Father: Otto Liebmann
- Scientific career
- Fields: Differential geometry
- Workplaces: University of Göttingen; Leipzig University; Technical University of Munich; Heidelberg University
- Doctoral advisor: Carl Johannes Thomae

Karl Otto Heinrich Liebmann (German: [ˈliːpman]; 22 October 1874 – 12 June 1939) was a German mathematician specializing in differential geometry.

== Life ==
Liebmann was the son of Otto Liebmann (1840–1912), a Jewish neo-Kantian philosophy professor at the University of Jena. Heinrich studied from 1895 to 1897 at the universities Leipzig, Jena and Göttingen. In 1895 he was awarded the doctorate under Carl Johannes Thomae with the subject Die einzweideutigen projektiven Punktverwandtschaften der Ebene and passed the Lehramtsprüfung in 1896. In 1897 he was an assistant in Göttingen and in 1898 in Leipzig, where he was habilitated on the subject Über die Verbiegung der geschlossenen Flächen positiver Krümmung. In this work, among other things, he stated Liebmann's theorem in differential geometry.

In 1905, he became extraordinary professor in Leipzig, in 1910 extraordinary professor at the Technischen Hochschule München, where he became professor in 1915. In 1920 he followed Paul Stäckel as professor at the Universität Heidelberg, where he became rector in 1926 and dean of the faculty of mathematics and natural science in 1923/1924 as well as in 1928/1929. In 1935 he asked for retirement due to political pressure of the national socialists because of Liebmann's Jewish ancestry. He and his colleague Arthur Rosenthal were boycotted in his faculty. He spent his last years in Munich.

In 1913 he married his first wife Natalie Liebmann, née Kraus († 1924), who was the daughter of Karl Kraus, professor of agricultural science in Munich. After the death of his first wife he married Helene Ehlers. He had four children.

Liebmann was concerned, among other things, with differential geometry and non-Euclidean geometry. He discovered the construction of a triangle from its three angles by circle and ruler within hyperbolic geometry. In his habilitation, he showed that a convex closed surface cannot be bent (theorem of Minding and Liebmann's theorem). He translated the works of Nikolai Lobachevsky into German.

Liebmann was a member of the Saxon Academy of Sciences, the Bavarian Academy of Sciences and Humanities and the Heidelberg Academy of Sciences and Humanities.

== Bibliography ==
- Gottlob Kirschmer (1985). "Liebmann, Heinrich". Neue Deutsche Biographie (in German). Vol. 14. Berlin: Duncker & Humblot. p. 508. (full text online).
- Siegfried Gottwald, Hans J. Ilgauds, Karl H. Schlote (Hrsg.): Lexikon bedeutender Mathematiker. Bibliographisches Institut, Leipzig 1990, ISBN 3-323-00319-5.
- Gabriele Dörflinger: Heinrich Liebmann – Mathematiker. In: Badische Biographien, Neue Folge, Band 6 (2011), S. 258–259. (Manuskript.)
- Dorothee Mußgnug: Die vertriebenen Heidelberger Dozenten : zur Geschichte der Ruprecht-Karls-Universität nach 1933. Heidelberg 1988
- Heinrich Liebmann: Die Notwendigkeit der Freiheit in der Mathematik (Leipziger Antrittsvorlesung) in: Herbert Beckert, Walter Purkert Leipziger mathematische Antrittsvorlesungen. Auswahl aus den Jahren 1869-1922, B. G. Teubner, Leipzig 1987 (mit Biografie)
