= Fürstenwalde Solar Park =

Photovoltaic power station in Germany

- Country: Germany
- Location: Fürstenwalde
- Coordinates: 52°23′34″N 14°05′45″E
- Status: Operational
- Commission date: 2011
- Construction cost: €76 million

Solar farm
- Type: Flat-panel PV
- Site area: 89 ha (220 acres) Footprint

Power generation
- Units operational: 173,712 Suntech
- Nameplate capacity: 39.64 MW_{p}
- Annual net output: 36.5 GWh

The Fürstenwalde Solar Park is a photovoltaic power station in Fürstenwalde, Germany. It has a capacity of 39.64 megawatt (MW) and an annual output of 36.5 GWh. The solar park was developed by the company Solarhybrid and built by conecon using 62,832 225-watt and 110,880 230-watt solar panels, both manufactured by Suntech.

The PV project was built on a former military airfield on 89 hectares (220 acres), and was completed in 10 weeks only.

== See also ==
- List of photovoltaic power stations
