= Fürstenwalde =

Fürstenwalde/Spree
- Town
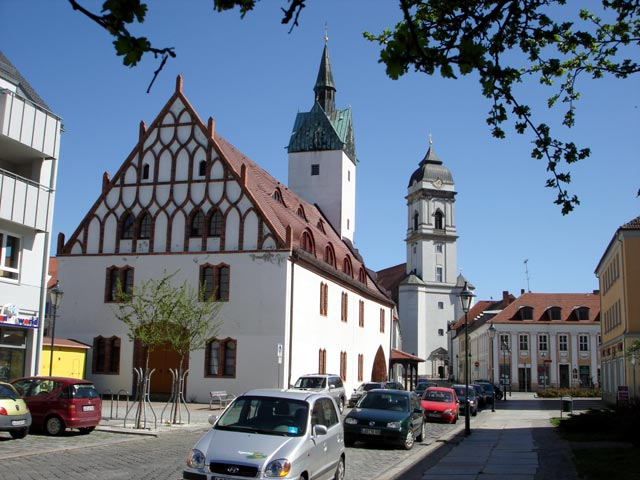
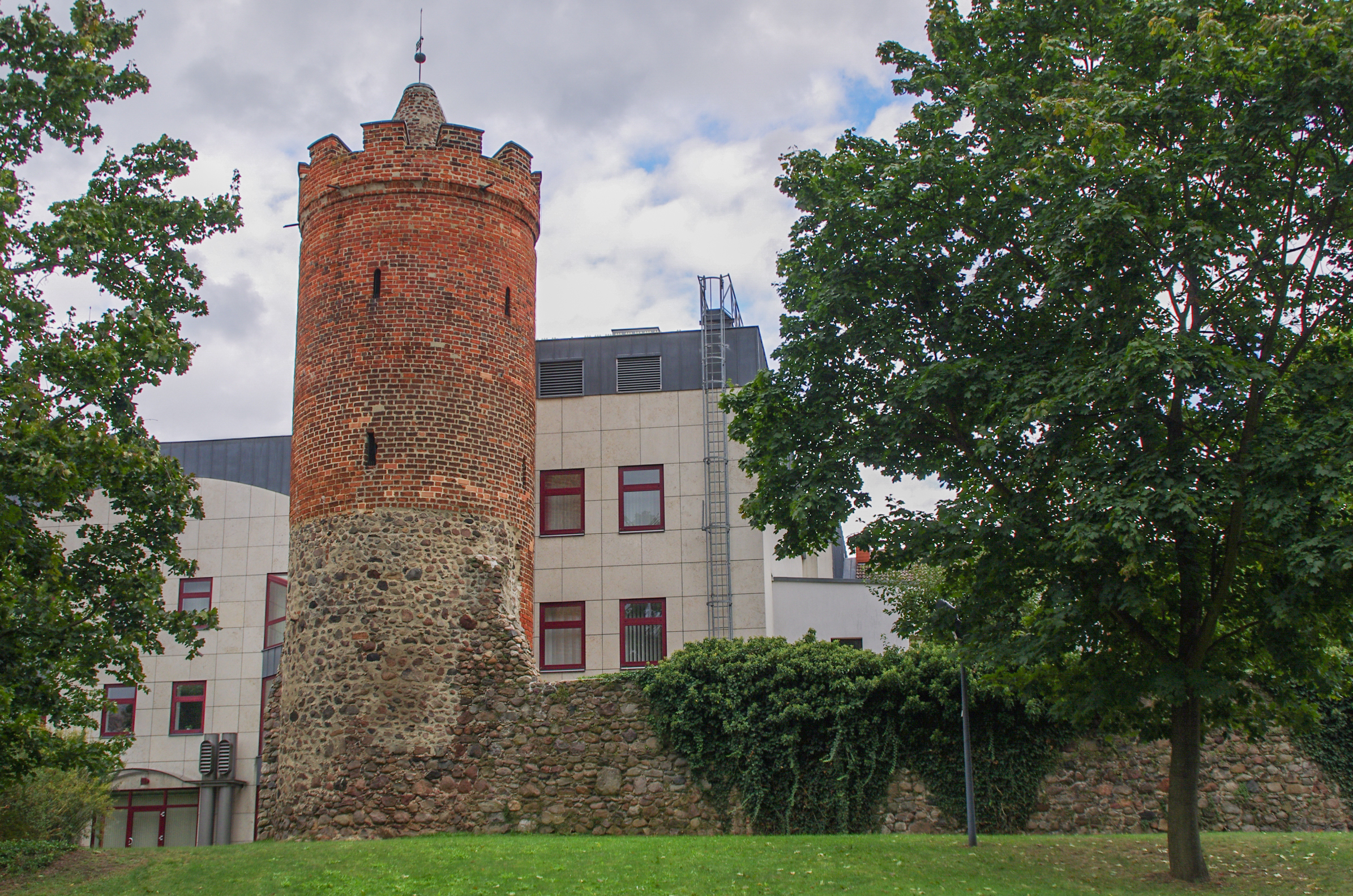
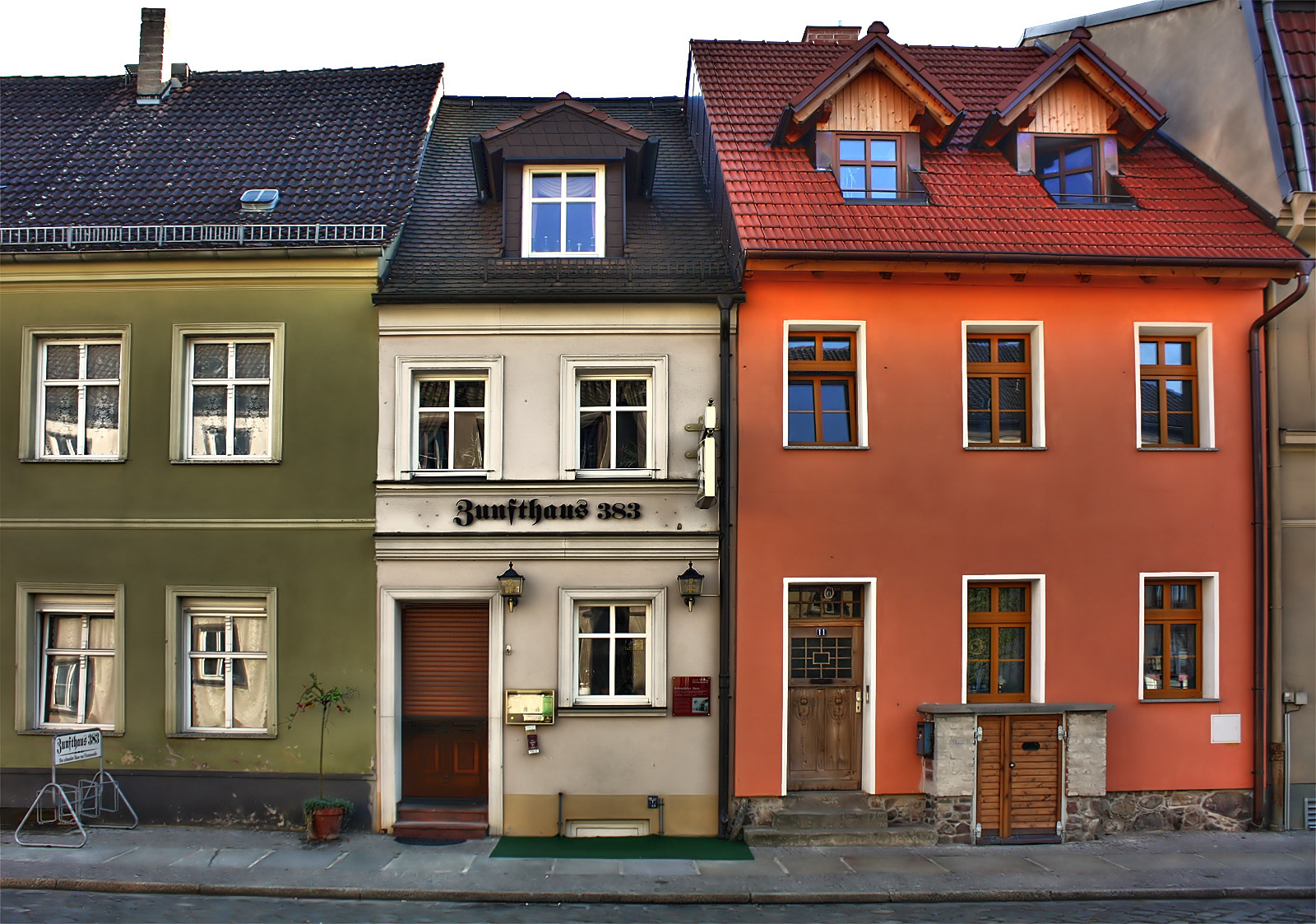
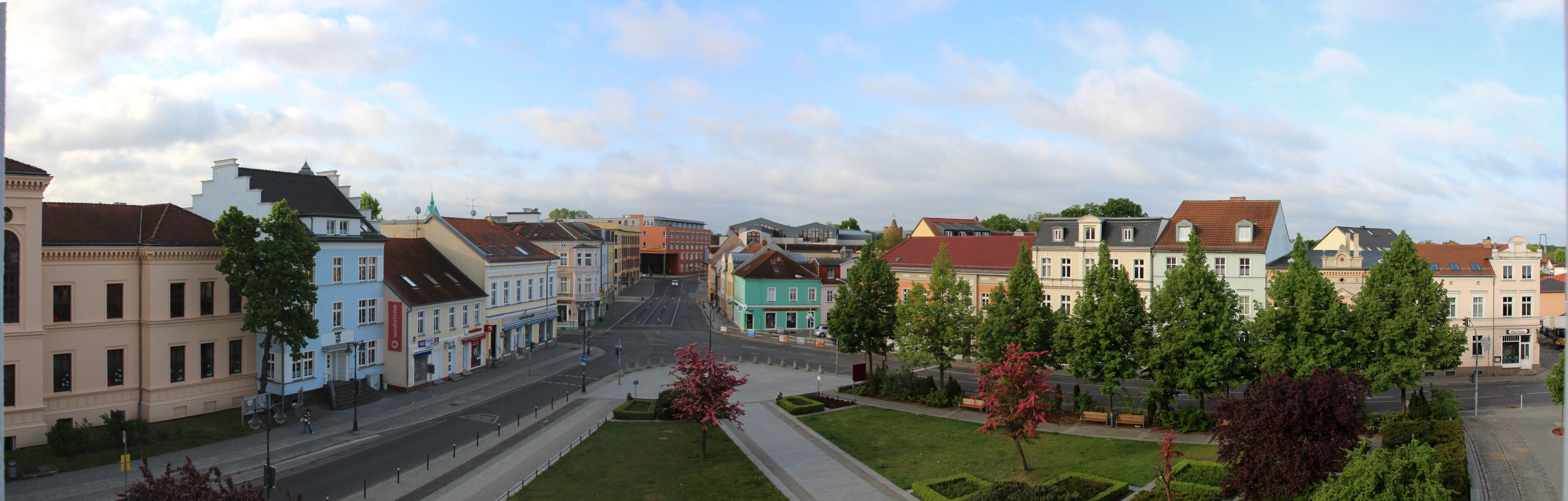
- Town hall and Cathedral Bullenturm, part of Fürstenwalde fortress Narrowest House in Fürstenwalde Panoramic view city centre

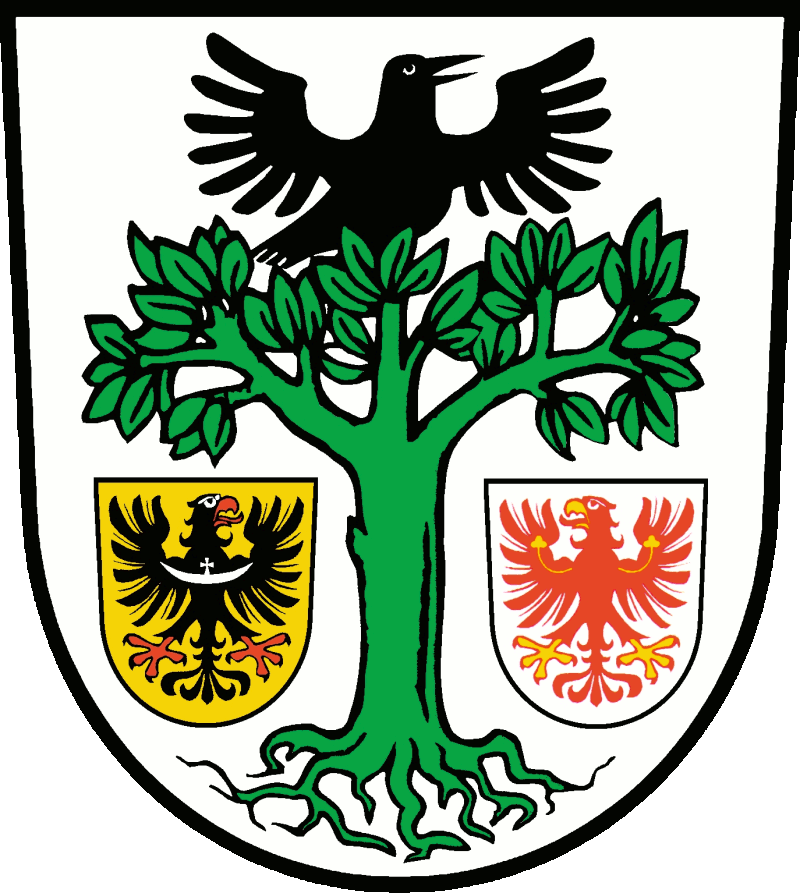
- Coat of arms

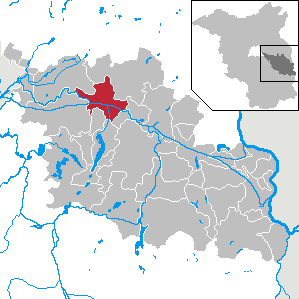
- Location of Fürstenwalde/Spree within Oder-Spree district
- Interactive map of Fürstenwalde/Spree
- Location within Germany Location within Brandenburg
- Coordinates: 52°22′N 14°04′E
- Country: Germany
- State: Brandenburg
- District: Oder-Spree
- Subdivisions: City center and 4 districts

Government
  - Mayor (2018–26): Matthias Rudolph

Area
  - Total: 70.68 km^{2} (27.29 sq mi)
- Elevation: 43 m (141 ft)

Population (2025-12-31)
  - Total: 31,981
  - Density: 452.5/km^{2} (1,172/sq mi)
- Time zone: UTC+01:00 (CET)
  - Summer (DST): UTC+02:00 (CEST)
- Postal codes: 15517
- Dialling codes: 03361
- Vehicle registration: LOS
- Website: https://www.fuerstenwalde-spree.de/

Fürstenwalde/Spree (German pronunciation: [ˈfʏʁstn̩ˌvaldə]; Lower Sorbian: Pśibor pśi Sprjewje [ˈpɕibɔr ˈpɕi sprʲɛwʲɛ]) is the most populous town in the Oder-Spree District of Brandenburg, in eastern Germany.

== Geography ==
The town is situated in the glacial valley (Urstromtal) of the Spree river north of the Rauen Hills, about 60 km (37 mi) east of Berlin and 30 km (19 mi) west of Frankfurt (Oder). The district capital Beeskow is about 25 km (16 mi) to the southeast. In the north, the municipal area comprises the village of Trebus. The town is located on the western part of historic Lubusz Land (Land Lebus).

The Fürstenwalde station is a stop on the railway line from Berlin to Frankfurt (Oder), the former Lower Silesian-Marcher Railway. It also has access to the parallel Bundesautobahn 12. The 39 MW Fürstenwalde Solar Park supplies electricity to the local grid.

== History ==
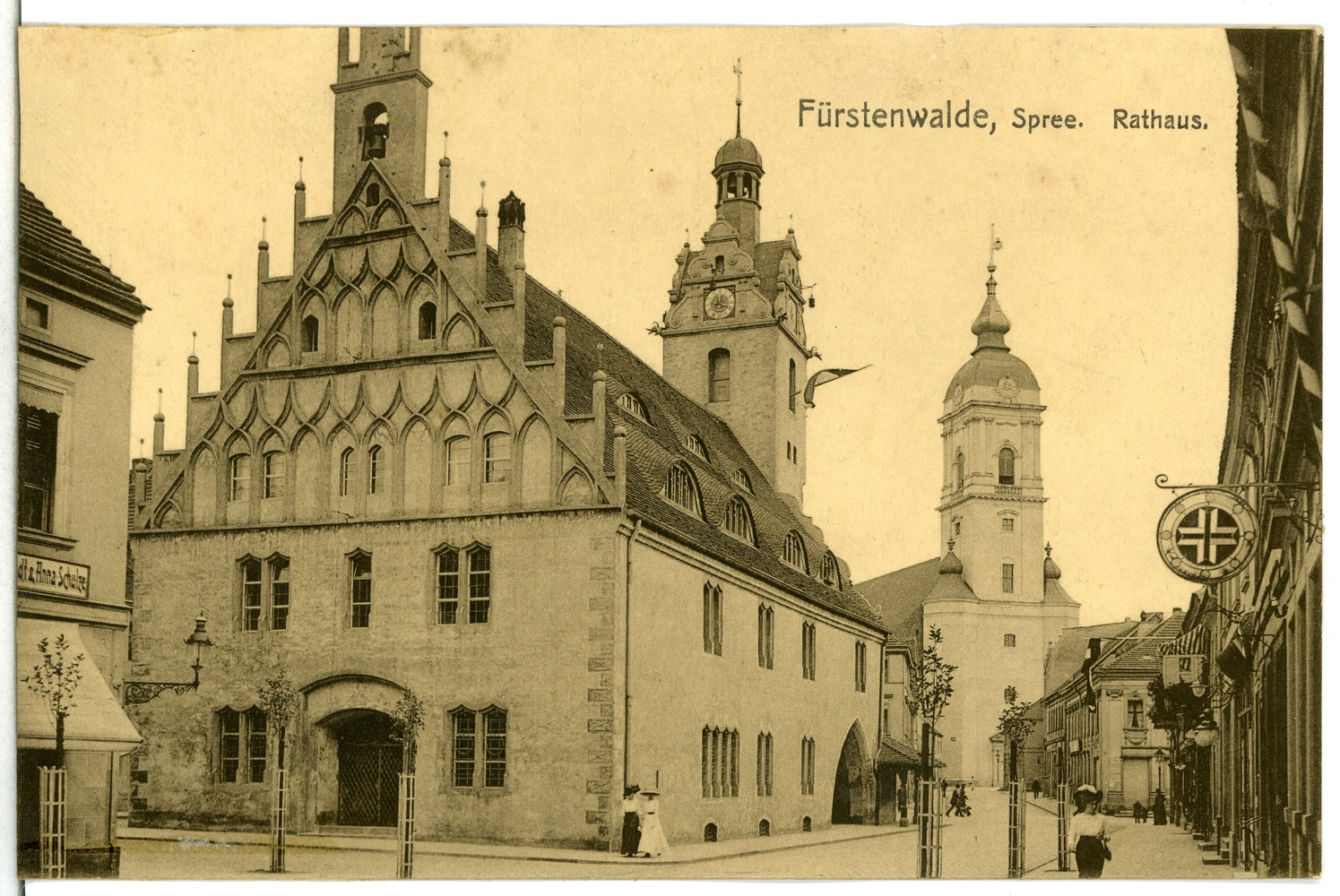
Postcard from 1911

The settlement of Fürstenwalde was first mentioned in a 1272 deed, founded in the course of the German Ostsiedlung migration at a ford across the Spree river, probably near the site of a former Slavic settlement. The Lebus Land had been acquired from Poland by the Ascanian margraves of Brandenburg in 1248/1249. The town's importance rose as a staple port and terminal of the transportation of goods on the river.

In 1373 Emperor Charles IV, since 1367 also Margrave of adjacent Lower Lusatia campaigned the Brandenburg lands and enforced the renunciation of the Wittelsbach margrave Otto VII of Brandenburg by the Treaty of Fürstenwalde. From 1373 to 1415, the town was part of the Bohemian Crown. As also the collegiate church in Lebus was destroyed, Bishop Wenceslaus moved the official seat of the Bishopric of Lebus to Fürstenwalde, where the St Mary's Church was raised to a cathedral.

The last Catholic bishop was Georg von Blumenthal (1490–1550), who was besieged in his palace by Lutheran robbers led by Nickel von Minckwitz. The Bishop had to escape through a window in disguise. The bishopric was secularized during the Reformation in 1555, and was completely disbanded at the ascension of Joachim Frederick as Margrave of Brandenburg in 1598.

From the 18th century, Fürstenwalde was part of the Kingdom of Prussia, and from 1815 to 1947, it was administratively located in the Province of Brandenburg. In the early 18th century, a commune of French Huguenots was established in the town. During World War II, it was the location of a subcamp of the Sachsenhausen concentration camp. From 1947 to 1952 it was part of the State of Brandenburg, from 1952 to 1990 of the Bezirk Frankfurt of East Germany and since 1990 again of Brandenburg.

== Demography ==
Development of Population since 1875 within the Current Boundaries (Blue Line: Population; Dotted Line: Comparison to Population Development of Brandenburg state; Grey Background: Time of Nazi rule; Red Background: Time of Communist rule)

Recent Population Development and Projections (Population Development before Census 2011 (blue line); Recent Population Development according to the Census in Germany in 2011 (blue bordered line); Official projections for 2005–2030 (yellow line); for 2017–2030 (scarlet line); for 2020–2030 (green line)

Fürstenwalde/Spree: Population development
within the current boundaries (2020)

Year	Pop.	±% p.a.
1875	11,929	—
1890	15,783	+1.88%
1910	26,286	+2.58%
1925	28,369	+0.51%
1939	35,842	+1.68%
1950	30,815	−1.36%
1964	30,849	+0.01%

Year	Pop.	±% p.a.
1971	31,296	+0.21%
1981	35,566	+1.29%
1985	35,443	−0.09%
1990	35,214	−0.13%
1995	33,628	−0.92%
2000	34,044	+0.25%
2005	33,336	−0.42%

Year	Pop.	±% p.a.
2010	32,468	−0.53%
2015	31,741	−0.45%
2016	32,025	+0.89%
2017	32,098	+0.23%
2018	31,941	−0.49%
2019	31,965	+0.08%
2020	31,992	+0.08%

== Politics ==
Seats in the town's assembly (Stadtverordnetenversammlung) as of 2014 local elections:

- The Left: 7
- Christian Democratic Union of Germany (CDU): 6
- Social Democratic Party of Germany (SPD): 6
- Free Voters (BFZ): 5
- Free Democratic Party (FDP): 3
- Alternative for Germany (AfD): 2
- Alliance 90/The Greens: 2
- Pirate Party Germany: 1

== Twin towns – sister cities ==
Fürstenwalde is twinned with:

- Choszczno, Poland
- Reinheim, Germany
- Sulechów, Poland

== Notable people ==
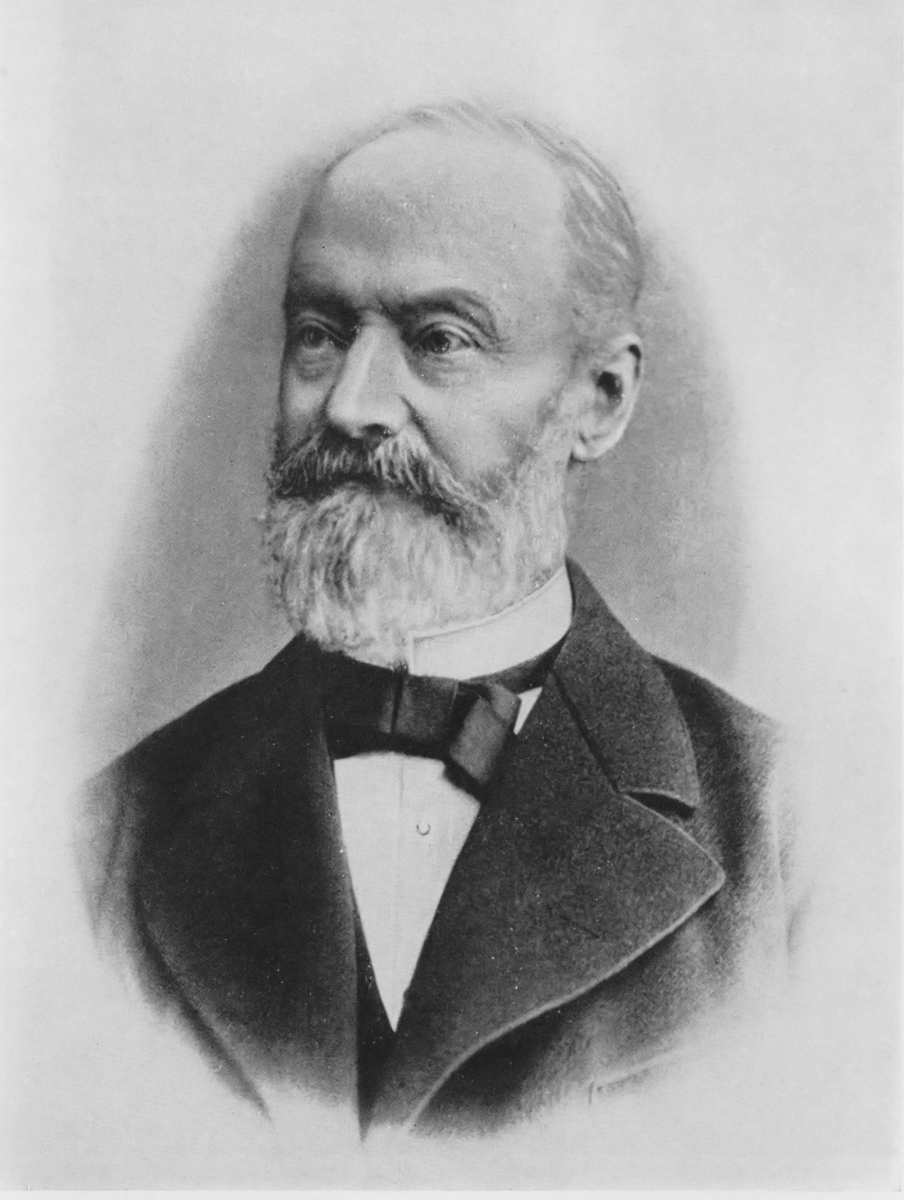
Julius Pintsch

- Karl Friedrich Schulz (1784–1850), Protestant composer and music teacher
- Julius Pintsch (1815–1884), founder of the former industrial company Julius Pintsch AG Berlin-Fürstenwalde
- Ernst Laas (1837–1885), pedagogue and philosopher
- Wilhelm Burgdorf (1895–1945), general of the infantry
- Wolfgang Götze (1937–2021), theoretical physicist
- Hans-Michael Rehberg (1938–2017), actor and film director
- Helmut Panke (born 1946), manager
- Burkhard Reich (born 1964), footballer
- Axel Schulz (born 1968), boxer
