= Otto Liebmann =

German philosopher (1840–1912)

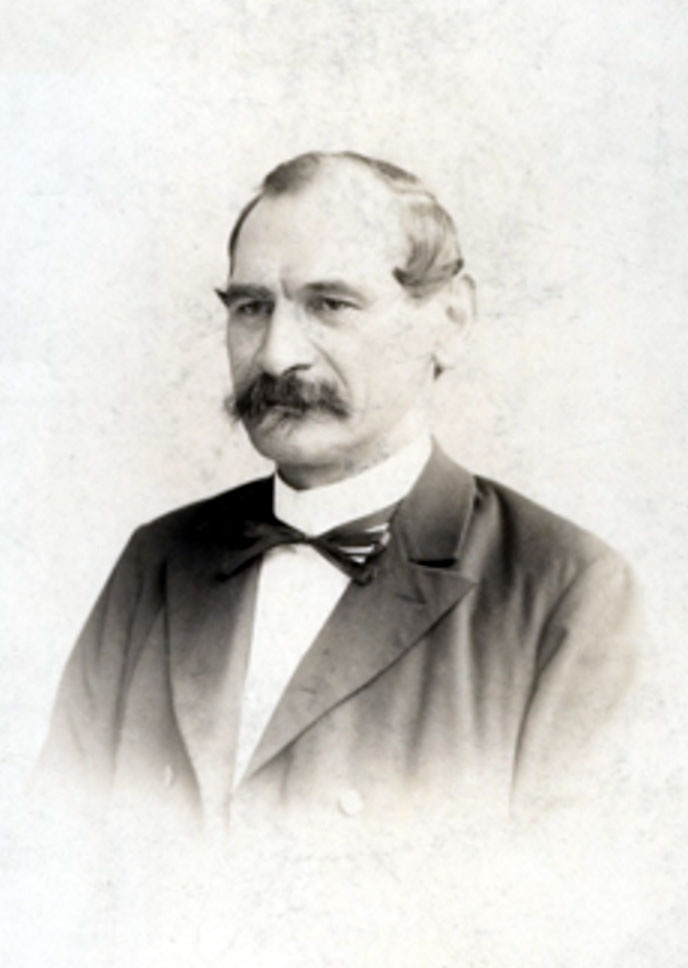
- Born: Friedrich Ernst Otto Liebmann; 25 February 1840; Löwenberg, Province of Silesia, Kingdom of Prussia
- Died: 14 January 1912 (aged 71); Jena, Saxe-Weimar-Eisenach, German Empire
- Children: 2, including Heinrich

Education
- Education: University of Jena; Leipzig University; University of Halle
- Academic advisor: Kuno Fischer

Philosophical work
- Era: 19th-century philosophy
- Region: Western philosophy
- School: Neo-Kantianism
- Institutions: University of Tübingen; University of Strasbourg; University of Jena
- Main interests: Epistemology; Metaphysics
- Notable ideas: Criticism of post-Kantian idealism

Friedrich Ernst Otto Liebmann (German: [ˈliːpman]; 25 February 1840 – 14 January 1912) was a German neo-Kantian philosopher.

== Biography ==
Otto Liebmann was born in Löwenberg, Silesia, into a Jewish family, and educated at Jena, Leipzig and Halle. At Jena, he was a student of Kant scholar Kuno Fischer.

Liebmann was made professor at Strassburg in 1872 and at Jena in 1882.

He died in Jena.

The mathematician Heinrich Liebmann was his son and the physician Otto Liebmann is his eponymous great-grandson.

== Philosophical work ==
A forerunner of neo-Kantianism, in his best-known book, Kant und die Epigonen (1865), he deals with the philosophy after Kant, discussing Fichte, Schelling, Hegel, Fries, Herbart and Schopenhauer. Having credited Kant's philosophy (though criticizing it on the vital point of accepting a thing-in-itself), he focuses on what he sees as the shortcomings in the approaches of Kants successors. He frequently ends a section with the statement that one should return to Kant.

Kant is, without a doubt, the most significant thinker of the Christian period.

Liebmann's work also influenced his Jena colleague Gottlob Frege.

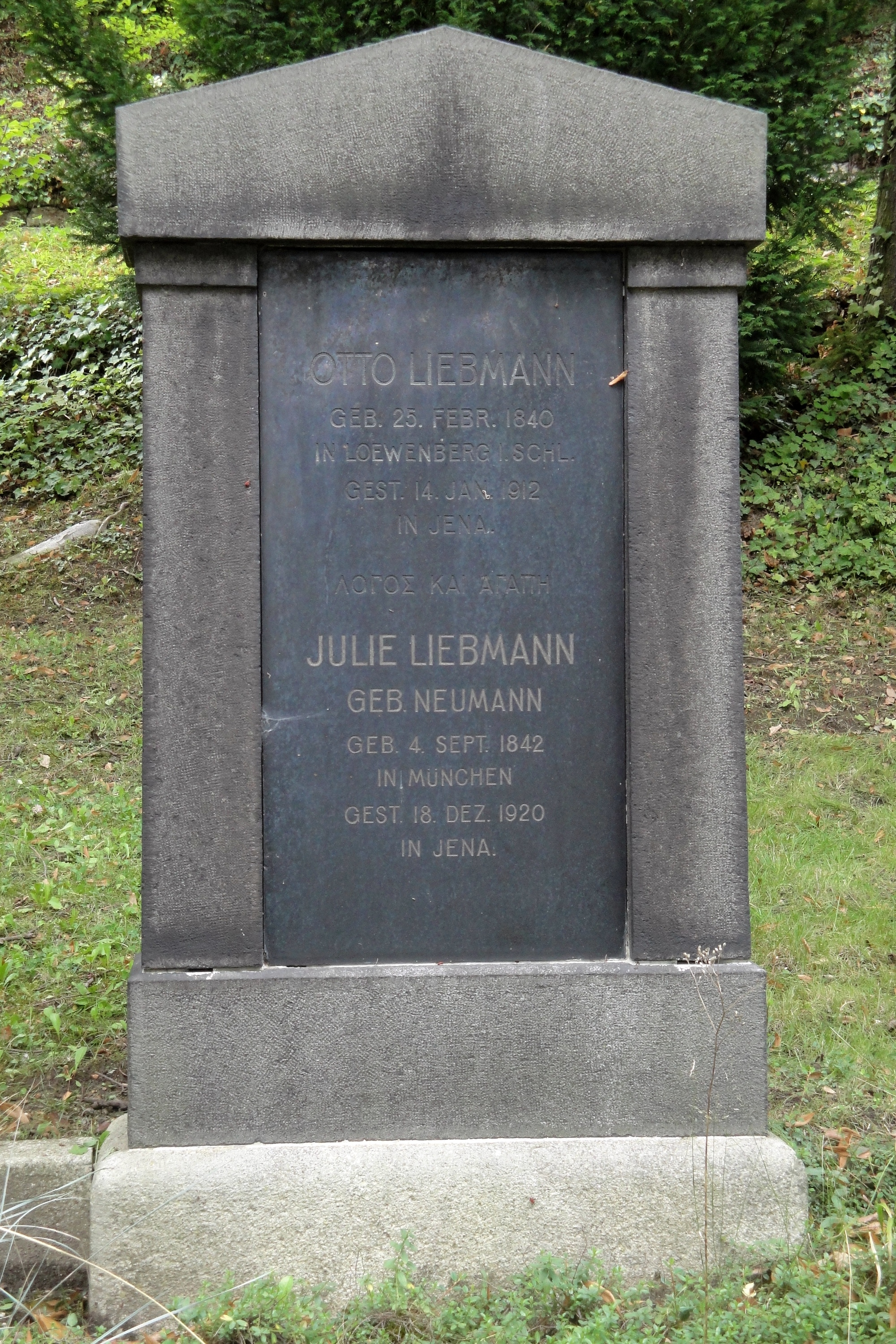
Grave at the Nordfriedhof in Jena

== Works ==
- Kant und die Epigonen, a critique of the followers of Kant urging a return to their master (1865) (Kant and his inferior successors)
- Ueber die Freiheit des Willens (1866) (On free will)
- Ueber den objektiven Anblick (1869) (On the objective point of view)
- Vier Monate vor Paris, a journal published anonymously (1871) (Four Months in Paris)
- Zur Analysis der Wirklichkeit (1876; 3rd ed. 1900) (About the analysis of actuality)
- Die Klimax der Theorien (1884) (The climax of theory)
- Geist der Transcendentalphilosophie (1901) (The Spirit of Transcendental Philosophy)
- Grundriss der kritischen Metaphysik (1901) (Outline of critical metaphysics)
- Gedanken und Tatsachen, 2 Bände (1882–1904) (Thoughts and facts)

== Sources ==
- Gilman, D. C.; Peck, H. T.; Colby, F. M., eds. (1905). "Liebmann, Otto" . New International Encyclopedia (1st ed.). New York: Dodd, Mead.
