= Hermann Strathmann =

German theologian

- Born: 30 August 1882; Opherdicke, Germany
- Died: 19 November 1966 (aged 84); Erlangen, Bavaria (Franconia), West Germany
- Occupations: Theologian; Politician
- Political party: BMP (1919-1920); DVNP (1920-1931); CSVD (1930-1933); NSDAP (1940-1945); CSU (1945-1954)
- Parent: Georg Hermann Engelbert Strathmann

Hermann Strathmann (30 August 1882 – 19 November 1966) was a German theologian and politician.

== Life ==
=== Empire years and war: 1882–1919 ===
Hermann Strathmann was born in Opherdicke, then a small town a short distance to the east of Dortmund. His father was a Lutheran pastor. He attended school locally till he was nearly 12, after which he received a Gymnasium (academic school) level education through private tutoring. Between 1895 and 1901 he attended the Royal Prussian district school at Schulpforte (today subsumed into Naumburg). He next studied Theology successively at Tübingen, Halle and Bonn. He passed his Theology exams in 1905 and 1907 at Münster. After two years at the Bodelschwingschen Institute at Bielefeld he received his doctorate from Bonn University in 1908 for a piece of work on Calvin's later doctrine of repentance.("Calvins Lehre von der Buße in ihrer späteren Gestalt"). His habilitation, also from Bonn, followed just two years later, and by 1910 Hermann Strathmann appeared well set for a career in the church or as a theological scholar.

Armed with a Theology Teaching License ( licentiatus theologicus) he began working as a private tutor at Bonn in 1910, also being employed as an inspector at the royal evangelical theological foundation there. In 1915 he took a position as a visiting professor in Heidelberg, and in 1916 he became a full professor at Rostock, a position he retain for two years before moving on again. In 1918 he switched to Erlangen where he took over the teaching chair for New Testament studies. He retained his teaching post at Erlangen for the next thirty years till his retirement in 1948. Another focus for his academic researches was the early years of Christianity.

Between 1915 and 1918 he took part in the First World War as a field chaplain on the Russian and western fronts.

=== Weimar years: 1919–1933 ===
After the war Strathmann turned to politics. In December 1918 he was a co-founder of the Bavarian Middle Party (Bayerische Mittelpartei) which after the revolution became part of the German National People's Party (Deutschnationale Volkspartei / DNVP) in March 1920. Politically he was one of many hankering after a return to the pre-war certainties. He was particularly drawn by the ideas of a Protestant version of the old "Holy Roman Empire" advocated by Adolf Stoecker (1835-1909) who at this time was something of a role model for Strathmann.

In 1919 Strathmann was elected to the first Bavarian regional legislature (Landtag), representing the electoral district that covered Erlangen, Fürth and Nuremberg. He remained a member till his election in June 1920 to the national legislature (Reichstag) where he was a member (albeit with brief breaks) till 1933. For the general elections of 1920, 1924 (both), and 1928 he was elected as a DNVP member.

He resigned temporarily from the Reichstag in September 1930, following growing differences with the DNVP leadership. In July 1930 Strathmann had already, along with several other disillusioned DNVP members, given his political allegiance to the emerging Christian Social People's Service (Christlich-Sozialer Volksdienst / CSVD), which was more than a splinter group but not - certainly not yet - a fully formed political party in its own right. At the heart of Strathmann's discontent with the DNVP was dissatisfaction with the party leader, Alfred Hugenberg whose reaction to the political challenges of the time involved moving the DNVP sharply towards a blend of radical right-wing nationalism and ultra-conservatism. It is clear that he had also in 1930 considered a formal resignation from the DNVP, but he reconciled himself to staying within it despite the "[intolerable] atmosphere of mistrust" ("[unerträglichen] Atmosphäre des Misstrauens"), fearing that a fragmenting of the politically right-wing DNVP could only improve the electoral chances of more extreme right-wing parties. After a four-month absence he returned to the Reichstag on 30 January 1931, taking the seat vacated through the resignation on 16 January of Hermann Kling. He now remained a Reichstag member till the election of July 1932. In the increasingly frenzied political context of 1932 another general election was held in November, and after another absence of several month Strathmann was now elected as one of the five successful CSVD candidates. His Reichstag career ended with the March 1933 "election".

=== Nazi years: 1933–1945 ===
Régime change arrived in 1933 and the new government lost little time in imposing one-party dictatorship. Membership of political parties (other than the Nazi Party) became illegal and the CSVD dissolved itself in March 1933. Strathmann himself had in 1931 already, in a widely distributed political paper entitled "National Socialist Philosophy?" ("Nationalsozialistische Weltanschauung"), gone public with his opinion that the racial views of National Socialism were incompatible with Christian belief because it seemed to promoted (some) human beings to the status of gods (Kreaturvergötterung), an opinion which in his paper he supported with quotations from Adolf Hitler's infamous autobiographical publication, Mein Kampf. Despite his theological concerns he was in some respects supportive of the new government. According to some, Strathmann expressed sympathy for the Confessing Church, but without ever joining it.

During the twelve Nazi years Strathmann pursued his academic teaching career at Erlangen despite a period of politically triggered disruption in 1933/34 after the local Gauletier, Julius Streicher, attempted to have him dismissed on account of his perceived "political unreliability". Strathmann redoubled his journalistic activities. He became responsible in July 1935 for the publication "Theologische Blätter", in which he provided substantial content under the editorial heading "Science and Life" ("Aus Wissenschaft und Leben") He also provided editorial input to the "Fränkischer Kurier", which brought him into conflict with the newspaper's managing editor, Julius Streicher as a result of which Strathmann resigned from the Kurier in 1939. Eventually, in 1940, Hermann Strathmann joined the Nazi Party.

After the war Strathmann became embroiled in a controversy with an academic colleague from their time together at Erlangen, Hermann Sasse, over the extent to which they had sat back and accepted Nazism. In 1945 Strathmann described himself as "one of the very few men who did not howl with the wolves and ... the only man in the whole university who, as long as it was possible, actively opposed the Nazis by the spoken and printed word."

=== Allied occupation years: 1945-1949 ===
War ended in May 1945 and Nazi dictatorship was replaced, in Bavaria, by US military occupation. Strathmann was initially able to continue with his university career at Erlangen. However, on 31 January 1947 the US military government removed him from his professorship. At least one source insists that this was nothing to do with his Nazi Party membership during the war years, nor with any other Nazi organisation. That left open the possibility that the Americans had responded to some malicious denunciation. Strathmann became convinced that they had been prompted by untrue reports from his colleague Hermann Sasse. In any event, he was formally "rehabilitated" within less than twelve months, but retired from his university career in 1948 which was the year of his 66th birthday.

In 1945 Strathmann returned to his political career which he pursued for some time after he had concluded his work at the university. In 1945 he joined the new Bavarian Christian Social Union (Christlich-Soziale Union in Bayern / CSU) party, and he sat as a party member in the Bavarian regional parliament (Landtag) between 1946 and 1950. Within the somewhat fragmented CSU grouping in the Landtag, and despite being a Protestant theologian, Strathmann was a member of the CSU faction surrounding Josef Müller. Not withstanding some denominational dilution caused by the arrival of refugees driven out by ethnic cleansing in parts of Poland and Russia east of the Oder-Neisse line which had been part of Germany before 1945, Hermann Strathmann remained member of a Protestant minority within an overwhelmingly Roman Catholic Bavarian state. Nevertheless, for historical reasons that dated back to the Thirty Years' War, the sub-region of Franconia in which Strathmann had made his home since 1918 was predominantly Protestant, and in the Bavarian CSU's party leadership committee Strathmann represented the Evangelical Christians.

=== German Federal Republic: 1949-1966 ===
In 1950, following the recommendation of an "Election Verification Committee" ("Wahlprüfungsausschuss"), the Bavarian Landtag declared that the election to the assembly of two members, Hermann Strathmann and August Haußleiter (1905-1989) had been invalid. Both men were Protestants: indeed both were the sons of Protestant ministers. Neither of them had been ineligible as candidates under the 1946 Law to Liberate from Nazism and Militarism" ("Gesetz zur Befreiung von Nationalsozialismus und Militarismus"). Nevertheless, in some of the pre-1945 writings of Strathmann and Haußleiter there were those who believed they had been able to identify signs of militaristic and Nazi ideology. The party's decision to withdraw his Landtag mandate resonated strongly across Bavaria and more widely across Germany because Strathmann was the leading representative of Protestantism within the overwhelmingly Catholic CSU, and the party's treatment of him came to symbolise the disadvantaged status of Protestantism within the Bavarian political establishment. In Franconia a party vote expressing no confidence in Strathmann was interpreted as a vote expressing no confidence in Protestant central Franconia, and against the (Protestant) regional CSU. Strathmann defended his position robustly, launching a case against the party leadership with the Bavarian Constitutional Court. The Erlangen regional party also protested forcibly. After a long drawn-out dispute Hermann Strathmann resigned from the CSU in 1954. The incident was reported as powerful evidence that Catholic tribal sectarianism was alive and kicking at the heart of the Bavarian political establishment. Strathmann went on to try, without success, to create a new Evangelical political party.
