= Friedrich Gogarten =

German theologian

- Born: 13 January 1887; Dortmund, Germany
- Died: 16 October 1967 (aged 80); Göttingen, West Germany

Academic background
- Influences: Karl Barth; Adolf von Harnack; Søren Kierkegaard; Martin Luther; Ernst Troeltsch

Academic work
- Discipline: Theology
- Sub-discipline: Systematic theology
- School or tradition: Dialectical theology; Lutheranism
- Institutions: University of Jena; University of Göttingen

Friedrich Gogarten (13 January 1887 – 16 October 1967) was a Lutheran theologian, co-founder of dialectical theology in Germany in the early 20th century.

== Career ==
Under the leadership of Karl Barth, Gogarten split from the prevailing liberal theology as represented by Albrecht Ritschl and others. He stood against the historicism and anthropocentrism of the Protestant theology of the 19th century by emphasizing the absolute antithesis of God and man. This new dialectical theology was named after a phrase in Gogarten's magazine Between the Ages.

Barth was excited by Gogarten, and in 1920 wrote to Eduard Thurneysen, "This is a dreadnought for us and against our adversaries. Who knows, someday he will teach us, he has quite the allure and the stuff one man which ... to be". Nonetheless a few years later a distance between Barth and Gogarten developed. Later Between the Ages ceased publication and Gogarten broke away from Barth. He also had differences with Rudolf Bultmann, who however resumed the relationship in 1940.

After the Sports Palace demonstration on 13 November 1933, in Berlin he wrote articles in several magazines explaining the "Faith Movement of German Christians". While Gogarten actively supported the German Christian movement for three months in 1933, which aligned itself with Hitler and the Nazi Party, he never joined the Nazi Party. In 1936 he signed a statement denouncing the German Christian position.

In 1927, Gogarten began teaching in Jena. His inaugural lecture was "Theological Tradition and Theological Work: Intellectual History or Theology?" This led to his appointment in 1931 as the successor of Erich Schaeder to the chair of systematic theology in Wrocław, Poland. In the summer of 1935 he took over the reading circle of Karl Barth in Bonn. In the winter of the same year he moved to Göttingen where he succeeded Carl Stange as Professor of Systematic Theology and was appointed as university preacher. On 25 February 1955, he retired in Göttingen, where he died.

Gogarten's general theme is "Man between God and the world", "The Church in the world" and the secularization as a result of the Christian revelation.

== Honors ==
- Honorary doctorate from the Theological Faculty of the University of Giessen (1924)
- Großes Verdienstkreuz der Bundesrepublik Deutschland (Great Cross of Merit of the Federal Republic of Germany) (1957)
- Großes Verdienstkreuz mit Stern der Bundesrepublik Deutschland (Great Cross of Merit with Star of the Federal Republic of Germany) (1967)
