= Liberal Christianity =

Emphasis on reason and experience over doctrinal authority

Liberal Christianity, also known as liberal theology and historically as Christian modernism (see Catholic modernism and fundamentalist–modernist controversy), is a movement that interprets Christian teaching by prioritizing modern knowledge, science and ethics. It emphasizes the importance of reason and experience over doctrinal authority. Liberal Christians view their theology as an alternative to both atheistic rationalism and theologies based on traditional interpretations of external authority, such as the Bible or sacred tradition.

Liberal theology grew out of the Enlightenment's rationalism and the Romanticism of the 18th and 19th centuries. By the late 19th and early 20th centuries, it was characterized by an acceptance of Darwinian evolution, use of modern biblical criticism, and participation in the Social Gospel movement. This was also the period when liberal theology was most dominant within the Protestant churches. Liberal theology's influence declined with the rise of neo-orthodoxy in the 1930s and with liberation theology in the 1960s. Catholic forms of liberal theology emerged in the late 19th century. By the 21st century, liberal Christianity had become an ecumenical tradition, including both Protestants and Catholics.

In the context of theology, liberal does not refer to political liberalism, and it should also be distinguished from progressive Christianity.

== Liberal Protestantism ==
Liberal Protestantism developed in the 19th century out of a perceived need to adapt Christianity to a modern intellectual context. With the acceptance of Charles Darwin's theory of natural selection, some traditional Christian beliefs, such as parts of the Genesis creation narrative, became difficult to defend. Unable to ground faith exclusively in an appeal to scripture or the person of Jesus Christ, liberals, according to theologian and intellectual historian Alister McGrath, "sought to anchor that faith in common human experience, and interpret it in ways that made sense within the modern worldview." Beginning in Germany, liberal theology was influenced by several strands of thought, including the Enlightenment's high view of human reason and Pietism's emphasis on religious experience and interdenominational tolerance.

The sources of religious authority recognized by liberal Protestants differed from conservative Protestants. Traditional Protestants understood the Bible to be uniquely authoritative (sola scriptura); all doctrine, teaching and the church itself derive authority from it. A traditional Protestant could therefore affirm that "what Scripture says, God says." Liberal Christians rejected the doctrine of biblical inerrancy or infallibility, which they saw as the idolatry (fetishism) of the Bible. Instead, liberals sought to understand the Bible through modern biblical criticism, such as historical criticism, that began to be used in the late 1700s to ask if biblical accounts were based on older texts or whether the Gospels recorded the actual words of Jesus. The use of these methods of biblical interpretation led liberals to conclude that "none of the New Testament writings can be said to be apostolic in the sense in which it has been traditionally held to be so". This conclusion made sola scriptura an untenable position. In its place, liberals identified the historical Jesus as the "real canon of the Christian church".

German theologian William Wrede wrote that "Like every other real science, New Testament Theology has its goal simply in itself, and is totally indifferent to all dogma and Systematic Theology". Theologian Hermann Gunkel affirmed that "the spirit of historical investigation has now taken the place of a traditional doctrine of inspiration". Episcopal bishop John Shelby Spong declared that the literal interpretation of the Bible is heresy.

The two groups also disagreed on the role of experience in confirming truth claims. Traditional Protestants believed scripture and revelation always confirmed human experience and reason. For liberal Protestants, there were two ultimate sources of religious authority: the Christian experience of God as revealed in Jesus Christ and universal human experience. In other words, only an appeal to common human reason and experience could confirm the truth claims of Christianity.

In general, liberal Christians are not concerned with the presence of biblical errors or contradictions. Liberals abandoned or reinterpreted traditional doctrines in light of recent knowledge. For example, the traditional doctrine of original sin was rejected for being derived from Augustine of Hippo, whose views on the New Testament were believed to have been distorted by his involvement with Manichaeism. Christology was also reinterpreted. Liberals stressed Christ's humanity, and his divinity became "an affirmation of Jesus exemplifying qualities which humanity as a whole could hope to emulate".

Liberal Christians sought to elevate Jesus' humane teachings as a standard for a world civilization freed from cultic traditions and traces of traditionally pagan types of belief in the supernatural. As a result, liberal Christians placed less emphasis on miraculous events associated with the life of Jesus than on his teachings. The debate over whether a belief in miracles was mere superstition or essential to accepting the divinity of Christ constituted a crisis within the 19th-century church, for which theological compromises were sought. Some liberals prefer to read Jesus' miracles as metaphorical narratives for understanding the power of God. Not all theologians with liberal inclinations reject the possibility of miracles, but many reject the polemicism that denial or affirmation entails.

Nineteenth-century liberalism had an optimism about the future in which humanity would continue to achieve greater progress. This optimistic view of history was sometimes interpreted as building the kingdom of God in the world.

=== Development ===
The roots of liberal Christianity go back to the 16th century when Christians such as Erasmus and the Deists attempted to remove what they believed were the superstitious elements from Christianity and "leave only its essential teachings (rational love of God and humanity)".

Reformed theologian Friedrich Schleiermacher (1768–1834) is often considered the father of liberal Protestantism. In response to Romanticism's disillusionment with Enlightenment rationalism, Schleiermacher argued that God could only be experienced through feeling, not reason. In Schleiermacher's theology, religion is a feeling of absolute dependence on God. Humanity is conscious of its own sin and its need of redemption, which can only be accomplished by Jesus Christ. For Schleiermacher, faith is experienced within a faith community, never in isolation. This meant that theology always reflects a particular religious context, which has opened Schleirmacher to charges of relativism.

Albrecht Ritschl (1822–1889) disagreed with Schleiermacher's emphasis on feeling. He thought that religious belief should be based on history, specifically the historical events of the New Testament. When studied as history without regard to miraculous events, Ritschl believed the New Testament affirmed Jesus' divine mission. He rejected doctrines such as the virgin birth of Jesus and the Trinity. The Christian life for Ritschl was devoted to ethical activity and development, so he understood doctrines to be value judgments rather than assertions of facts. Influenced by the philosophy of Immanuel Kant, Ritschl viewed "religion as the triumph of the spirit (or moral agent) over humanity's natural origins and environment." Ritschl's ideas would be taken up by others, and Ritschlianism would remain an important theological school within German Protestantism until World War I. Prominent followers of Ritschl include Wilhelm Herrmann, Julius Kaftan and Adolf von Harnack.

== Liberal Catholicism ==
Catholic forms of theological liberalism have existed since the 19th century in England, France and Italy. In the late 19th and early 20th centuries, a liberal theological movement developed within the Catholic Church known as Catholic modernism. Like liberal Protestantism, Catholic modernism was an attempt to bring Catholicism in line with the Enlightenment. Modernist theologians approved of radical biblical criticism and were willing to question traditional Christian doctrines, especially Christology. They also emphasized the ethical aspects of Christianity over its theological ones. Important modernist writers include Alfred Loisy and George Tyrrell. Modernism was condemned as heretical by the leadership of the Catholic Church.

Sean O'Riordan refers to a liberal attitude as one of four schools of thought adopted among the bishops and other theologians at the Second Vatican Council: the liberal attitude, reflective of the mid-century Nouvelle théologie movement, was "modern-minded, enterprising, [and] ready for new ventures of faith", opting for "newness" in many aspects of the pastoral life of the Church "from top to bottom".

Papal condemnation of modernism and Americanism slowed the development of a liberal Catholic tradition in the United States. Since the Second Vatican Council, however, liberal theology has experienced a resurgence. Liberal Catholic theologians include David Tracy and Francis Schussler Fiorenza.

== Liberal Quakerism ==
In the 1820s, Quakerism, also known as the Religious Society of Friends, experienced a major schism called the Hicksite–Orthodox split. The Hicksites were led by Quaker minister Elias Hicks, who put a strong focus on listening to one's inward light instead of a primary appeal to doctrine or creeds. Hicks went as far as to say that strictly holding to the Bible was damaging to believers and to Christianity as a whole. In addition to other distinctives, Hicks denied Satan as an external being and did not talk about an eternal Hell.

Hicksite-Quakerism, often called the Liberal branch, is today found most prominently in the Friends General Conference, but it also found in the centrist Friends United Meeting. Rather than holding to any firm statement of faith, Hicksite Quakers are led by the Inward Light as they believe it leads them. While Evangelist Quakers (see Gurneyite–Conservative split) were seen as holding to human reason, Liberal Quakers took a more spiritual and open approach. Liberal Quakers variably hold to Christian universalism, religious pluralism, progressive Christianity and other ideas not commonly held in conservative Christian circles.

== Influence in the United States ==
Liberal Christianity was most influential with Mainline Protestant churches in the early 20th century, when proponents believed the changes it would bring would be the future of the Christian church. Its greatest and most influential manifestation was the Christian Social Gospel, whose most influential spokesman was the American Baptist Walter Rauschenbusch. Rauschenbusch identified four institutionalized spiritual evils in American culture (which he identified as traits of "supra-personal entities", organizations capable of having moral agency): these were individualism, capitalism, nationalism and militarism.

Other subsequent theological movements within the U.S. Protestant mainline included political liberation theology, philosophical forms of postmodern Christianity, and such diverse theological influences as Christian existentialism (originating with Søren Kierkegaard and including other theologians and scholars such as Rudolf Bultmann and Paul Tillich) and even conservative movements such as neo-evangelicalism, neo-orthodoxy, and paleo-orthodoxy. Dean M. Kelley, a liberal sociologist, was commissioned in the early 1970s to study the problem, and he identified a potential reason for the decline of the liberal churches: what was seen by some as excessive politicization of the Gospel, and especially their apparent tying of the Gospel with Left-Democrat/progressive political causes.

The 1990s and 2000s saw a resurgence of non-doctrinal, theological work on biblical exegesis and theology, exemplified by figures such as Marcus Borg, John Dominic Crossan, John Shelby Spong, Karen Armstrong and Scotty McLennan.

== Theologians and authors ==
=== Anglican and Protestant ===
- Friedrich Daniel Ernst Schleiermacher (1768–1834), often called the "father of liberal theology", he claimed that religious experience was introspective, and that the most true understanding of God consisted of "a sense of absolute dependence".
- Charles Augustus Briggs (1841–1913), professor at Union Theological Seminary, early advocate of higher criticism of the Bible.
- Henry Ward Beecher (1813–1887), American preacher who left behind the Calvinist orthodoxy of his famous father, the Reverend Lyman Beecher, to instead preach the Social Gospel of liberal Christianity.
- Adolf von Harnack, (1851–1930), German theologian and church historian, promoted the Social Gospel; wrote a seminal work of historical theology called Lehrbuch der Dogmengeschichte (History of Dogma).
- Charles Fillmore (1854–1948), Christian mystic influenced by Emerson; co-founder, with his wife, Myrtle Fillmore, of the Unity Church.
- Hastings Rashdall (1858–1924), English philosopher, theologian, and Anglican priest. Dean of Carlisle from 1917 until 1924. Author of Doctrine and Development (1898).
- Walter Rauschenbusch (1861–1918) American Baptist, author of "A Theology for the Social Gospel", which gave the movement its definitive theological definition.
- Harry Emerson Fosdick (1878–1969), a Northern Baptist, founding pastor of New York's Riverside Church in 1922.
- Rudolf Bultmann (1884–1976), German biblical scholar, liberal Christian theologian until 1924. Bultmann was more of an existentialist than a "liberal", as his defense of Jesus' healings in his "History of Synoptic Tradition" makes clear.
- Paul Tillich (1886–1965), seminal figure in liberal Christianity; synthesized liberal Protestant theology with existentialist philosophy, but later came to be counted among the "neo-orthodox".
- Leslie Weatherhead (1893–1976), English preacher and author of The Will of God and The Christian Agnostic
- James Pike (1913–1969), Episcopal Bishop, Diocese of California 1958–1966. Early television preacher as Dean of the Cathedral of St. John the Divine in New York City; social gospel advocate and civil rights supporter; author of If This Be Heresy and The Other Side; in later life studied Christian origins and spiritualism.
- Lloyd Geering (b. 1918), New Zealand liberal theologian.
- Paul Moore, Jr. (1919–2003), 13th Episcopal Bishop, New York Diocese
- John A.T. Robinson (1919–1983), Anglican Bishop of Woolwich, author of Honest to God; later dedicated himself to demonstrating very early authorship of the New Testament writings, publishing his findings in Redating the New Testament.
- John Hick (1922–2012), British philosopher of religion and liberal theologian, noted for his rejection of the Incarnation and advocacy of latitudinarianism and religious pluralism or non-exclusivism, as explained in his influential work, The Myth of God Incarnate.
- William Sloane Coffin (1924–2006), Senior Minister at the Riverside Church in New York City, and President of SANE/Freeze (now Peace Action).
- Christopher Morse (b. 1935), professor emeritus of Systematic Theology, Union Theological Seminary, noted for his theology of faithful disbelief.
- John Shelby Spong (1931–2021), Episcopal bishop and very prolific author of books such as A New Christianity for a New World, in which he wrote of his rejection of historical religious and Christian beliefs such as Theism (a traditional conception of God as an existent being), the afterlife, miracles, and the Resurrection.
- Richard Holloway (b. 1933), Scottish Episcopal bishop of Edinburgh from 1986 to 2000 and primus from 1992 to 2000; proponent of LGBTQ rights and progressive theology within the church.
- Rubem Alves (1938–2014), Brazilian, ex-Presbyterian, former minister, retired professor from UNICAMP, seminal figure in the liberation theology movement.
- Matthew Fox (b. 1940), former Roman Catholic priest of the Order of Preachers; currently an American Episcopal priest and theologian, noted for his synthesis of liberal Christian theology with New Age concepts in his ideas of "creation spirituality", "original blessing", and seminal work on the "Cosmic Christ"; founder of Creation Spirituality.
- Marcus Borg (1942–2015) American Biblical scholar, prolific author, fellow of the Jesus Seminar.
- Robin Meyers (b. 1952) United Church of Christ pastor and professor of Social Justice. Author of Saving Jesus from the Church.
- Michael Dowd (1958–2023) Religious Naturalist theologian, evidential evangelist, and promoter of Big History and the Epic of Evolution.

=== Roman Catholic ===
- Thomas Berry (1914–2009), American Passionist priest, cultural historian, geologian, and cosmologist.
- Hans Küng (1928–2021), Swiss theologian. Had his license to teach Catholic theology revoked in 1979 because of his vocal rejection of the doctrine of the infallibility of the Pope, but remained a priest in good standing.
- John Dominic Crossan (b. 1934), ex-Catholic and former priest, New Testament scholar, co-founder of the critical liberal Jesus Seminar.
- Elisabeth Schüssler Fiorenza (born 1938) German feminist theologian and Professor at Harvard Divinity School

=== Other ===
- William Ellery Channing (1780–1842), Unitarian liberal theologian in the United States, who rejected the Trinity and the strength of scriptural authority, in favor of purely rationalistic "natural religion".
- Elias Hicks (1748–1830), Quaker minister who started the Liberal branch of Quakerism as a result of the Hicksite–Orthodox schism in the 1820s.
- Scotty McLennan (b. 1948) Unitarian Universalist minister, Stanford University professor and author.

== See also ==
- Biblical hermeneutics
- Christian atheism – Form of Christianity rejecting God
- Conflict thesis (or warfare thesis)
- Death of God theology – Christian theological field of study
- Evangelical left – Christian left movement
- Existentialist theology – Existentialist approach to Christian theology
- Free Christians (Britain)
- Fountain Street Church – Church building in Michigan, United States of America
- Fundamentalist-Modernist controversy – Christian religious issue
- Historicity of the Bible – Relationship between historic and biblical events
- Jesus Seminar – American biblical research project
- Liberal Anglo-Catholicism – Theologically and socially liberal
- Liberation theology – Christian theological approach
- Moderate Christianity – Christian movement based on spiritual wisdom
- Moralistic therapeutic deism – American folk religion
- Postliberal theology – Christian theological movement
- Postmodern Christianity – Theological movement
- Religious liberalism – Religious philosophy emphasizing liberty
- Religious pluralism – Stance of supporting peaceful coexistence and diversity of spiritual belief
- Riverside Church – Interdenominational church in Manhattan, New York
- Secular theology – Theology embracing this-world realities and rejecting dualism
- Unitarian Universalism – Non-creedal liberal religious movement
- Liberalism and Christianity
