= Kuno Fischer =

German philosopher (1824–1907)

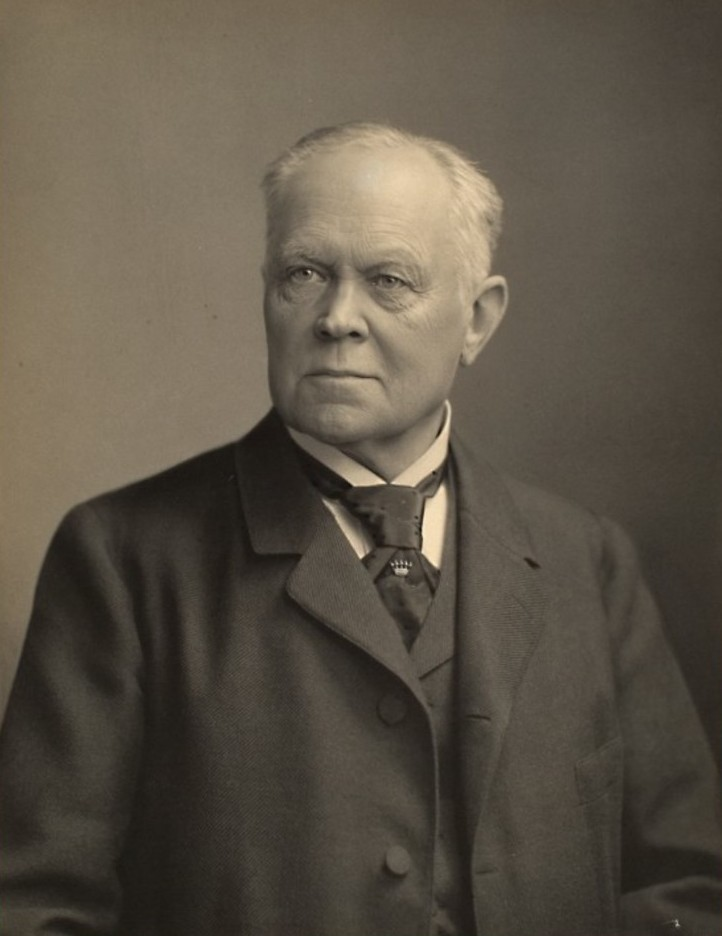
- 1894 portrait
- Born: Ernst Kuno Berthold Fischer; 23 July 1824; Sandewalde near Guhrau, Silesia, Prussia, German Confederation
- Died: 5 July 1907 (aged 82); Heidelberg, Baden, German Empire

Education
- Education: University of Leipzig; University of Halle (PhD, 1847)
- Thesis: De Parmenide Platonico (On Plato's Parmenides) (1847)
- Academic advisors: J. E. Erdmann; Julius Schaller

Philosophical work
- Era: 19th-century philosophy
- Region: Western philosophy
- School: Hegelianism (early); Neo-Kantianism (late)
- Institutions: Heidelberg University; University of Jena
- Doctoral students: Edmund Hardy
- Notable students: Wilhelm Dilthey; Richard Falckenberg; Gottlob Frege; Otto Liebmann; Johannes Volkelt; Wilhelm Windelband
- Main interests: Metaphysics, history of philosophy
- Notable ideas: The empiricism–rationalism distinction

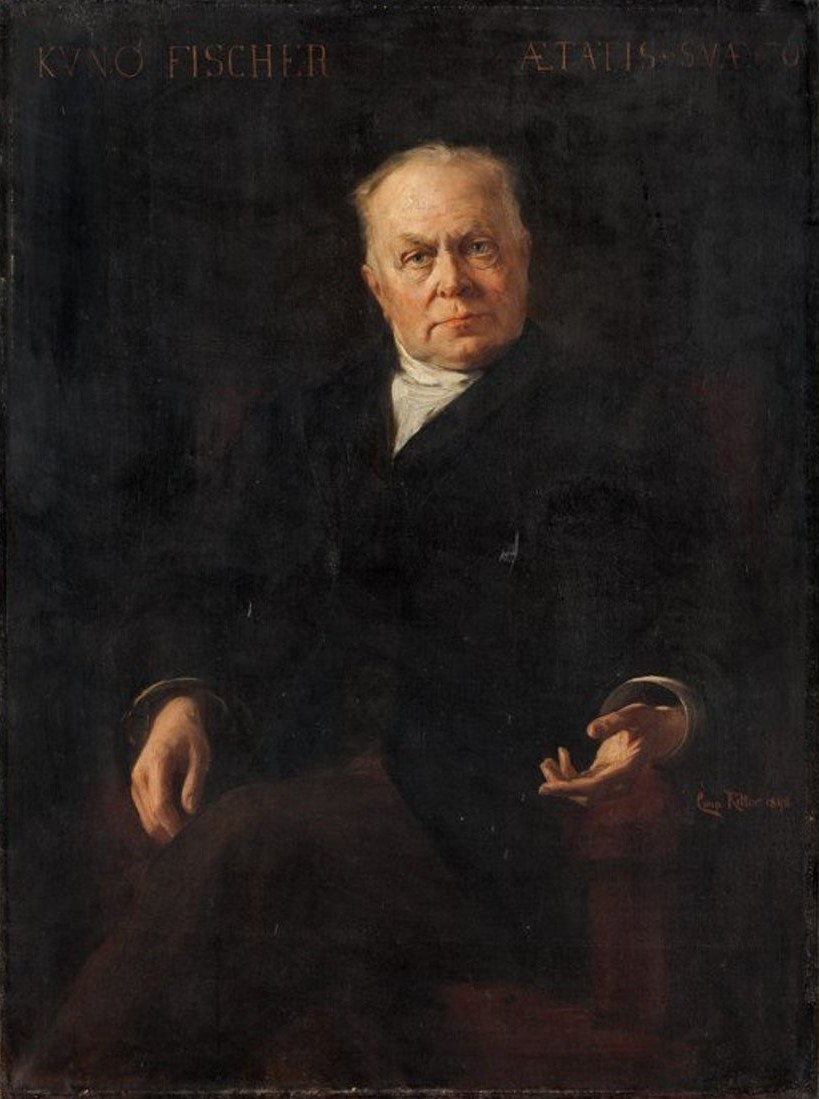
Portrait of Fischer by Caspar Ritter (1898)

Ernst Kuno Berthold Fischer (/ˈfɪʃər/; German: [ˈfɪʃɐ]; 23 July 1824 – 5 July 1907) was a German philosopher and historian of philosophy.

== Biography ==
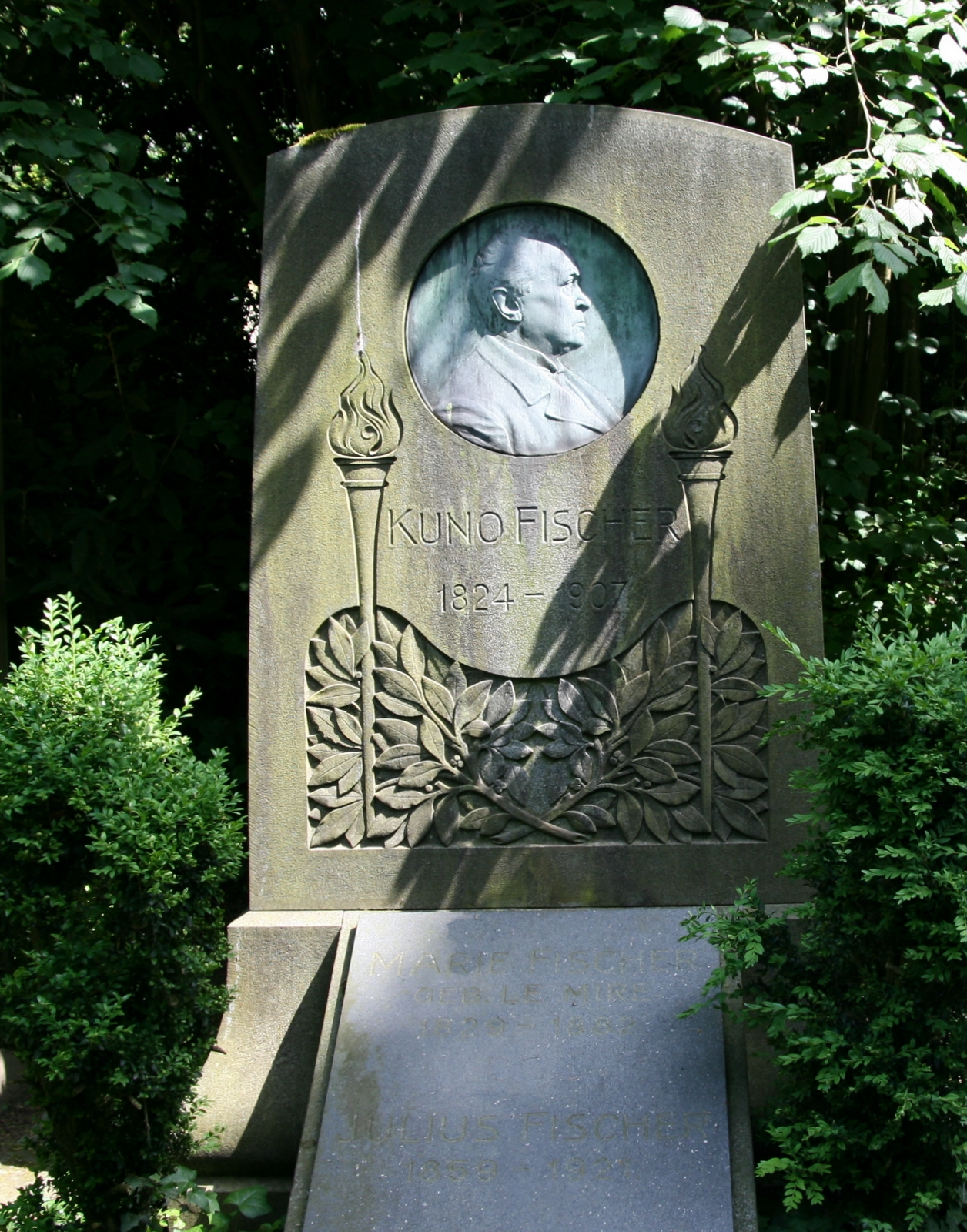
His grave in Heidelberg

After studying philosophy at Leipzig and Halle, he became a Privatdozent at Heidelberg in 1850. The Baden government in 1853 laid an embargo on his teaching owing to his liberal ideas, but the effect of this was to rouse considerable sympathy for his views, and in 1856 he obtained a professorship at Jena, where he soon acquired great influence by the dignity of his personal character. In 1872, on Eduard Zeller's move to Berlin, Fischer succeeded him as professor of philosophy and the history of modern German literature at Heidelberg.

He was a brilliant lecturer and possessed a remarkable gift for clear exposition. His fame rests primarily on his work as a historian and commentator of philosophy. As far as his philosophical views were concerned, he was, generally speaking, a follower of the Hegelian school. His writings in this direction, especially his interpretation of Kant, involved him in a quarrel with F. A. Trendelenburg, professor of philosophy at the University of Berlin, and his followers. In 1860, Fischer's Kants Leben und die Grundlagen seiner Lehre (Kant's life and the foundations of his doctrine) lent the first real impulse to the so-called "return to Kant".

In honor of his 80th birthday, celebrated in 1904, Otto Liebmann, Wilhelm Wundt, Theodor Lipps and others published Die Philosophie im Beginn des 20. Jahrhunderts. Festschrift für Kuno Fischer (Heidelberg, 1907).

== Philosophy ==
One of Fischer's most significant and lasting contributions to philosophy was the use of the empiricism/rationalism distinction in categorising philosophers, particularly those of the 17th and 18th centuries. These include John Locke, George Berkeley and David Hume in the empiricist category and René Descartes, Baruch Spinoza and G. W. Leibniz in the rationalist category. Empiricism, it is said, claims that human knowledge is derived from sensation, i.e. experience, while rationalism claims that certain knowledge can be acquired before experience through pure principles. Although influential, in more recent times this distinction has been questioned as anachronistic in its failure to represent precisely the exact claims and methodologies of the philosophers it categorises.

== Reception ==
Kuno Fischer's History of Modern Philosophy had a strong impact on Friedrich Nietzsche and his view on modern philosophy, particularly regarding Spinoza.

Gottlob Frege and W. Somerset Maugham were amongst Fischer's students.

Hermann Weyl, writing about pre-WWII academic life in Germany, told the following anecdote about Fischer:

A little anecdote of German university life in the nineties may illustrate the point. Kuno Fischer, a second-rate philosopher at Heidelberg, was one day disturbed by the noise of workers who were putting in new cobblestones in the street before his house. He had at that time been offered a professorship in Berlin. So he opened his window and shouted to the workmen, "If you don't stop that noise at once, I'll accept the call to Berlin". Whereupon the foreman ran to the mayor, he summoned the Stadtbaumeister and they decided to postpone repair of the street until after the beginning of the academic vacation.

== Works ==
- Moderne Sophisten (Leipziger Revue, 1847)
- De Parmenide Platonico. Stuttgart (thesis, 1847, online).
- Diotima. Die Idee des Schönen (Diotima, the idea of the beautiful; Pforzheim, 1849) (online)
- System der Logik und Metaphysik oder Wissenschaftslehre (System of logic and metaphysics, or doctrine of knowledge; 1852) (online)
- Das Interdict meiner Vorlesungen (The prohibition of my lectures; Mannheim, 1854)
- 1854: Die Apologie meiner Lehre nebst Replik auf die „Abfertigung“ des Herrn Schenkel (online)
- Geschichte der neuern Philosophie (History of modern philosophy; 6 vols., Stuttgart-Mannheim-Heidelberg, 1854–77; new edition, Heidelberg, 1897–1901) This is considered by some to be his greatest work. It is written in the form of monographs on Descartes, Kant, Fichte, Schelling and other great philosophers down to Schopenhauer:
  - erster Band: Descartes und seine Schule (1. Teil online, 2. Teil online)
  - zweiter Band: Leibniz und seine Schule (online)
  - dritter Band: Immanuel Kant und seine Lehre (online)
  - vierter Band: Kant's System der reinen Vernunft
    (online: 2. Aufl. 1869, 3. neu bearb. Aufl. 1882, 4. ed. 1899)
  - fünfter Band: Fichte und seine Vorgänger (online)
  - achter Band: Hegels Leben, Werke und Lehre (online: part 1 (1901), part 2 (1901))
  - neunter Band: Schopenhauers Leben, Werke und Lehre (online (Jubiläumsausgabe 1898))
- Franz Baco von Verona (Leipzig, 1856 (2nd edition 1875); translated into English by J. Oxenford, London, 1857)
- Schiller als Philosoph (Frankfurt am Main, 1858; 2nd ed. 1891-92)
- Kants Leben und die Grundlagen seiner Lehre (Mannheim, 1860)
- Akademische Reden: J. G. Fichte; Die beiden Kantischen Schulen in Jena (The two schools of Kant in Jena; Stuttgart, 1862)
- Lessings “Nathan der Weise” (Stuttgart, 1864; translated into English by Ellen Frothingham, New York, 1868)
- Baruch Spinozas Leben und Charakter (Heidelberg, 1865; translated into English by F. Schmidt, Edinburgh, 1882)
- System der reinen Vernunft auf Grund der Vernunftkritik (1866)
- Shakespeares Charakterentwickelung Richards III (Character development of Shakespeare's Richard III; Heidelberg, 1868)
- Über die Entstehung und die Entwickelungsformen des Witzes (The origins and modes of development of wit; Heidelberg, 1871)
- Schellings Leben, Werke und Lehre (Heidelberg, [1872] - taken from the Fourth Edition, issued in monographic series, Geschichte der Neuern Philosophie von Kudo Fischer, published in Heidelberg, 1923 - on the work of German philosopher Friedrich Wilhelm Joseph Schelling)
- Kritik der Kantischen Philosophie (Munich, 1883; translated into English by W. S. Hough, London 1888)
- Goethe-Schriften (8 vols., Heidelberg, 1888–96)
- Kleine Schriften (Heidelberg, 1888–98)
- Schiller-Schriften (2 vols., Heidelberg, 1891)
- Philosophische Schriften (3 parts, Heidelberg, 1891–92)
- Hegels Leben und Werke (Heidelberg, 1911)

Other translations of his works include:

- A Commentary of Kant's "Critic of Pure Reason" (trans. by J. P. Mahaffy, London-Dublin, 1866; online)
- Descartes and his School (trans. by John P. Gordy, New York, 1887)

== See also ==
- Fischer–Trendelenburg debate
