= Hermann Kling =

German politician

Hermann Kling (17 February 1880 – 20 January 1957) was a German politician (CSVD, CDU).

== Life ==
Hermann Jakob Kling was born in Owen, a small protestant town set in the hill countryside of Württemberg, between Stuttgart and Ulm. He was the second of the five recorded children born to Jakob Friedrich Kling (1847–1918) by his marriage to Karoline Luise Obenland / Kling (1853–1936). He attended school locally and then moved on to the Teacher Training college at nearby Nürtingen. After successfully passing through the basic training programme he joined the Württemberg public schools service. Between 1902 and 1903 he taught at Mitteltal near Baiersbronn and Kirchheim. Between 1910 and 1913 Kling undertook university level studies at Tübingen. Subjects covered included Philosophy, Pedagogy, Psychology and History along with Civil and Administrative Law. In 1916 he was appointed to the headship of a junior school, although he was only able to take it up in November 1918, after returning from the war.

Between August 1914 and November 1918 he served in the 122nd Fusilier Regiment (Württemberg), reaching the rank of Lieutenant and compiling, after the war, a history of the regiment during the war. He won the Iron Cross first and second class, the Knight's Cross of Württemberg and the Knight's Cross Class 2 with Swords of the Friedrich Order.

After the revolution Kling turned to politics, joining the short-lived Christian Social People's Service (party - "Christlich-Sozialer Volksdienst" / CSVD), a protestant conservative party produced through a political merger. In May 1928 he became a member of the regional legislature ("Landtag"), remaining a member till 1933 when the assembly was dissolved. On the national stage, he was one of 14 CSVD candidates elected to the national parliament ("Reichstag") in the 1930 general election. However, he remained a member only till 16 January 1931, after which he restricted himself to the regional legislature ("Landtag"). His Reichstag seat was taken over by Hermann Strathmann. Régime change arrived in 1933 and the new government lost little time in imposing one-party dictatorship. The CSVD dissolved itself in June 1933 after which Kling served out the final months of the regional legislature ("Landtag") as a "Hospitant" (loosely: guest member) of the Nazi party. However, the matter was for most purposes theoretical, since the Landtag's final session took place on 8 June 1933 and the Landtag was formally abolished in January 1934.

In 1937 Kling acquired "Gut Sonnenhof", a small farm in Beuren. He lived there and farmed the land till 1950. After the war ended in 1945 he returned to politics, although he continued to run the farm at the same time. In January 1946 he was a member of the regional "pre-parliament" created under the auspices of the US military occupation. By this time Hermann Kling was a member of the CDU, a centre-right political party which had emerged the previous year, although its roots went back to the Weimar years. The "pre-parliament" was a nominated chamber, but elections were held in June 1946 for a constitutional assembly, mandated to create a regional constitution for the newly configured state of Württemberg-Baden. There was a further regional election in November 1946, held simultaneously with a referendum to approve the new constitution, and Kling was elected to the regional parliament (Landtag) of Württemberg-Baden, remaining a member of it till 1950.

== Personal ==
In 1909 Hermann Kling married Hulda Honegger (1881–1966). Their sons Hermann and Gerhard Paul were born in 1911 and 1918.
