= Hermann Mandel =

German theologian

- Born: 13 December 1882; Holzwickede, Germany
- Died: 8 April 1946 (aged 63); Kluvensiek, Rendsburg, Germany

Academic background
- Education: University of Greifswald
- Doctoral advisor: Carl Stange

Academic work
- Discipline: Theology
- Institutions: University of Greifswald; University of Rostock; University of Kiel
- Main interests: Indo-European religion; "Nordic-Aryan" religion

Hermann Mandel (13 December 1882 – 8 April 1946), born Johann Hermann Mandel, was a German theologian who served as Professor of Theology at the University of Kiel.

== Biography ==
Hermann Mandel was born in Holzwickede, Germany on 13 December 1882. His father, Heinrich Mandel, was a teacher and later the head of an orphanage. Mandel gained his abitur from Gymnasium Adolfinum Moers in 1901, and subsequently studied theology at the universities of Halle, Königsberg, Bonn and Greifswald. At Greifswald his teacher was Carl Stange. Mandel received his Ph.D. and completed his habilitation at Greifswald, and in 1911 he was appointed a professor there.

From 1912 to 1918, Mandel was Professor of Systematic Theology at the University of Rostock. From 1918 to 1935 he was Professor of Theology at the University of Kiel, having succeeded Erich Schaeder. During this years, Mandel increasingly drifted away from traditional Protestant teaching, and became interested in the relationship between religion and race and ethnicity. He saw the intellectual world as being divided into Western and Near Eastern components, and argued in favor of purging Christianity of all Jewish influences. He joined Jakob Wilhelm Hauer's German Faith Movement and became a co-editor of its journal Deutscher Glaube. He also became a member of the National Socialist Teachers League, the Nazi Party, the National Socialist German Lecturers League, and during World War II he participated in Aktion Ritterbusch. Mandel authored a number of works on the supposed religions of the "Nordic" and "Aryan" races, Christianity, and Indo-European religion. Many of these works were banned and destroyed in the Soviet occupation zone after the war.

Mandel died in Kluvensiek, Rendsburg, Germany on 8 April 1946. He is buried at the Parkfriedhof Eichhof in Kiel.

== See also ==
- Otto Huth
- Gustav Mensching

== Selected works ==
- Die Erkenntnis des Übersinnlichen: Grundriß der systematischen Theologie. Leipzig: Deichert 1911–1912.
- Nordisch-Deutsches Seelentum im Gegensatz zum Morgenländischen. Stuttgart 1934.
- Nordisch-arische Wirklichkeitsreligion. 1934.
- Deutsche Glaubensunterweisung in Frage und Antwort. 1935.
- Deutscher Gottglaube. 1934.
- Rassenkundliche Geistesgeschichte. Eine einführende Antrittsvorlesung und ein systematischer Forschungsüberblick. Leipzig 1936 (Schriften zum deutschen Glauben. Heft 6).
- Das Wesen des Judentums nach Selbstzeugnis und Kulturleistung. Die Judenfrage im Licht der Rassenpsychologie und Kulturbiologie. In: Der Weltkampf, 1942, S. 189–199.

== Sources ==
- Matthias Wolfes (1999). "Hermann Mandel". In Bautz, Traugott (ed.). Biographisch-Bibliographisches Kirchenlexikon (BBKL) (in German). Vol. 15. Herzberg: Bautz. cols. 930–939. ISBN 3-88309-077-8.
- Antje Gerlach: Mandel, Hermann. In: Wolfgang Benz (Hrsg.): Handbuch des Antisemitismus. Judenfeindschaft in Geschichte und Gegenwart. Bd. 2/2: Personen L–Z. De Gruyter Saur, Berlin 2009, ISBN 978-3-598-24072-0, S. 512f.
