= Ventura Ruiz Aguilera =

Spanish poet (1820–1881)

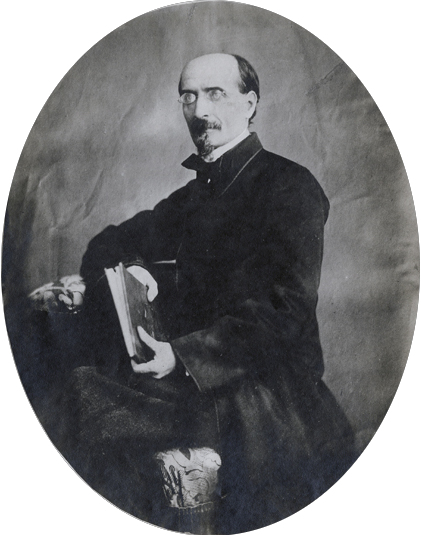
Ventura Ruiz Aguilera

Ventura Ruiz Aguilera (1820–1881) was a Spanish lyric poet, called "the Spanish Béranger.”

== Biography ==
He was born in 1820 at Salamanca, where he graduated in medicine. He moved to Madrid in 1844, where he engaged in political journalism and later occupied important official positions under the liberal ministries. Aguilera became director of the National Archaeological Museum at Madrid, where he died on 1 July 1881.

== Writing ==
Aguilera won considerable popularity with a collection of poems entitled Ecos Nacionales (1849). In this work, and in the journals he edited or controlled, he endeavored to arouse the masses to a sense of their national dignity. His Elegías y armonías (1863) was no less successful than the Ecos, but his Sátiras (1874) and Estaciones del año (1879) showed that his powers were declining. Several collections of his prose writings, which consisted mostly of short novels, have been published. Selections from his poems were published under the respective titles Inspiraciones (1865) and Poesías (1880).

He wrote under the obvious influence of Lamartine, preaching the gospel of liberalism and Christianity in verses which, though deficient in force, leave the impression of a sincere devotion and a charming personality.

== Works ==
- El grito de la conciencia
- Del agua mansa nos libre Dios, 1847
- Bernardo de Saldaña, 1848
- Un conspirador de a folio, 1848
- Camino de Portugal, 1849
- La limosna y el perdón, 1853
- El beso de Judas, 1860
- Obras poéticas. Elegías, 1862
- Proverbios ejemplares, 1864
- Armonías y cantares, 1865
- El mundo al revés, 1865, 2 v.
- Inspiraciones: poesías selectas, 1865
- La arcadia moderna, 1867
- Cuentos del día, 1868
- Balada de Cataluña, 1868
- El libro de la patria, 1869
- La leyenda de Noche-Buena, 1872
- Las estaciones del año, 1879
