= Künstler Bahntechnik =

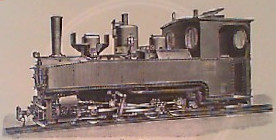
600 mm (1 ft 11 5/8 in) gauge 0-8-0T steam locomotive with 60 hp, ca 1923

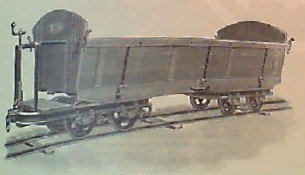
Narrow gauge light railway wagon for the transport of agricultural products with iron bogies, one of them with a spindle brake, ca 1923

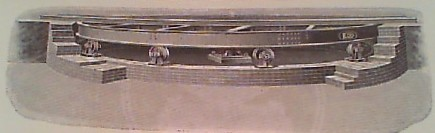
Standard gauge railway turntable with roller bearings, ca 1923

Künstler Bahntechnik GmbH is a German company for steel processing in the rail transport sector based in Hamm with a branch in Chemnitz.

== History ==
Künstler & Co was founded in Dortmund in 1907 and had, due to the high market demand, by 1925 also branches in Leipzig, Hamburg and Nuremberg. It originally specialised in light and industrial railways, points and wagons, and built narrow and standard gauge track systems according to state railway regulations.

The company supplied, among other products, steam locomotives whose design, gauge and power varied from 20 to 260 hp according to customer specifications. Among its most important products were box wagons for the transport of agricultural products with wooden or iron bogies, braked or unbraked, with spring-loaded bearings, draw hooks with three-link chain with fold-down side boards and a load volume of 2 to 6 m³.

The company moved from Holzwickede to Hamm in 2017/2018, where it trades as Künstler Bahntechnik GmbH. It offers steel and apparatus engineering, wagon construction, track technology and mechanical engineering (new production, overhauls and service) in cooperation with the Holz-Fehlings Group. It . Its range of services in track technology includes industrial and local traffic turnouts as well as rail assembly, and the supply of new and used materials such as sleepers made of wood, concrete and steel, turnout sleepers, rails, switches, track yokes, buffer stops and small irons. In the mechanical engineering sector, it specialises in services for wheelset presses, wheelset processing machines, measuring technology for wheelsets and workshop equipment. In 2019, it had an annual average of 102 employees with low staff turnover.
