= Kaftan (surname) =

Kaftan is a surname. People include:

- Dirk Kaftan (born 1971), German conductor
- Fred F. Kaftan (1916–2001), member of the Wisconsin State Senate
- George Kaftan (1928–2018), American basketball player
- Julius Kaftan (1848–1926), German Protestant theologian
- Vylar Kaftan, American science fiction and fantasy writer
