= Pfefferpotthast =

German dish

- Place of origin: Germany
- Region or state: Westphalia
- Main ingredients: Beef, pepper, lard, onions, lemon, bay leaves, cloves, pumpernickel

Pfefferpotthast (German pronunciation: [ˈpfɛfɐˌpɔthast]; Low German: Piäpperpottharst) is a traditional German stew. It comes from the cuisine of Westphalia.

== Preparation ==
In a traditional Pfefferpotthast, beef seared in lard and sautéed onions are simmered with spices such as bay leaves and cloves until they fall apart. It is seasoned with pepper and sometimes capers and lemon juice. Pfefferpotthast is thickened with pumpernickel bread crumbs instead of flour to make a stew. In the summer, it is served with boiled potatoes and salad. In the winter, it is served with pickled cucumbers and beetroot.

== History and customs ==
The dish was first mentioned in a story on Agnes von der Vierbecke written in 1378 in Dortmund. The name is a combination of the German words for "pepper," "pot," and "boiled meat." The significance of the word "pfeffer" is not clear. It could be an indication that it is seasoned with pepper, but it is more likely that it indicates any heavily seasoned broth or dish.

In some cities, it is customary to serve this dish in autumn. In Dortmund, the Pfefferpotthastfest is celebrated annually in autumn in Alter Markt (transl. old market). In Westhofen, the Pfefferpotthast is a characteristic part of Sup Peiter, the day that marks the end of winter.
