= Otto Ritschl =

German theologian (1860–1944)

Otto Karl Albrecht Ritschl (26 June 1860 in Bonn – 28 September 1944 in Bonn) was a German theologian, the son of Albrecht Ritschl.

After studying at Göttingen, Bonn and Giessen, he became professor at Kiel (extraordinarius) in 1889 and afterwards at Bonn (extraordinarius 1894; ordinarius 1897). He published, among other works, Schleiermachers Stellung zum Christentum in seinen Reden über die Religion (1888), and a Life of his father (2 vols, 1829–96).

== Selected works ==
- Cyprian von Karthago und die Verfassung der Kirche. Eine kirchengeschichtliche und kirchenrechtliche Untersuchung Göttingen: Vandenhoeck & Ruprecht, 1885.
- Albrecht Ritschls Leben (2 voll., Freiburg i.B.: J.C.B. Mohr, 1892-1896).
- Dogmengeschichte des Protestantismus. Grundlagen und Grundzüge der theologischen Gedenken- und Lehrbildung in den protestantischen Kirchen Leipzig: J. C. Hinrichs, 1908–27.
- System und systematische Methode in der Geschichte des wissenschaftlichen Sprachgebrauchs und der philosophischen Methodologie Bonn: Carl Georgi, Universitats-Buchdruckerei und Verlag, 1906.
