= Carl Stange =

German theologian

Carl Stange (7 March 1870 in Hamburg – 5 December 1959 in Göttingen) was a German Protestant theologian and philosopher. In his work, he mainly dealt with issues of ethics and the philosophy of religion.

He studied theology, history and philosophy at the universities of Halle, Göttingen, Leipzig and Jena, obtaining his habilitation for systematic theology in 1895 at Halle. In 1903 he became an associate professor at the University of Königsberg, and during the following year, was named a full professor of systematic theology at the University of Greifswald, where in 1911/12 he served as university rector. In 1912 he was appointed professor of systematic and practical theology at the University of Göttingen.

In 1932 he was named abbot at the Kloster Bursfelde. He was founder (1909) and editor of the journal Zeitschrift für Systematische Theologie.

== Selected works ==
- Die Christliche Ethik in ihrem Verhältnis zur modernen Ethik, 1892 – Christian ethics in its relation to modern ethics.
- Die systematischen principien in der theologie des Johann Musaeus (inaugural thesis, 1895) – The systematic principles in the theology of Johannes Musaeus.
- Einleitung in die Ethik (2 volumes 1900–01) – Introduction to ethics.
- Das Problem Tolstois, 1903 – The problem of Tolstoy.
- Die ältesten ethischen disputationen Luthers, 1904 – The earliest ethical disputations of Martin Luther.
- Theologische Aufsätze, 1905 – Theological essays.
- Der dogmatische Ertrag der Ritschlschen Theologie nach Julius Kaftan, 1906 – The dogmatic yield of Albrecht Ritschl's theology according to Julius Kaftan.
- Akademische Predigten, 1907 – Academic sermons.
- Das Frömmigkeitsideal der modernen Theologie, 1907 – The piety aspect of modern theology.
- Grundriss der Religionsphilosophie, 1907 – Outline of philosophy of religion.
- Die Ethik Kants : zur Einführung in die Kritik der praktischen Vernunft, 1920 – The ethics of Immanuel Kant; an introduction to the critique of practical reason.
- Erasmus und Julius II; eine legende, 1937 – Erasmus and Pope Julius II, a legend.
