= Wilhelm Herrmann =

German theologian

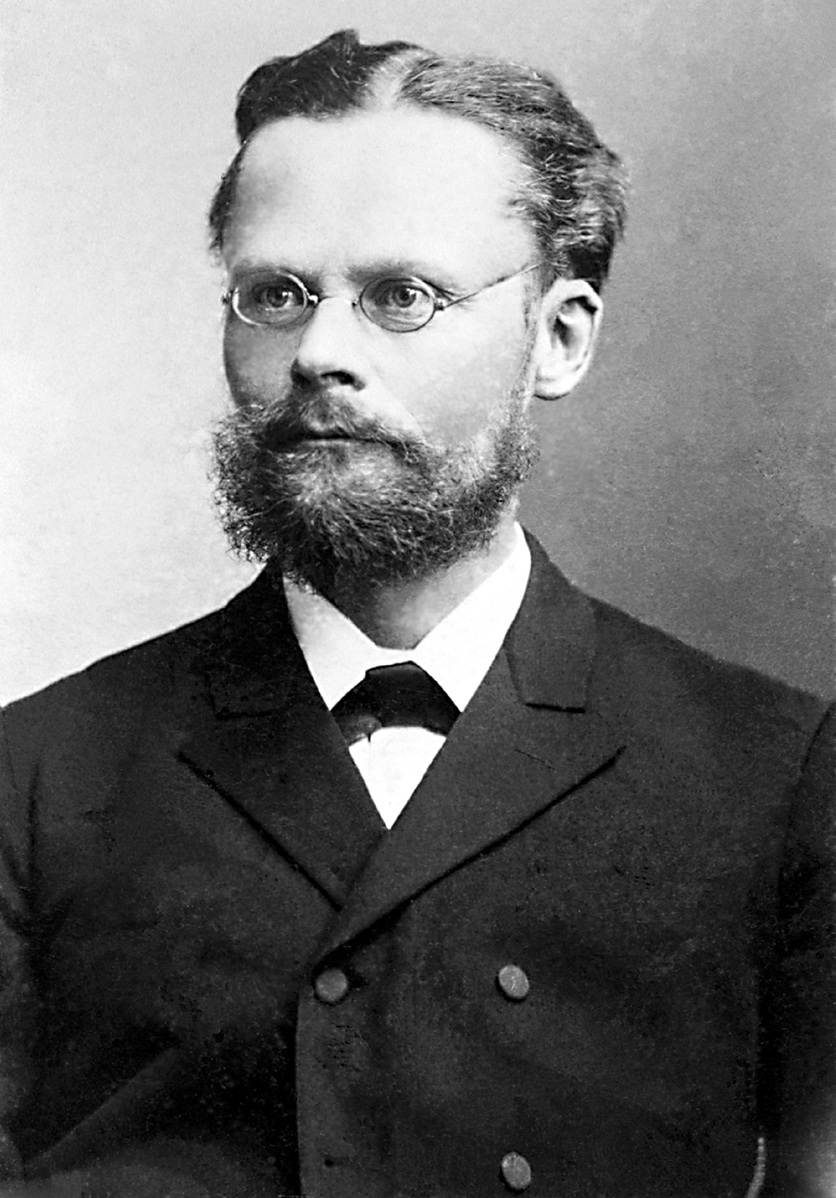
- Johann Georg Wilhelm Herrmann (1846-1922), Lutheran German theologian
- Born: Johann Georg Wilhelm Herrmann; 6 December 1846; Melkow, Kingdom of Saxony
- Died: 2 January 1922 (aged 75); Marburg, Germany
- Occupations: Professor, theologian
- Notable work: The Communion of the Christian with God

Academic background
- Education: University of Halle

Academic work
- Institutions: University of Halle; University of Marburg
- Notable students: Karl Barth

Johann Georg Wilhelm Herrmann (6 December 1846 – 2 January 1922) was a Lutheran German theologian.

== Career ==
Hermann taught at Halle before becoming professor at Marburg. Influenced by Kant and Ritschl, his theology was in the idealist tradition, seeing God as the power of goodness. Jesus was to be seen as an exemplary man. Even if Jesus never existed, according to Herrmann, his traditional portrayal was still valid. His book The Communion of the Christian God was seen as a highlight of nineteenth century Liberal Christianity, although he is also credited with preserving certain conservative ideals against liberal revisionism. against which Karl Barth, one of his pupils, and dialectical theology were later to react.

Among Herrmann's most distinguished pupils were Rudolf Bultmann, Karl Barth, and John Gresham Machen. Both Barth and Machen would reject Herrmann's teaching and come to notability by their opposition to such liberal theology.

== Theological outlook ==
Herrmann's theology has been characterized as "Lutheran neo-Kantianism" and influenced by the work of Immanuel Kant, Herrmann taught "dialectical theology". He held that one can only speak of God dialectically, with two opposing statements - thesis and antithesis, "the dogmatic and the critical, the Yes and the No, the unveiling and the veiling, objectivity, and subjectivity." The goal was not to find a synthesis but to find in the tension "a space free in the middle and hopes that God himself will intervene since only God can say his Word." Herrmann also freely admitted his thinking was indebted to Friedrich Schleiermacher, who had held that the religious experience of God took place within the individual.
