= Julius Bergmann =

German philosopher (1839–1904)

Julius Bergmann (German: [ˈbɛʁkman]; 1 April 1839, Opherdike, Westphalia – 24 August 1904, Marburg) was a German neo-Kantian philosopher.

== Biography ==
At the University of Göttingen and at the Humboldt University of Berlin, Bergmann devoted himself to logic and philosophy. At Göttingen, he studied logic under Hermann Lotze.

He was appointed to the chair of philosophy at the University of Königsberg in 1872, and three years later to a similar chair at the University of Marburg.

== Works ==
- Grundlinien einer Theorie des Bewusstseins (Outlines of a theory of consciousness, 1870)
- Zur Beurteilung des Kriticismus (On judging criticism, 1875)
- Reine Logik (Pure logic, 1879)
- Sein und Erkennen (To be and to recognize, 1880)
- Die Grundprobleme der Logik (Fundamental problems in logic, 1882)
- Geschichte der Philosophie (History of philosophy, 1892–94)
- Untersuchungen über Hauptpunkte der Philosophie (Investigations on the main points of philosophy, 1900)
- System des objektiven Idealismus (A system of objective idealism, 1903)
