= Hermann Sasse =

German theologian (1895–1976)

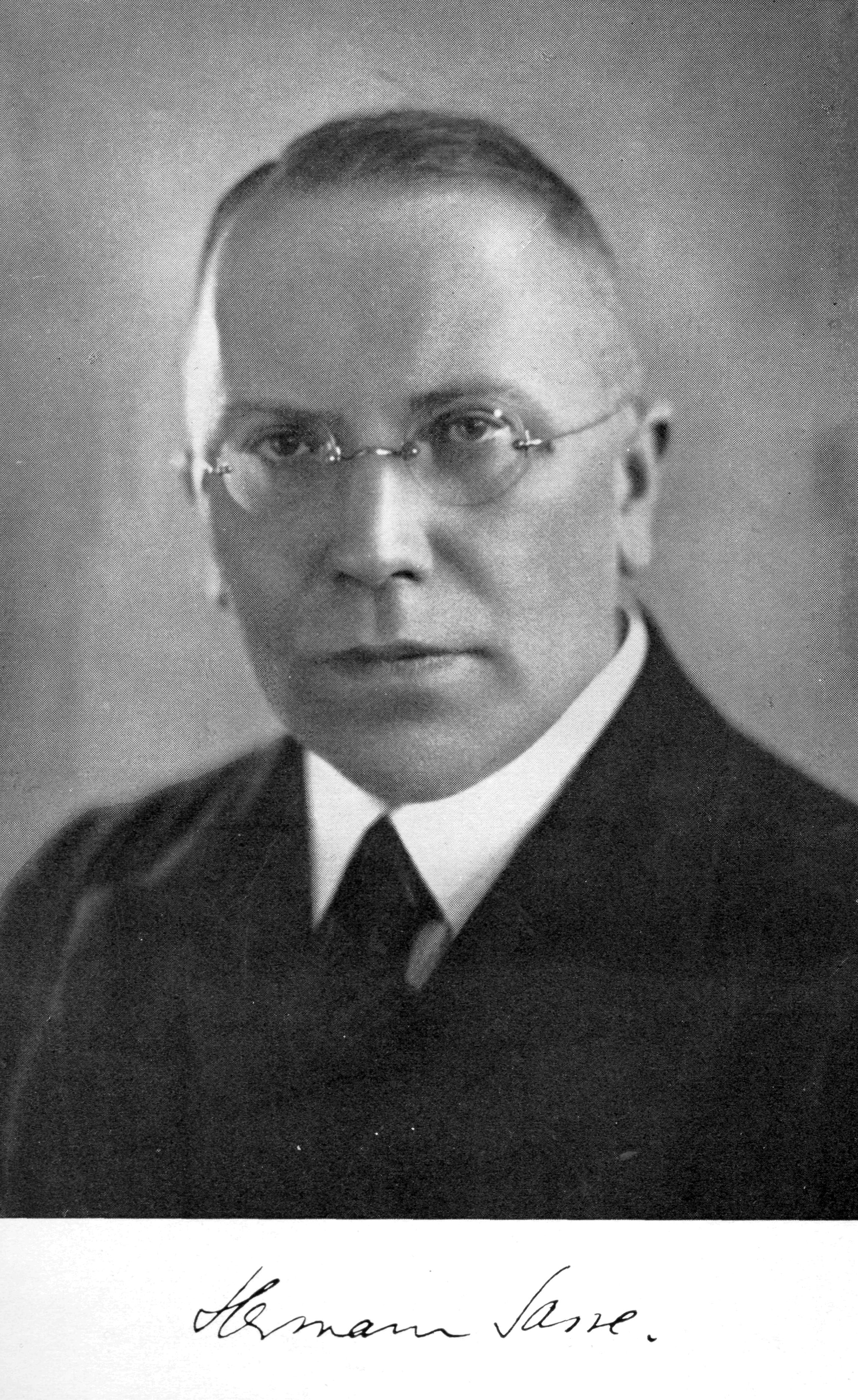
- Born: Hermann Otto Erich Sasse; 17 July 1895; Sonnewalde, Lausitz, Germany
- Died: 9 August 1976 (aged 81); Adelaide, South Australia
- Occupations: Pastor, theologian, author
- Notable work: Here We Stand; This Is My Body
- Movement: Confessional Lutheranism
- Spouse: Charlotte Margarete Naumann

Hermann Otto Erich Sasse (17 July 1895 – 9 August 1976) was a German Lutheran pastor, theologian, and author. He was considered one of the foremost confessional Lutheran theologians of the 20th century.

== Life ==
Sasse was born on 17 July 1895 in Sonnewalde, Lower Lusatia, Germany, to Hermann Sasse, a pharmacist, and his wife Maria, née Berger. In 1913, he began reading theology and ancient philology at the University of Berlin. He was a German infantryman in World War I, in which he was one of only six men in his battalion to survive the trench warfare in Flanders.

Sasse began his career under the influence of the theological liberalism of his teachers, such as Adolf Harnack. He was ordained on 13 June 1920 in St Matthew's Church in Berlin and thereafter served several parishes in Brandenburg, He took the licentiate in theology in 1923. He spent a year (1925-1926) as an exchange student at Hartford Theological Seminary in the United States, where he earned a master's degree. Sasse returned to Germany to take up a teaching position at University of Erlangen.

He married Charlotte Margarete Naumann on 11 September 1928 at St. Nicolai's Church in Oranienburg, Germany. They had three children together. During the Depression, he was a Sozialpfarrer (pastor with social duties) among factory workers in Berlin.

During this period, he became an active participant in the ecumenical movement. He attended the first world conference of the Faith and Order Movement in Lausanne, Switzerland in 1927 as a delegate and translator. He also attended the Conference for the Reduction and Limitation of Armaments in Geneva in 1932.

In the early 1930s, he emerged as a vocal critic of the Nazi Party and Germany's new chancellor, Adolf Hitler, as part of the Confessing Church Movement led by Martin Niemöller. While he did not sign the 1934 Barmen Declaration, he did author, with Dietrich Bonhoeffer and others, the first draft of the lesser known Bethel Confession of 1933, which addressed the treatment of Jews. However, he left the Confessing Church in 1934 because he believed it was improperly taking church authority for itself.

In 1933, he became a professor of church history at the University of Erlangen in Bavaria. The Nazi government took away his passport in 1935, but he was able to continue working throughout the Nazi era because he was a popular lecturer and the dean of the faculty was able to protect him.

In 1948, he opposed the formation of the Evangelical Church in Germany, in part because he distrusted state-supported university faculties of theology. As a result, he joined the Lutheran Free Church.

In 1949, Sasse emigrated to Adelaide, South Australia, where he served on the faculty of Immanuel Seminary of the United Evangelical Lutheran Church of Australia. He was heavily involved in the effort merging that body with the Evangelical Lutheran Church in Australia to create the Lutheran Church of Australia in 1966.

Sasse remained involved in Lutheranism throughout the world. He was known in the United States as "Mr. Lutheran" and regularly corresponded with Lutheran leaders there and elsewhere. A noted conservative voice in Lutheranism, his theological research focused on Scripture as Word of God and on the Eucharist. He was involved with the Australian Roman Catholic-Lutheran dialogue from its beginnings.

Sasse retired from teaching in 1969. The Federal Republic of Germany appointed him to the Order of Merit. He died in a fire at his home in North Adelaide on 9 August 1976 and was buried in Centennial Park Cemetery.

== Selected bibliography ==
Sasse published 479 works during his lifetime. Some of the more notable ones are:

- This Is My Body: Luther's Contention for the Real Presence in the Sacrament of the Altar. (Eugene, OR: Wipf & Stock, 2001) ISBN 1-57910-766-4
- The Lonely Way: Selected Essays and Letters of Hermann Sasse: 1941-1976 (Concordia Publishing House, 2003) ISBN 0-7586-0004-6
- The Lonely Way: Selected Essays and Letters of Hermann Sasse: 1927-1939 (Concordia Publishing House, 2002) ISBN 0-570-01640-1
- Christ and His Church: Essays by Hermann Sasse: Vol. 1, Union and Confession (Office of the President LCMS 1997)
