= Agnes von der Vierbecke =

Medieval German woman (c.1341–1378)

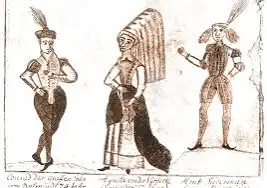
Agnes von der Vierbecke in German Mythology

Agnes von der Vierbecke, also Agneta (c. 1341 in Hengsen (today Holzwickede) – 4 October 1378 in Dortmund) is the only medieval woman from Holzwickede and Dortmund to be documented in the historical record. Agnes is known for her participation in the feud between the Dortmunders and Count Dietrich von Dinslaken, a brother of Count von der Mark.

== Early life ==
Agnes was born and raised on the noble estate of Haus Vierbecke in Hengsen. She married a Dortmund patrician named Sudermann and had a son with him, Arnold (or Arnt) Sudermann.

== Attempt to smuggle Dinslaken's soldiers into Dortmund ==
After she was widowed, Agnes became a friend of Count Dietrich von Dinslaken. She is alleged to have become involved in Dinslaken's attempt to take over the town of Dortmund. According to tradition, Agnes agreed to help smuggle Count Dietrich's soldiers into the heavily fortified town of Dortmund on 4 October 1378, the Sunday after Michaelmas.

A troop of soldiers hid in one of Agnes' hay wagons, along with a load of wood, and Agnes drove the wagon to Dortmund's Wißstrasse Gate. Her son Arnold accompianied her with a second hay wagon. Hidden in the bushes in front of the gate was young Count Conrad von Dortmund with his armed men, waiting to assist in an attack.

Agnes told the guards at the gate that the wood in her wagon was hers, in order to smuggle her load of soldiers into the town.

Next Agnes parked her wagon next to the outer gate, ensuring that it could no longer be closed. The gatekeeper, Hermann Rübenkamp, knew Agnes personally, and did not suspect any ill intentions.

Then Agnes asked gatekeeper Rübenkamp to bring her a pot of pepper stew from a market stand. The gatekeeper agreed, and went to fetch it, abandoning his post. When he left, Agnes proceeded to climb up the Wißstrasse Gate tower, and gave a signal with a white handkerchief for the enemy troops to attack.

However, the gatekeeper had left the inner gate closed when he went to fetch the stew, so the attack failed. The attackers were slain by the Dortmund guards and militia.

== Execution ==
The Dortmunders quickly uncovered Agnes' ruse. Agnes was arrested for treason at the Wißstrasse Gate, along with her two helpers, her son Arnold and the young Count Conrad von Dortmund.

All three were tried and sentenced on the same day, along with the overly helpful gate guard. Arnold, young Count Conrad, and gate guard Rübenkamp were beheaded. Agnes was allegedly burned to death on her wooden hay wagon.

== Controversy over her innocence ==
Count Dietrich and his allies swore that Agnes was innocent. The elder Count of Dortmund and Agnes' brother, Johann von Wickede, accused the imperial city council of an unjust deed. The accusations appeared in a letter sent by the Dortmunders to the council of Danzig regarding the legality of the condemnation.

A women's history website based in Dortmund claims that there is no evidence in sources as to what exactly Agnes did, but rather that she has been the subject of various tales, poems, and two theater pieces.

== Legacy ==
Ten years after Agnes' death, Count Engelbert III von der Mark declared that the hasty executions were unjustified. Count Englebert used the executions as a reason for embarking on the Great Dortmund Feud. Agnes' family and the Dortmund Council only made peace when the Great Feud was concluded in 1392.

The "betrayal" of Agnes von der Vierbecke, and the victory over cunning Count Dietrich von Dinslaken, is still present in the collective memory in Dortmund. Every year, the event is commemorated at the Pepper Pot Festival, held at the end of September and the beginning of November at the Old Market.

== Bibliography ==
- Hanne Hieber: Agnes von der Vierbecke. Verräterin von Dortmund oder unschuldig verbrannt auf dem Markt der Stadt?, in: Heimat Dortmund 2/2003, pp. 12–14, ISSN 0932-9757
- August Meininghaus: Der Verrat Agnetens von der Vierbecke in Chronik und Geschichte, in: Beiträge zur Geschichte Dortmunds und der Grafschaft Mark 22, 1913, pp. 311–318
- Johann Dietrich von Steinen: Westphälische Geschichte, Theil I, Lemgo: Meyer, 1755, p. 469f.
