= Liberalism and Christianity =

The relationship between liberalism and Christianity represents a complex and continually interacting balance of political, theological, and cultural forces. While liberalism focuses on individual freedoms, equality, and secular leadership, Christianity in its multifaceted religious character has simultaneously shaped and been defined by liberal thought.

== Historical development ==
=== Enlightenment influence ===
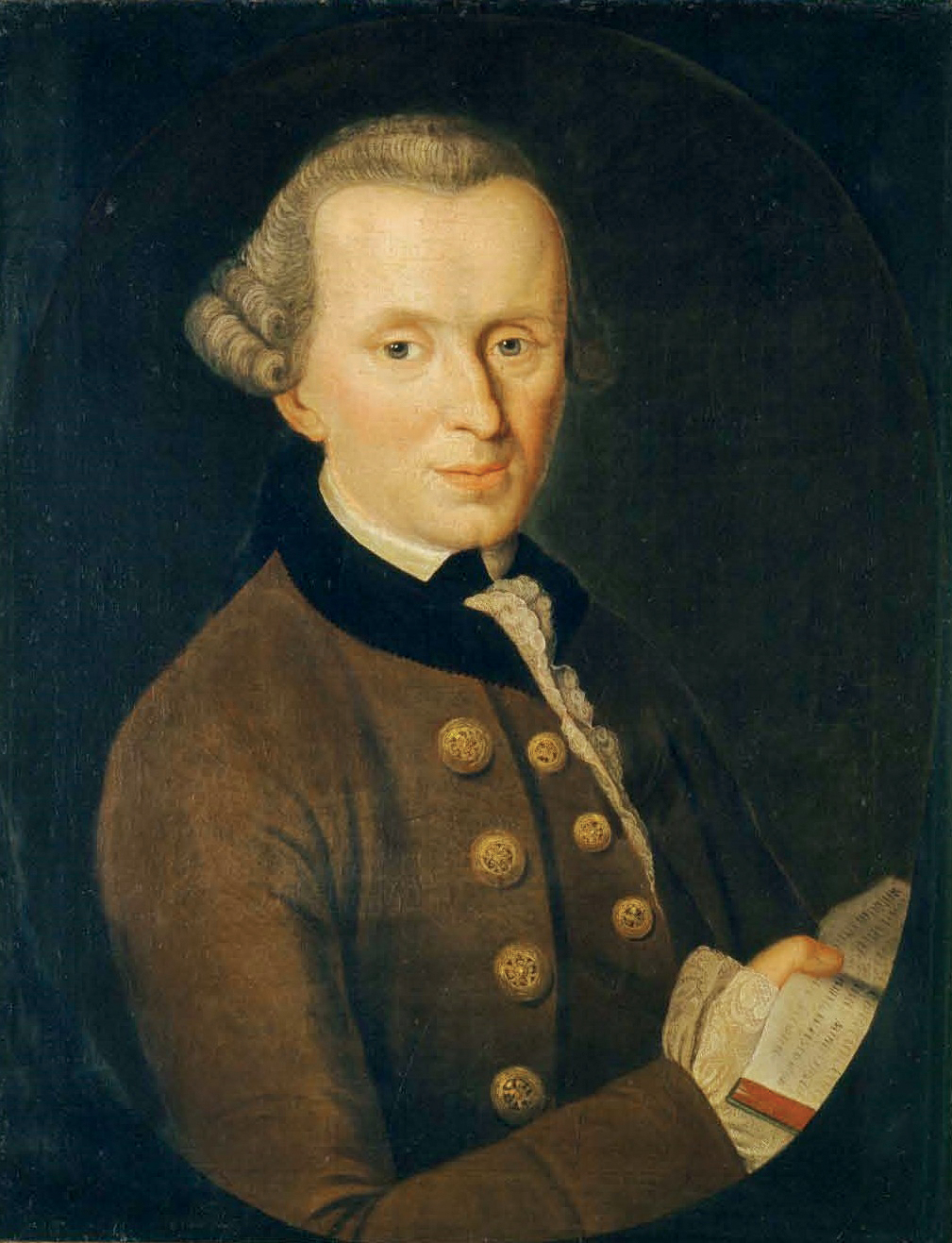
Portrait of Immanuel Kant by Johann Gottlieb Becker, 1768

The Enlightenment era introduced a belief in reason, individualism, and skepticism of traditional authority that radically changed Christian theology in the 17th and 18th centuries. Thinkers like Immanuel Kant supported human autonomy in knowledge at the expense of established religious doctrines. The period thus prepared what is called liberal theology, an attempt to bring Christian faith into step with modern developments in thought.

=== 19th Century liberal theology ===
Theologians of the 19th century, like Friedrich Schleiermacher, relied more on personal religious experience than on doctrinal orthodoxy and grounded faith in a feeling of absolute dependence upon God. Albrecht Ritschl took this view further, but he focused on the ethical teachings of Jesus and the social significance of the Gospel. These approaches to Christianity broke with the conventional interpretations because it brought these ways of understanding Christianity closer to the moral and the philosophical thought of their times.

== Key movements and concepts ==
=== Liberal Protestantism ===
Liberal Protestantism was a reaction to the modern scientific challenges, historical criticism, and changes in the secular culture. It rested on the use of reason and experience in interpreting scripture, discarding literal understandings for metaphorical and allegorical interpretations. A theological movement that tried to make Christianity relevant to modern society maintained ethical living and social justice.

=== Progressive Christianity ===
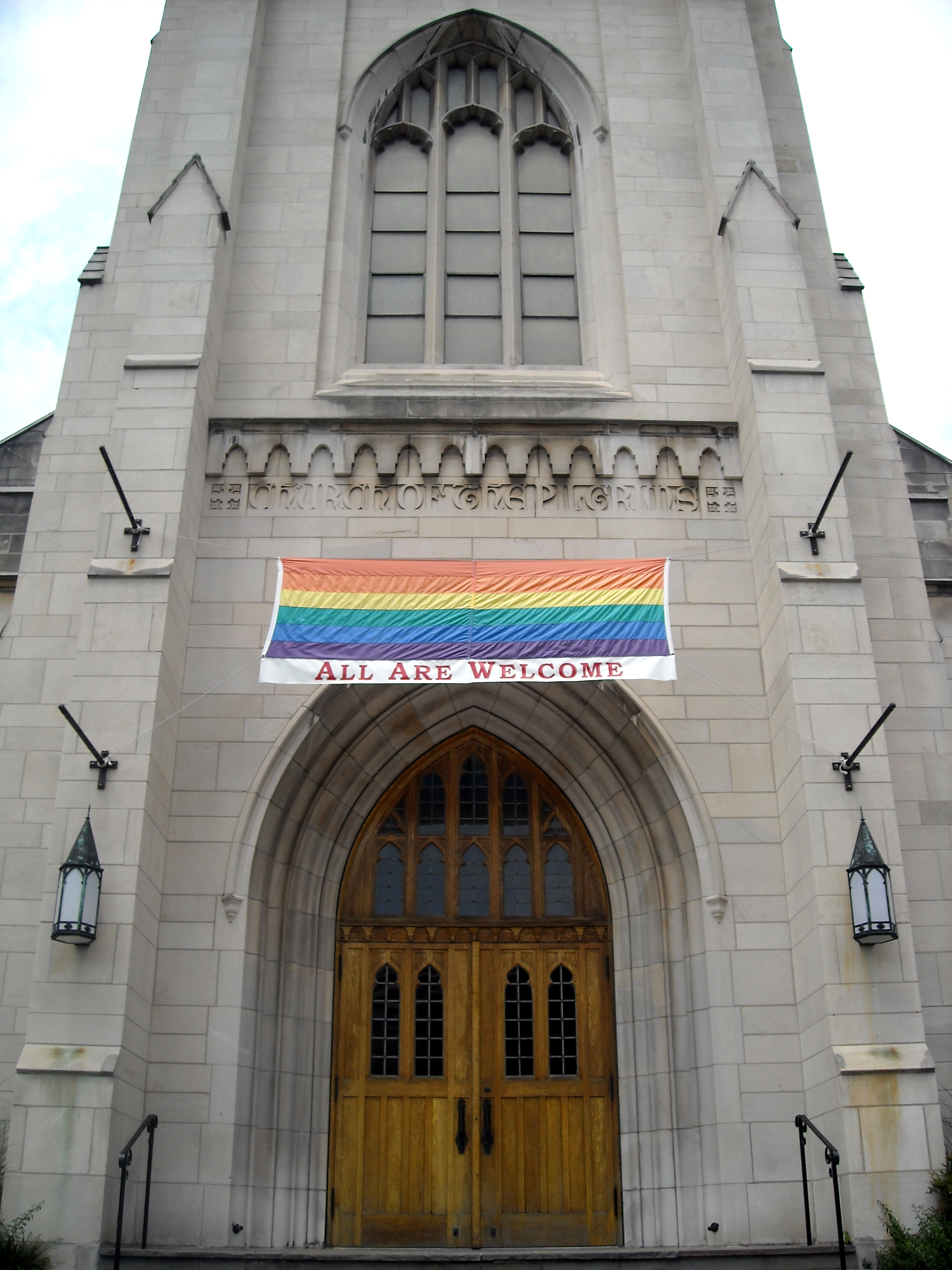
Church of the Pilgrims entrance

Building upon liberal theology, Progressive Christianity emphasizes inclusivity, social justice, and environmental stewardship. It often challenges traditional doctrines and embraces a more pluralistic approach to faith. Organizations like ProgressiveChristianity.org advocate for a faith that is open to new ideas and responsive to contemporary issues.

=== Liberal Catholicism ===
Within the Catholic tradition, liberalism expressed itself through the movement for separation of church and state, through demands for religious freedom, and through advocating democratic reforms. Proponents such as Félicité Robert de Lamennais and Charles Forbes René de Montalembert led the movement in the 19th century. Such movements were frequently opposed by the Vatican, which officially condemned certain encyclicals containing liberal principles

== Contemporary perspectives ==
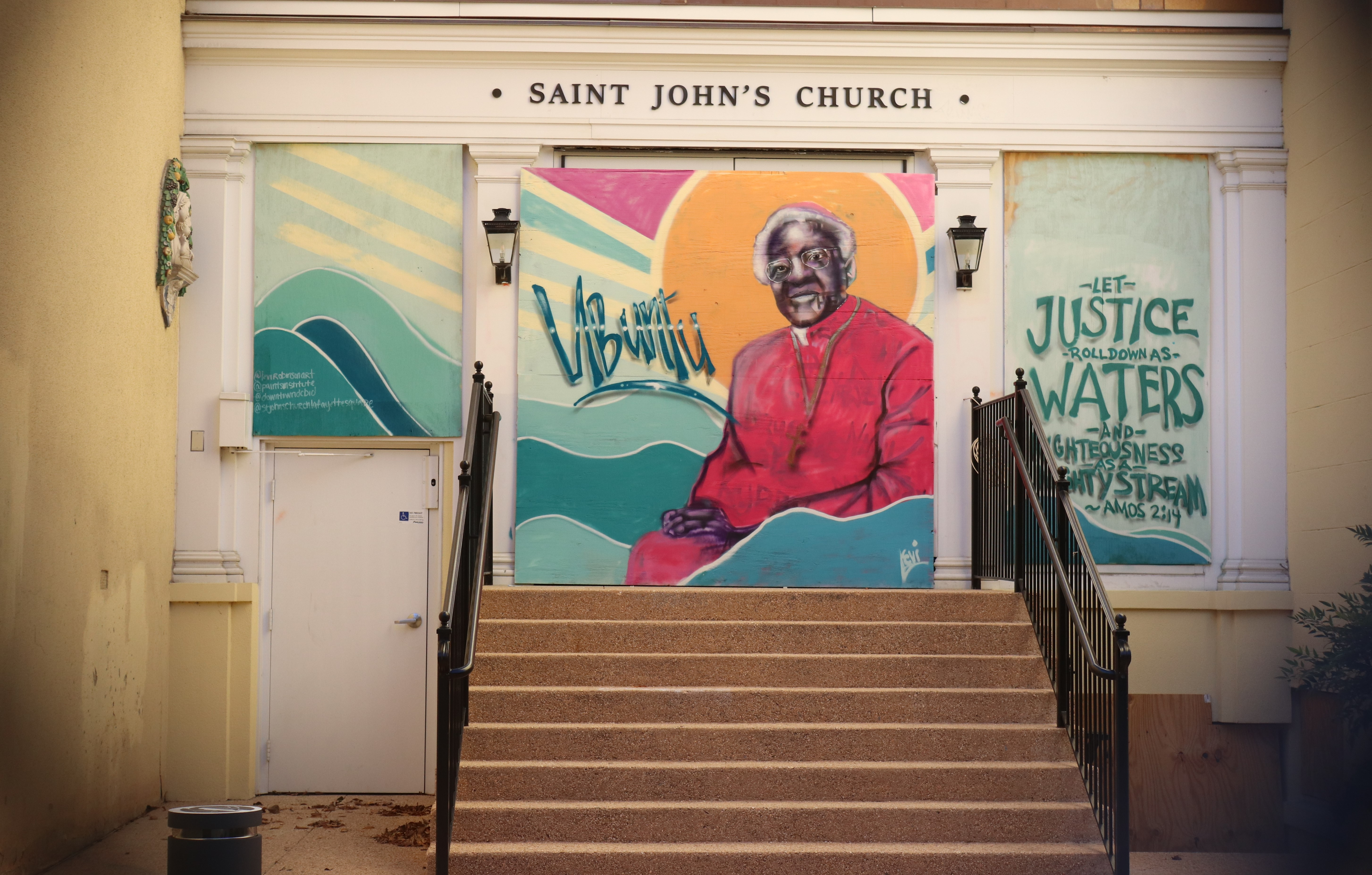
Painting of Desmond Tutu with the word "ubuntu"

Nevertheless, today, liberalism and Christianity remain dynamic. Christians interact with liberalism as a means of addressing contemporary issues like gay rights, race, and environmental concerns. On a contrasting position, some conservative Christians find liberal theology deviates from classic beliefs. This debate is a representation of the dynamic aspect of religious beliefs within a rapidly changing society. Some conservative Christians even contend that liberalism is a separate religion from Christianity. Roger E. Olson, a theologian in America, wrote a book titled "Against Liberal Theology Putting The Brakes On Progressive Christianity." Essentially, liberal theology is distinct from regular Christianity as it permits "modern knowledge, whatever that is at a given moment, to stand in authority over the Bible in the most significant issues." This immediately results in rejection or reinterpretation of key beliefs that define Christianity, such as Christ's deity and the truthfulness of the Resurrection per Roger E. Olson.

== List of Liberal Christian political parties ==
=== Liberal Christian political parties ===
Country	Party	Status	Ideology	Position
European Union	European People's Party	Government	Christian democracy, Liberal conservatism	Centre-right
Austria	Austrian People's Party	Government	Christian democracy, Liberal conservatism	Centre-right
Cape Verde	Movement for Democracy	Government	Liberalism, Christian Democracy	Centre-Centre-right
Cyprus	Democratic Rally	Opposition	Liberal conservatism, Christian democracy	Centre-right
Czech Republic	TOP 09	Opposition	Liberal conservatism, pro-Europeanism	Centre-right
France	Democratic Movement	Government	Liberalism, Christian Democracy	Centre-Centre-right
Ireland	Fianna Fáil	Government	Christian democracy, Irish Republicanism	Centre-Centre-right
Ireland	Fine Gael	Government	Christian democracy, Liberal conservatism	Centre-right
Italy	Democratic Centre	Opposition	Christian left, Social liberalism	Centre-Centre-left
Italy	Forza Italia (2013)	Government	Liberal conservatism, Christian democracy	Centre-right
Lebanon	Free Patriotic Movement	Opposition	Christian democracy, Nationalism	Centre-right-Right wing
Lebanon	Lebanese Forces	Government	Christian democracy, Liberal conservatism	Right wing
Poland	Civic Platform	Government	Christian democracy, Liberal conservatism	Centre-right
Poland	Poland 2050	Government	Christian Democracy, Social conservatism	Centre-right
Poland	Polish People's Party	Government	Christian democracy, Agrarianism	Centre-right-Right wing
Portugal	Social Democratic Party	Government	Liberal conservatism, Christian democracy	Centre-right
Romania	National Liberal Party	Government	Christian Democracy, Social conservatism	Centre-right
Spain	People's Party	Opposition	Christian democracy, Liberal conservatism	Centre-right-Right wing
Uruguay	National Party	Opposition	Liberal conservatism, Christian democracy	Centre-right
Liechtenstein	Patriotic Union	Government	Liberal conservatism, Christian democracy	Centre-Centre-right

== See also ==
- Liberal Christianity
- Progressive Christianity
- Liberal theology
- Secularism
- Christian Democracy
- Separation of church and state
