= Johann Eduard Erdmann =

German philosopher (1805–1892)

The Reverend Johann Eduard Erdmann
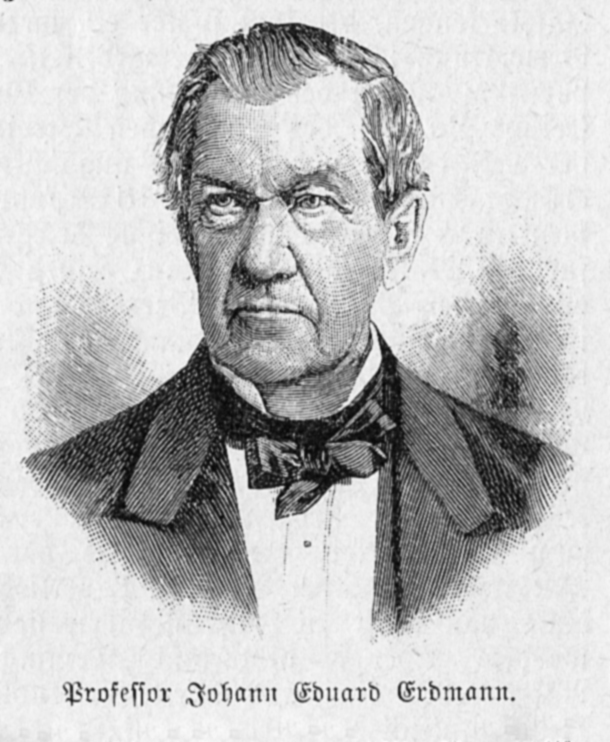
- Born: 13 June 1805; Wolmar, Governorate of Livonia, Russian Empire (now Valmiera, Latvia)
- Died: 12 June 1892 (aged 86); Halle, German Empire

Education
- Education: Imperial University of Dorpat; University of Berlin; University of Kiel (PhD, 1830)
- Thesis: Quidnam sit discrimen philosophiam inter et theologiam (What is the Distinction between Philosophy and Theology?) (1830)
- Academic advisor: G. W. F. Hegel

Philosophical work
- Era: 19th-century philosophy
- Region: Western philosophy
- School: German idealism Old Hegelians
- Institutions: University of Halle
- Notable students: Kuno Fischer; Albrecht Ritschl
- Main interests: Metaphysics, philosophy of religion
- Notable ideas: Convergence of philosophy and religion toward a common truth Coining the term "psychologism"

Johann Eduard Erdmann (German: [ˈeːɐ̯tman]; 13 June 1805 – 12 June 1892) was a German Lutheran pastor, historian of philosophy, and philosopher of religion, of which he wrote on the mediation of faith and knowledge. He was known to be a follower of Friedrich Schleiermacher, whom he studied under August Carlblom, and Georg Wilhelm Friedrich Hegel, whom he regarded as his mentor. Erdmann also studied the works of Karl Daub. Historians of philosophy usually include Erdmann as a member of the Right Wing of the Hegelian movement, a group of thinkers who were also referred to variously as the Right Hegelians (Rechtshegelianer), the Hegelian Right (die Hegelsche Rechte), and/or as the Old Hegelians (Althegelianer).

== Biography ==
Erdmann was born on 13 June 1805 in Wolmar, Livonia, where his father was a Lutheran pastor.

Erdmann studied theology at the Imperial University of Dorpat and afterward at Berlin, where he fell under the influence of Georg Wilhelm Friedrich Hegel, and was known never to miss Hegel's lectures. Then, from 1829 to 1832 he was a minister of religion in his native town of Wolmar. Afterwards he resigned from his position as pastor to devote himself to education and philosophy, but continued to minister throughout his life. He obtained a doctoral degree from the University of Kiel with the treatise, Quidnam sit discrimen philosophiam inter et theologiam (What is the Distinction between Philosophy and Theology?), written in 1830, in which he argued that philosophy and religion converge to a common truth, even though they differ in form of approach. In 1834 he began writing his Habilitation thesis to qualify in Berlin. This became volume 1 of his work titled Versuch einer wissenschaftlichen Darstellung der Geschichte der neuern Philosophie (6 vols., 1834–1853; Attempt at a Scientific Presentation of the History of Modern Philosophy). In 1836 he was professor-extraordinary at Halle, became a full professor in 1839, and remained there until his death. He died on 12 June 1892, aged 86, in Halle, one day before his 87th birthday.

He published many philosophical textbooks and treatises, and a number of sermons; but his chief claim to remembrance rests on his elaborate Grundriss der Geschichte der Philosophie (Outline of the History of Philosophy, 2 vols, 1866), the 4th edition of which has been translated into English. Erdmann's special merit is that he does not rest content with being a mere summarizer of opinions, but tries to exhibit the history of human thought as a continuous and ever-developing effort to solve the great speculative problems with which man has been confronted in all ages. His chief other works were: Leib und Seele (Body and Soul, 1837), Grundriss der Psychologie (Outline of Psychology, 1840), Grundriss der Logik und Metaphysik (Outline of Logic and Metaphysics, 1841), and Psychologische Briefe (Psychological Letters, 1851).

Erdmann had many readers, students, and followers, and influenced many intellectuals of his time. Some of these include Niels Thulstrup, his student Albrecht Ritschl, his colleague Martin Kähler, and members of the Hegelian school, such as Kuno Fischer, Bruno Bauer, Ludwig Feuerbach and Karl Ludwig Michelet. Søren Kierkegaard studied and was inspired in his early studies by Erdmann's works, in particular his Vorlesungen über Glauben und Wissen als Einleitung in die Dogmatic und Religionphilosophie (Lectures on Faith and Knowledge as an Introduction to Dogmatic [Theology] and the Philosophy of Religion). Although Kierkegaard integrated much of Erdmann's work into his own, the only work in which Erdmann was cited by him was his dissertation On the Concept of Irony with Continual Reference to Socrates.

== Commentary on Erdmann ==
John Dewey wrote in the Andover Review:

The combination of qualities necessary to produce a work of the scope and grade of Erdmann's is rare. ...Erdmann wrote his book [A History of Philosophy: Ancient and Mediaeval Philosophy], not as a reference book... but as a genuine history of philosophy, tracing in a genetic way the development of thought in its treatment of philosophic problems. Its purpose is to develop philosophic intelligence rather than to furnish information. ...Erdmann unites a minute and exhaustive knowledge of philosophic sources at first hand, equalled over the entire field of philosophy probably by no other one man... To the student who wishes... a somewhat detailed knowledge of the evolution of thought, and of what this and the other writers have contributed to it, Erdmann is indispensable; there is no substitute.

== Selected works ==
- A History of Philosophy Vol. 1 Ancient and Mediæval Philosophy (1893)
- A History of Philosophy Vol. 2 Modern Philosophy (1897)
- A History of Philosophy Vol. 3 German Philosophy Since Hegel (1890)
- Outlines of Logic and Metaphysics (1896)
