= Holzwickede =

- Municipality
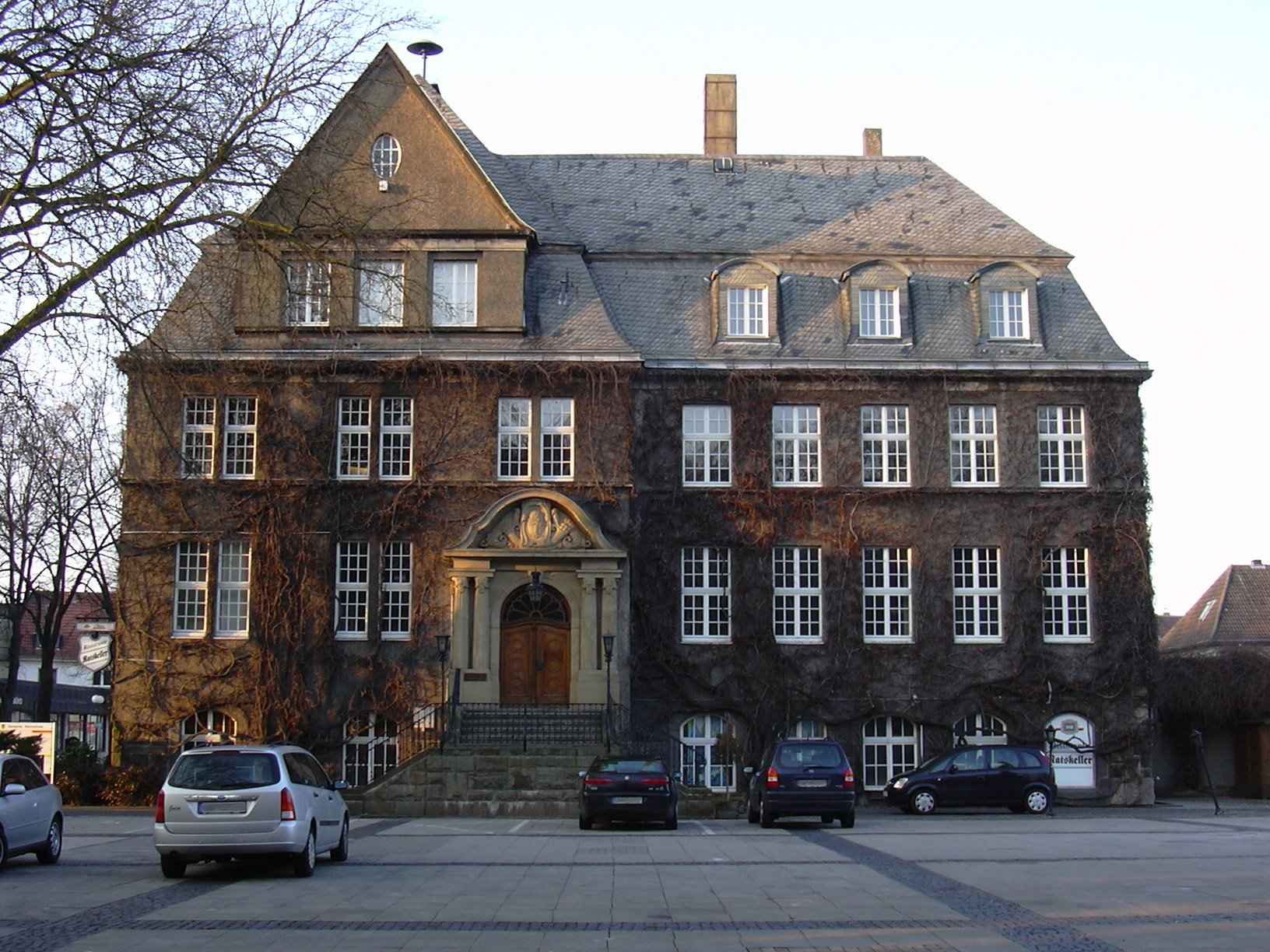
- Town hall

- Coat of arms

- Location of Holzwickede within Unna district
- Interactive map of Holzwickede
- Location within Germany Location within North Rhine-Westphalia
- Coordinates: 51°30′N 7°37′E
- Country: Germany
- State: North Rhine-Westphalia
- Admin. region: Arnsberg
- District: Unna

Government
  - Mayor (2020–25): Ulrike Drossel

Area
  - Total: 22.36 km^{2} (8.63 sq mi)
- Elevation: 109–202 m (358–663 ft)

Population (2025-12-31)
  - Total: 17,543
  - Density: 784.6/km^{2} (2,032/sq mi)
- Time zone: UTC+01:00 (CET)
  - Summer (DST): UTC+02:00 (CEST)
- Postal codes: 59439
- Dialling codes: 02301
- Vehicle registration: UN
- Website: www.holzwickede.de

Holzwickede (German pronunciation: [hɔltsˈvɪkədə]) is a municipality in the district of Unna in North Rhine-Westphalia, Germany.

It is twinned with Weymouth, Louviers and Colditz.

== Population ==
Historical population

Year	Pop.	±% p.a.
1965	12,214	—
1970	13,091	+1.40%
1975	13,965	+1.30%
1980	15,754	+2.44%
1985	16,450	+0.87%
1990	16,402	−0.06%
1995	17,414	+1.20%

Year	Pop.	±% p.a.
2000	17,600	+0.21%
2005	17,571	−0.03%
2010	17,180	−0.45%
2015	17,085	−0.11%
2020	16,964	−0.14%
2025	17,543	+0.67%

Source: Landesdatabank Nordrhein-Westfalen

== Mayors ==
- 1969–1975: Josef Wortmann
- 1975–1989: Heinrich Schürhoff
- 1989–1999: Margret Mader
- 1999–2015: Jenz Rother
- since 2015: Ulrike Drossel

== People from Holzwickede ==
- Agnes von der Vierbecke ( 1341-1378), commemorated at Dortmund's Pepper Pot Festival
- Julius Bergmann (1839-1904), philosopher
- Hermann Mandel (1882-1946), theologian
- Hermann Strathmann (1882-1966), theologian and politician
- Nils Mönkemeyer (born 1978), violist and academic teacher
