= Julius Schaller =

German philosopher (1810-1868)

Julius Schaller (German: [ˈʃalɐ]; July 13, 1810 – June 21, 1868) was a German Hegelian philosopher, born in Magdeburg.

== Biography ==
Schaller studied theology and philosophy at the University of Halle, where in 1834 he received his habilitation. In 1838 he became an associate professor at Halle, where in 1861 he was appointed a full professor.

Schaller was an ardent supporter of Hegel's philosophy, and two of his earlier works, Die Philosophie unserer Zeit (The Philosophy of Our Time, 1837) and Der historische Christus und die Philosophie (The Historical Christ and Philosophy, 1838) were written in defense of Hegelianism.

He died in Carlsfeld near Brehna.

== Publications ==
Other noted publications by Schaller include:

- Geschichte der Naturphilosophie von Bacon bis auf unsere Zeit (History of nature philosophy, from Bacon to our time), 1841–46
- Vorlesungen über Schleiermacher (Lectures on Schleiermacher), 1844
- Darstellung und Kritik der Philosophie von Ludwig Feuerbach (Presentation and critique of the philosophy of Ludwig Feuerbach), 1847
- Die Phrenologie (Phrenology), 1851
- Seele und Leib (Soul and body), 1855
- Psychologie I (Das Seelenleben des Menschen), (Psychology, the soul lives of humans), 1860
