= Christian Social People's Service =

Christian Social People's Service Christlich-Sozialer Volksdienst
- Leader: Wilhelm Simpfendörfer
- Founded: December 1929; 96 years ago
- Dissolved: 1933; 93 years ago
- Split from: German National People's Party
- Ideology: Christian democracy Conservatism; Political Protestantism
- Political position: Centre-right
- Religion: Protestantism
- Electoral alliance: Christian-National Bloc (1933) (Note: Allied with the German People's Party and German Farmers' Party.)
- Colours: Blue Grey
- Most seats in the Reichstag (1930): 14 / 577

1932 election poster

The Christian Social People's Service (German: Christlich-Sozialer Volksdienst, abbreviated CSVD) was a Protestant conservative political party in the Weimar Republic.

The party's genesis lay in Adolf Stoecker's Christian Social Party, which joined the German National People's Party in 1918, and effectively functioned as the parties labor wing. The Christian social Franz Behrens wrote a substantial amount of the DNVP's 1918 platform, however the Christian socials failed to get the DNVP to endorse trade unions over company unions. The ideological differences over labor rights came to a head when Alfred Hugenberg became leader in 1929 and attacked the employment insurance scheme, which encouraged the Christian socials to consider leaving the party. At the time, the Christian socials represented the moderate tendency within the DNVP, as opposed to the radical nationalist leadership of Alfred Hugenberg. These Christian socials formed the Christliche-soziale Reichsvereinigung [Christian-social Imperial Association], and would actively oppose Hugenberg. What eventuated was a combined expulsion and resignation of the Christian socials, and other conservative elements within the party.

The CSVD drew from other political movements, such as the Christlicher Volksdienst (CVD, Christian People's Service), which dated back to 1924, and drew from Pietists and Christian Trade unions. Another Protestant party was the EV (Evangelische Volksgemeinschaft), a Hessian party. Centrist party leaders urged the EV to join with the German-Hanoverian Party to found a Protestant peoples party that would form a vote sharing agreement with the Centre Party. The EV would be absorbed by the CVD in 1929, and the Christian Socials/Christian-social Imperial Association would join with the CVD to form the CSVD in December 1929.

The CSVD was mainly supported by middle-class elements, however, it did support the Christian trade unions, and was significantly supported by the league of Christian unions. As a result of the theocratic currents in the parties Calvinist regions, the party supported state welfare, trade unions and workers participation in management. Like the Centre party, the CSVD opposed Materialism, Atheism, Liberalism and Marxism. The party would embrace co-operation with the Centre party. The CSVD was a cabinet party in the second, third and fourth Brunings ministries.

The CSVD portrayed itself as a Protestant version of the Catholic Centre and was mainly supported by middle-class elements. The CSVD contested the 1930 and 1932 parliamentary elections; the party CSVD formed a joint parliamentary group with the Christian-National Peasants' and Farmers' Party in the Reichstag. After the Nazi take-over in 1933, the CSVD was dissolved.

The President of the Federal Republic of Germany Gustav Heinemann (1969–74) was a member of CSVD during the Weimar Republic.

== Election results ==
CSVD federal election results
Election	Votes	%	Seats	+/–
1930	869,595	2.49	14 / 577 (2%)	▲14
July 1932	364,543	1.10	3 / 608 (0.5%)	▼11
November 1932	403,666	1.48	5 / 585 (0.9%)	▲2
March 1933	383,999	0.98	4 / 647 (0.6%)	▼1
