= Julius Kaftan =

German Protestant theologian

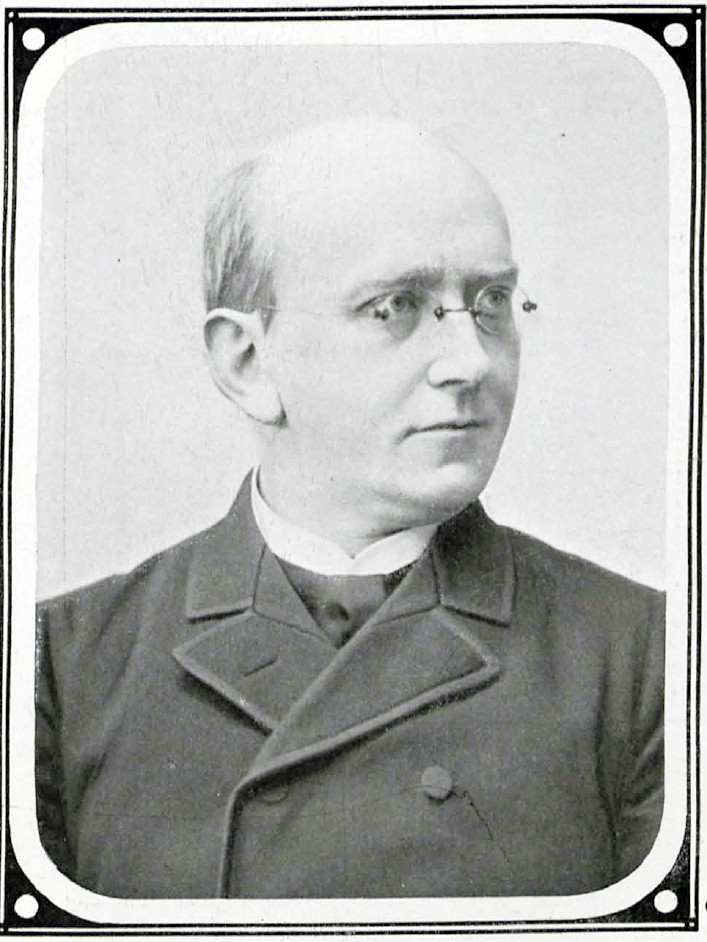
Julius Kaftan

Julius Wilhelm Martin Kaftan (30 September 1848, Loit, North Schleswig – 27 August 1926, Berlin-Steglitz) was a German Protestant theologian.

== Biography ==
Kaftan studied theology at the Universities of Erlangen, Berlin and Kiel. In 1874 he became an associate professor at the University of Basel, where in 1881 he was named a full professor of dogmatics and ethics. In 1883 he returned to Berlin as a successor to Isaak August Dorner. In 1906/07 he served as university rector.

From 1904 to 1925 he was a member of the Evangelical Oberkirchenrats (High Church Council) of the Prussian State Church, and since 1921, served as its spiritual vice-president. In this capacity, he was involved in the new church constitution of the Old Prussian Union (1922) and was chairman of the social committee of the German Federation of Protestant Churches.

Early in his career he was influenced by the teachings of Kant and Schleiermacher. Later on, he became a follower of Albrecht Ritschl, belonging to the conservative wing of the so-called "Ritschlian School". Unlike Ritschl, he placed particular emphasis on the importance of mystical experience in religion.

== Published works ==
In 1897 he first published Dogmatik, which was for many years a standard work for young theologians (8th edition, 1920). His Die Wahrheit der christlichen Religion (1888) was later translated into English and published as "The truth of the Christian religion" (1894). Other noted works by Kaftan are:

- Die Predigt des Evangeliums im modernen Geistesleben (1879) – The preaching of the Gospel in the modern spiritual life.
- Das Wesen der christlichen Religion (1881) – The essence of the Christian religion.
- Das Christentum und Nietzsches herrenmoral (1897) – Christianity and Nietzsche's master morality.
- Jesus und Paulus; eine freundschaftliche Streitschrift gegen die Religionsgeschichtlichen Volkbücker von D. Bousset und D. Wrede (1906) – Jesus and Paul; a friendly polemic against the history of religions books of Wilhelm Bousset and William Wrede.
- Philosophie des Protestantismus (1917) – Philosophy and Protestantism.
