= Denis M. Walsh =

Canadian academic and writer

Denis M. Walsh is a Canadian academic and writer. He holds the Canada Research Chair in the Philosophy of Biology and is a member of the Department of Philosophy at the Institute for the History and Philosophy of Science and Technology, and the Department for Ecology and Evolutionary Biology at the University of Toronto. His current research focuses on the concept of natural agency, referring to any system that can maintain its viability, react, and innovate by mounting adaptive responses to its conditions.

Walsh received his PhD in biology from McGill University. He later studied philosophy at King's College, Cambridge, and then on to King's College London, where he completed the MPhil and PhD (modal logic and modal metaphysics). He was awarded a Social Sciences and Humanities Research Council (Canada) Post-doctoral fellowship, which he took at the University of Wisconsin–Madison, under the supervision of Professor Elliott Sober.

In 2010 Walsh became a professor at the University of Toronto's Department of Philosophy. In 2014, with University of Toronto colleague R. Paul Thompson, he co-edited the book Evolutionary Biology: Conceptual, Ethical, and Religious Issues which was published by Cambridge University Press. Walsh's book, Organisms, Agency, and Evolution was published in 2015 by Cambridge University Press. It was reviewed by John Dupré who concluded that "Philosophers of biology, evolutionary theorists, and anyone interested in the state of the field and with a reasonable grasp of the specialist vocabulary, will need to read this book." He co-edited with Philippe Huneman the book Challenging the Modern Synthesis: Adaptation, Development, and Inheritance which was published in 2017, and in it he takes the core issue to be a tension between chance and purposefulness, and explicitly raises the question of whether the privileging of chance (i.e., blind variation and selection) is a metaphysical commitment or a methodological artifact.

Walsh was a fellow at the Paris Institute for Advanced Study in 2018-19. In 2023, he became Academic Director at the University of Toronto's Institute for the History and Philosophy of Science and Technology.

Some of Walsh's published articles are:

- 2024 (with Johannes Jaeger, Anna Riedl, Alex Djedovic and John Vervaeke) Naturalizing Relevance Realization - Why Agency and Cognition are Fundamentally not Computational Frontiers in Psychology
- 2023 Evolutionary Foundationalism: The Myth of the Chemical Given, Chapter 18 of Evolution “On Purpose": Teleonomy in Living Systems edited by Peter A. Corning, Stuart A. Kauffman, Denis Noble, James A. Shapiro, Richard I. Vane-Wright, and Addy Pross.
- 2022 (with Sonia E. Sultan and Armin P. Moczek) Bridging the explanatory gaps: What can we learn from a biological agency perspective? BioEssays 44 (1): 2100185
- 2021 Environment as Abstraction Biological Theory 17 (1): 68-79
- 2020 Variationalism and Individualism Philosophy, Theology and the Sciences 7 (2): 227-252
- 2017 (with André Ariew and Mohan Matthen) Four Pillars of Statisticalism Philosophy, Theory, and Practice in Biology 9 (1): 1-18
- 2015 Variance, Invariance and Statistical Explanation Erkenntnis 80 (3): 469-489
- 2013 Descriptions and models: Some responses to Abrams Studies in History and Philosophy of Science Part C: Studies in History and Philosophy of Biological and Biomedical Sciences 44 (3): 302-308
- 2012 Mechanism and purpose: A case for natural teleology Studies in History and Philosophy of Science Part C: Studies in History and Philosophy of Biological and Biomedical Sciences 43 (1): 173-181
- 2010 Two neo-darwinisms History and Philosophy of the Life Sciences 32 (2/3)
- 2010 Not a sure thing: Fitness, probability, and causation Philosophy of Science 77 (2): 147-171.
- 2008 A Commentary on Blute’s ‘Updated Definition’ Spontaneous Generations 2 (1): 6
- 2007 The pomp of superfluous causes: The interpretation of evolutionary theory Philosophy of Science 74 (3): 281-303
- 2007 (with Farish A. Jenkins and Robert L. Carroll) Anatomy of Eocaecilia Micropodia, A Limbed Caecilian of the Early Jurassic Bulletin of the Museum of Comparative Zoology, 158(6):285-365
- 2006 Organisms as natural purposes: The contemporary evolutionary perspective Studies in History and Philosophy of Science Part C: Studies in History and Philosophy of Biological and Biomedical Sciences 37 (4): 771-791
- 2006 Evolutionary essentialism British Journal for the Philosophy of Science 57 (2): 425-448
- 2004 Bookkeeping or metaphysics? The units of selection debate Synthese 138 (3)
- 2003 Fit and diversity: Explaining adaptive evolution Philosophy of Science 70 (2): 280-301
- 2002 (with Andre Ariew and Tim Lewens) The Trials of Life: Natural Selection and Random Drift Philosophy of Science 69 (3): 452-473
- 2000 Chasing shadows: Natural selection and adaptation Studies in History and Philosophy of Science Part A 31 (1): 135-53
- 1999 Alternative individualism Philosophy of Science 66 (4): 628-648
- 1998 The scope of selection: Sober and Neander on what natural selection explains Australasian Journal of Philosophy 76 (2)
- 1998 Wide content individualism Mind 107 (427): 625-652
- 1996 Fitness and function British Journal for the Philosophy of Science 47 (4): 553-574
- 1996 (with André Ariew) A Taxonomy of Functions Canadian Journal of Philosophy 26 (4)
- 1993 (with Farish A. Jenkins) An Early Jurassic caecilian with limbs Nature 365, pages 246–250
