= Structuralism (philosophy of science) =

Theory of science, reconstructing empirical theories

In the philosophy of science, structuralism (also known as scientific structuralism or as the structuralistic theory-concept) asserts that all aspects of reality are best understood in terms of empirical scientific constructs of entities and their relations, rather than in terms of concrete entities in themselves.

== Overview ==
Structuralism is an active research program in the philosophy of science, which was first developed in the late 1960s and throughout the 1970s by several analytic philosophers.

As an instance of structuralism, the concept of matter should be interpreted not as an absolute property of nature in itself, but instead of how scientifically grounded mathematical relations describe how the concept of matter interacts with other properties, whether that be in a broad sense such as the gravitational fields that mass-produces or more empirically as how matter interacts with sense systems of the body to produce sensations such as weight.

Structuralism's aim is to comprise all important aspects of an empirical theory in one formal framework. The proponents of this meta-theoretic theory are Frederick Suppe, Patrick Suppes, Ronald Giere, Joseph D. Sneed, Wolfgang Stegmüller, Carlos Ulises Moulines, Wolfgang Balzer, John Worrall, Elie Georges Zahar, Pablo Lorenzano, Otávio Bueno, Anjan Chakravartty, Tian Yu Cao, Steven French, and Michael Redhead.

The term "structural realism" for the variation of scientific realism motivated by structuralist arguments, was coined by American philosopher Grover Maxwell in 1968. In 1998, the British structural realist philosopher James Ladyman distinguished epistemic and ontic forms of structural realism.

== Variations ==
=== Epistemic structural realism ===
The philosophical concept of (scientific) structuralism is related to that of epistemic structural realism (ESR). ESR, a position originally and independently held by Henri Poincaré (1902), Bertrand Russell (1927), and Rudolf Carnap (1928), was resurrected by John Worrall (1989), who proposes that there is retention of structure across theory change. Worrall, for example, argued that Fresnel's equations imply that light has a structure and that Maxwell's equations, which replaced Fresnel's, do also; both characterize light as vibrations. Fresnel postulated that the vibrations were in a mechanical medium called "ether"; Maxwell postulated that the vibrations were of electric and magnetic fields. The structure in both cases is the vibrations and it was retained when Maxwell's theories replaced Fresnel's. Because structure is retained, structural realism both (a) avoids pessimistic meta-induction and (b) does not make the success of science seem miraculous, i.e., it puts forward a no-miracles argument.

==== Newman problem ====
The so-called Newman problem (also Newman's problem, Newman objection, Newman's objection) refers to the critical notice of Russell's The Analysis of Matter (1927) published by Max Newman in 1928. Newman argued that the ESR claim that one can know only the abstract structure of the external world trivializes scientific knowledge. The basis of his argument is the realization that "[a]ny collection of things can be organized so as to have structure W, provided there are the right number of them", where W is an arbitrary structure.

==== Response to the Newman problem ====
John Worrall (2000) advocates a version of ESR augmented by the Ramsey sentence reconstruction of physical theories (a Ramsey sentence aims at rendering propositions containing non-observable theoretical terms clear by substituting them with observable terms). John Worrall and Elie Georges Zahar (2001) claim that Newman's objection applies only if a distinction between observational and theoretical terms is not made.

Ramsey-style epistemic structural realism is distinct from and incompatible with the original Russellian epistemic structural realism (the difference between the two being that Ramsey-style ESR makes an epistemic commitment to Ramsey sentences, while Russellian ESR makes an epistemic commitment to abstract structures, that is, to (second-order) isomorphism classes of the observational structure of the world and not the (first-order) physical structure itself). Ioannis Votsis (2004) claims that Russellian ESR is also impervious to the Newman objection: Newman falsely attributed the trivial claim "there exists a relation with a particular abstract structure" to ESR, while ESR makes the non-trivial claim that there is a unique physical relation that is causally linked with a unique observational relation and the two are isomorphic.

==== Further criticism ====
The traditional scientific realist and notable critic of structural realism Stathis Psillos (1999) remarks that "structural realism is best understood as issuing an epistemic constraint on what can be known and on what scientific theories can reveal." He thinks that ESR faces a number of insurmountable objections. These include among others that ESR's only epistemic commitment is uninterpreted equations which are not by themselves enough to produce predictions and that the "structure versus nature" distinction that ESR appeals to cannot be sustained.

Votsis (2004) replies that the structural realist "does subscribe to interpreted equations, but attempts to distinguish between interpretations that link the terms to observations from those that do not" and he can appeal to the Russellian view that "nature" just means the non-isomorphically specifiable part of entities.

Psillos also defends David Lewis's descriptive-causal theory of reference (according to which the abandoned theoretical terms after a theory change are regarded as successfully referring "after all") and claims that it can adequately deal with referential continuity in conceptual transitions, during which theoretical terms are abandoned, thus rendering ESR redundant.

Votsis (2004) replies that a scientific realist needs not tie the approximate truth of a theory to referential success. Notably, structural realism initially did not dictate any particular theory of reference; however Votsis (2012) proposed a structuralist theory of reference according to which "scientific terms are able to refer to individual objects, i.e. in a term-by-term fashion, but that to fix this reference requires taking into account the relations these objects instantiate" (in this view, structural descriptions serve as reference determiners).

=== Ontic structural realism ===
While ESR claims that only the structure of reality is knowable, ontic structural realism (OSR) goes further to claim that structure is all there is. In this view, reality has no "nature" underlying its observed structure. Rather, reality is fundamentally structural, though variants of OSR disagree on precisely which aspects of structure are primitive. OSR is strongly motivated by modern physics, particularly quantum field theory, which undermines intuitive notions of identifiable objects with intrinsic properties. Some early quantum physicists held this view, including Hermann Weyl (1931), Ernst Cassirer (1936), and Arthur Eddington (1939). Recently, OSR has been called "the most fashionable ontological framework for modern physics".

Max Tegmark takes this concept even further with the mathematical universe hypothesis, which proposes that, if our universe is only a particular structure, then it is no more real than any other structure.

== Definition of structure ==
In mathematical logic, a mathematical structure is a standard concept. A mathematical structure is a set of abstract entities with relations between them. The natural numbers under arithmetic constitute a structure, with relations such as "is evenly divisible by" and "is greater than". Here the relation "is greater than" includes the element (3, 4), but not the element (4, 3). Points in space and the real numbers under Euclidean geometry are another structure, with relations such as "the distance between point P1 and point P2 is real number R1"; equivalently, the "distance" relation includes the element (P1, P2, R1). Other structures include the Riemann space of general relativity and the Hilbert space of quantum mechanics. The entities in a mathematical structure do not have any independent existence outside their participation in relations. Two descriptions of a structure are considered equivalent, and to be describing the same underlying structure, if there is a correspondence between the descriptions that preserves all relations.

Many proponents of structural realism formally or informally ascribe "properties" to the abstract objects; some argue that such properties, while they can perhaps be "shoehorned" into the formalism of relations, should instead be considered distinct from relations.

== Proposed structures ==
In quantum field theory (QFT), traditional proposals for "the most basic known structures" divide into "particle interpretations" such as ascribing reality to the Fock space of particles, and "field interpretations" such as considering the quantum wavefunction to be identical to the underlying reality. Varying interpretations of quantum mechanics provide one complication; another, perhaps minor, complication is that neither fields nor particles are completely localized in standard QFT. A third, less obvious, complication is that "unitarily inequivalent representations" are endemic in QFT; for example, the same patch of spacetime can be represented by a vacuum by an inertial observer, but as a thermal heat bath by an accelerating observer that perceives Unruh radiation, raising the difficult question of whether the vacuum structure or heat bath structure is the real structure, or whether both of these inequivalent structures are separately real. Another example, which does not require the complications of curved spacetime, is that in ferromagnetism, symmetry-breaking analysis results in inequivalent Hilbert spaces. More broadly, QFT's infinite degrees of freedom lead to inequivalent representations in the general case.

In general relativity, scholars often grant a "basic structure" status to the spacetime structure, sometimes via its metric.

== See also ==
- Constructive empiricism, a rival yet related view
- Semantic view of theories, a view often associated with structuralism
- Structural-systematic philosophy, a particular form of structural realism

== Notes ==
- α: Not to be confused with the distinct tradition of French (semiotic) structuralism.
- β: So-called 'pessimistic meta-inductions' about theoretical knowledge have the following basic form: "Proposition p is widely believed by most contemporary experts, but p is like many other hypotheses that were widely believed by experts in the past and are disbelieved by most contemporary experts. We have as much reason to expect p to befall their fate as not, therefore we should at least suspend judgement about p if not actively disbelieve it."
