= John W. N. Watkins =

Philosopher and professor (1924–1999)

John W. N. Watkins DSC
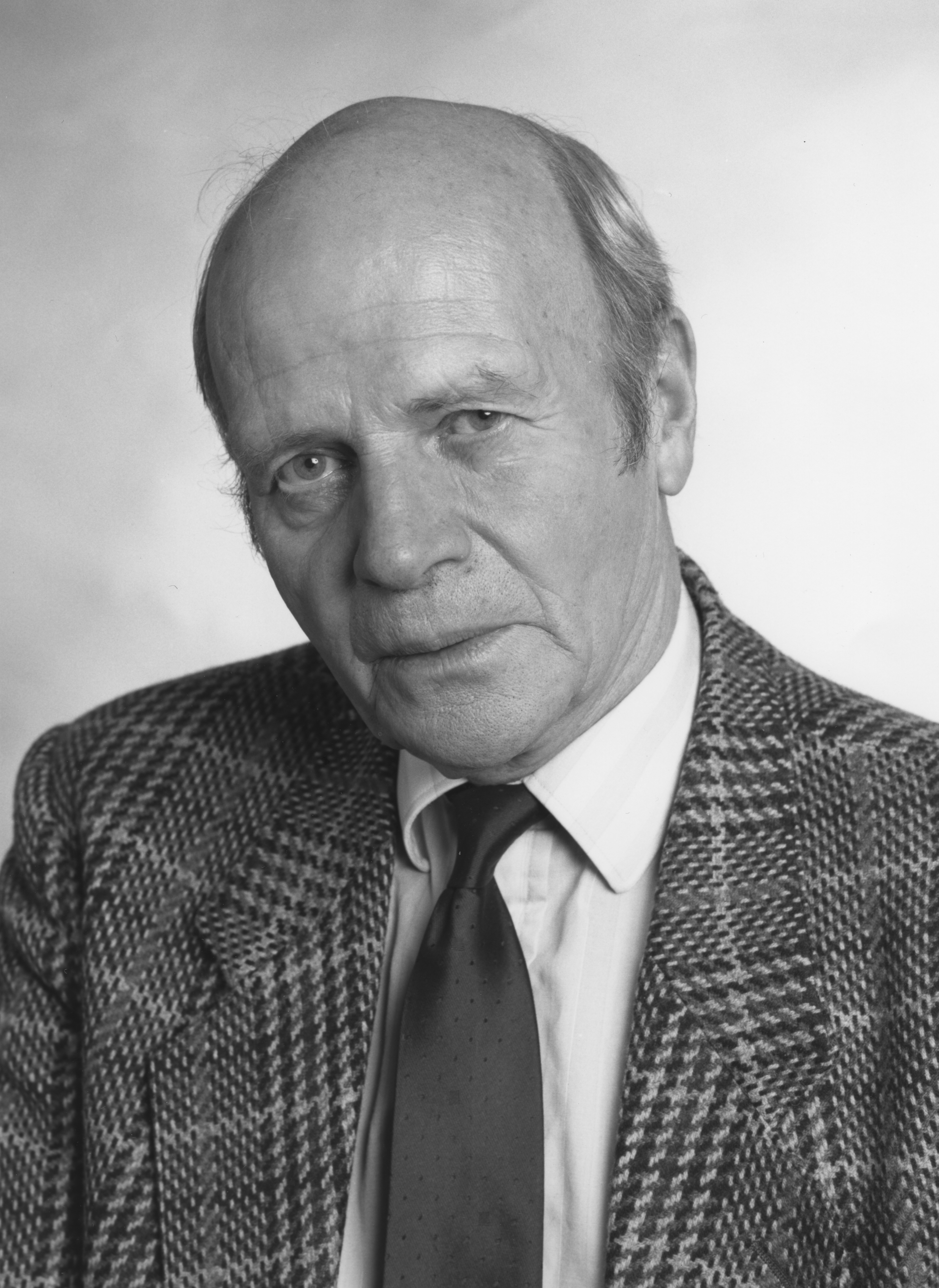
- Watkins in 1985
- Born: John William Nevill Watkins; 31 July 1924; Woking, Surrey, England
- Died: 26 July 1999 (aged 74); Salcombe, Devon, England
- Spouse: Micky Roe (m. 1952)

Education
- Education: Yale University
- Academic advisor: Karl Popper

Philosophical work
- Era: 20th-century philosophy
- Region: Western philosophy
- School: Analytic philosophy
- Institutions: London School of Economics
- Main interests: Philosophy of science; Political science; Metaphysics; Methodological individualism
- Notable ideas: Confirmable and influential metaphysics

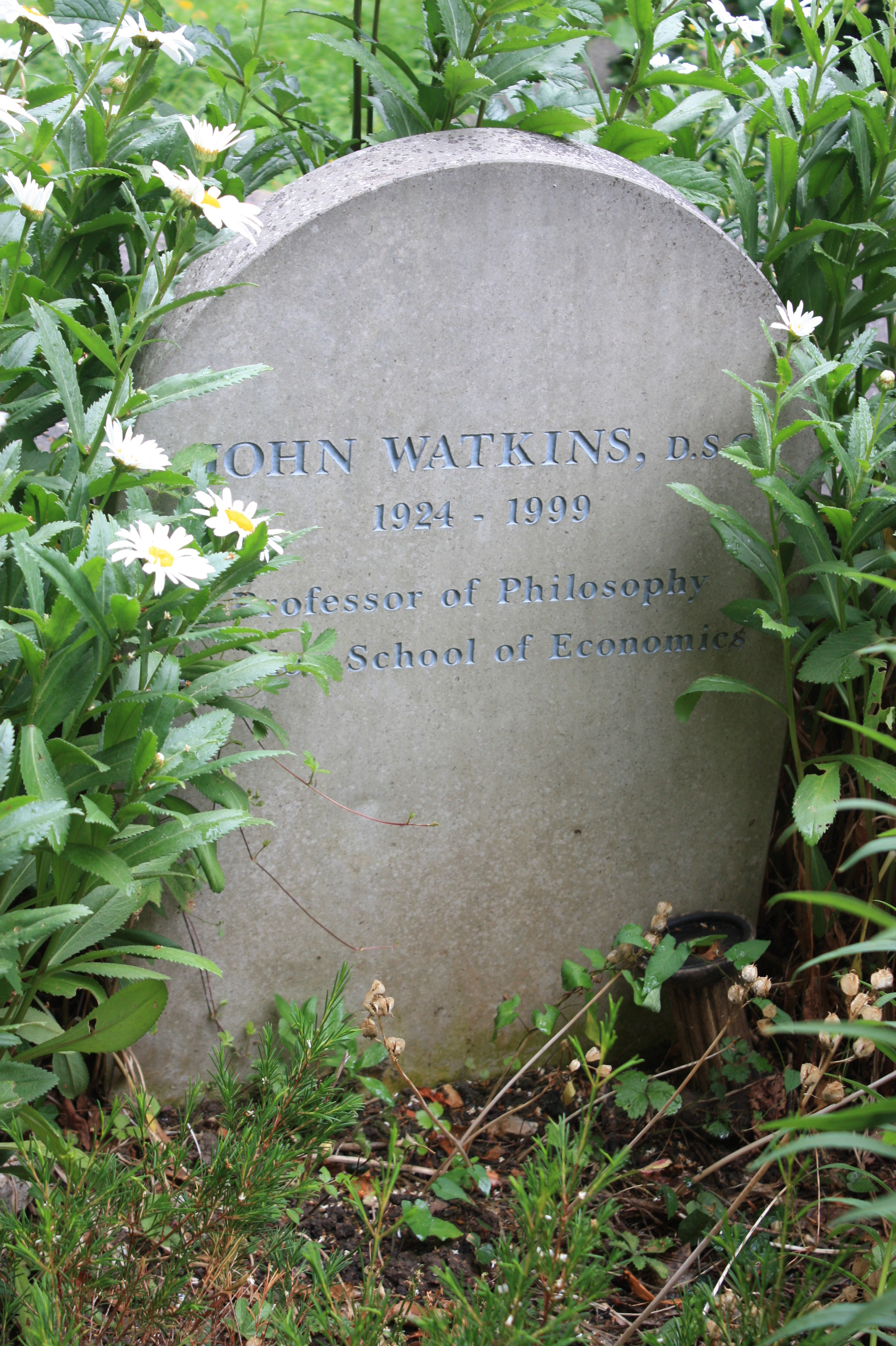
The grave of John Watkins, Highgate Cemetery, London

John William Nevill Watkins (31 July 1924 – 26 July 1999) was an English philosopher, a professor at the London School of Economics from 1966 until his retirement in 1989 and a prominent proponent of critical rationalism.

== Life ==
In 1952, Watkins married Micky Roe, with whom he had one son and three daughters.

== Military service ==
In 1941, aged 17, Watkins passed out in the First Division from the Royal Naval College at Dartmouth and went straight into the wartime Navy. He served in destroyers, escorting Russian convoys and the battleship carrying Churchill back from Marrakesh.

In 1944 he was decorated with the DSC for torpedoing a German destroyer off the French coast, part of an action which defeated the only remaining surface force that might have interfered with the Normandy landings.

== Academic career ==
Reading Friedrich Hayek's The Road to Serfdom (1944) on his destroyer aroused his interest in attending the LSE where Hayek taught. A First in Political Science and a prize-winning essay won him a Henry Ford Fellowship to Yale, where he graduated MA in 1950. Then he returned to the LSE as assistant lecturer in political science.

Watkins had attended Karl Popper's lectures at the LSE in logic and scientific method "and had fallen under his spell". 1958 he shifted from the Government Department to Popper's, being appointed Reader in Philosophy. Imre Lakatos joined them in 1960. Watkins and Lakatos edited the British Journal for the Philosophy of Science, and Watkins was President of the British Society for the Philosophy of Science from 1972 until 1975. When Popper retired in 1970, Watkins took over his chair.

After his retirement in 1989, Watkins played a leading role in establishing the Lakatos Award in the Philosophy of Science as the pre-eminent scholarly distinction in the field, honouring his former colleague Imre Lakatos who had died, aged only 51, in 1974.

On 26 July 1999, eleven weeks after completing his book Human Freedom after Darwin, Watkins died of a heart attack while sailing his boat, Xantippe, on the Salcombe estuary, South Devon, England.

He is buried in the eastern section of Highgate Cemetery not far from the main entrance on the northern path. The John Walkins Plaza was opened in June 2003 at the LSE in front of the library. It was "designed to replicate the open space of a square in an Italian city".

== Philosophical work ==
That metaphysical propositions can influence scientific theorizing is indeed, arguably, Watkins' most lasting contribution to philosophy. He introduced a distinction between confirmable and influential metaphysics. According to Fred D'Agostino:

"[a]s early as 1957, he argued, in 'Epistemology and Politics', that [such a kind of] propositions can have (indirect) implications for normative propositions of ethics and politics. The following year, in 'Confirmable and Influential Metaphysics', he showed the ways in which some untestable and hence, according to Popperian ideas, non-empirical propositions can nevertheless be influential in the development of properly testable and hence scientific theories. These profound results in applied elementary logic...represented an important corrective to positivist teachings about the meaninglessness of metaphysics and of normative claims".

In 1965 Watkins published Hobbes's System of Ideas, in which he argued that Thomas Hobbes's political theory follows from his philosophical ideas.

At an international symposium on Criticism and the Growth of Knowledge held in London in 1965, Watkins replied to a paper in which Thomas S. Kuhn had compared his own theory of scientific revolutions with Popper's falsificationism. He saw a clash between:

"[Kuhn's view of the scientific community] as an essentially closed society, intermittently shaken by collective nervous breakdowns followed by restored mental unison, and Popper's view that the scientific community ought to be, and to a considerable degree actually is, an open society in which no theory, however dominant and successful, no 'paradigm', to use Kuhn's term, is ever sacred."

His most important work was Science and Scepticism, published in 1984. In it he tried "to succeed where Descartes failed", and show how science could survive in the face of scepticism. In his book Human Freedom after Darwin, posthumously published in 1999, he returned to a problem that had long occupied him.

Besides those about the influence of metaphysics on science, Watkins wrote classic and much-anthologised papers about methodological individualism, and about historical explanation.

== Selected bibliography ==
=== Books ===
- Hobbes's System of Ideas: A Study in the Political Significance of Philosophical Theories. London 1965 (Hutchinson); LSE reprint 1989. ISBN 978-0-566-07038-9
- Science and Scepticism. Preface & Contents. Princeton 1984 (Princeton University Press). ISBN 978-0-09-158010-0
- Human Freedom after Darwin: A Critical Rationalist View. London 1999 (Open Court), ISBN 0-8126-9407-4

=== Essays ===
- Lakatos, Imre; Musgrave, Alan, eds. (1970). "Against 'Normal Science' (pp. 25–37)". Criticism and the Growth of Knowledge. London: Cambridge University Press. ISBN 0-5210-9623-5.
- "Ideal Types and Historical Explanation". In Alan Ryan (ed.): The Philosophy of Social Explanation, London 1973 (Oxford University Press), ISBN 0-1987-5025-0, pp. 82–104.
- "Karl Raimund Popper, 1902-1994," Proceedings of the British Academy, 1996, 94, pp. 645-85.
- "The Unity of Popper's Thought". In Paul A. Schilpp (ed.): The Philosophy of Karl Popper, vol. I. La Salle, Illinois 1974 (Open Court), ISBN 0-8754-8141-8, pp. 371–412.

=== Archives ===
- Catalogue of the Watkins papers held at LSE Archives

== See also ==
- Metaphysics § Science
- Rational fideism
