= Semantic anti-realism =

Semantic anti-realism may refer to:

- Semantic anti-realism (epistemology), a position put forward by Michael Dummett
- Semantic anti-realism (philosophy of science), a position criticized by Stathis Psillos
