= John Worrall (philosopher) =

Philosopher (born 1946)

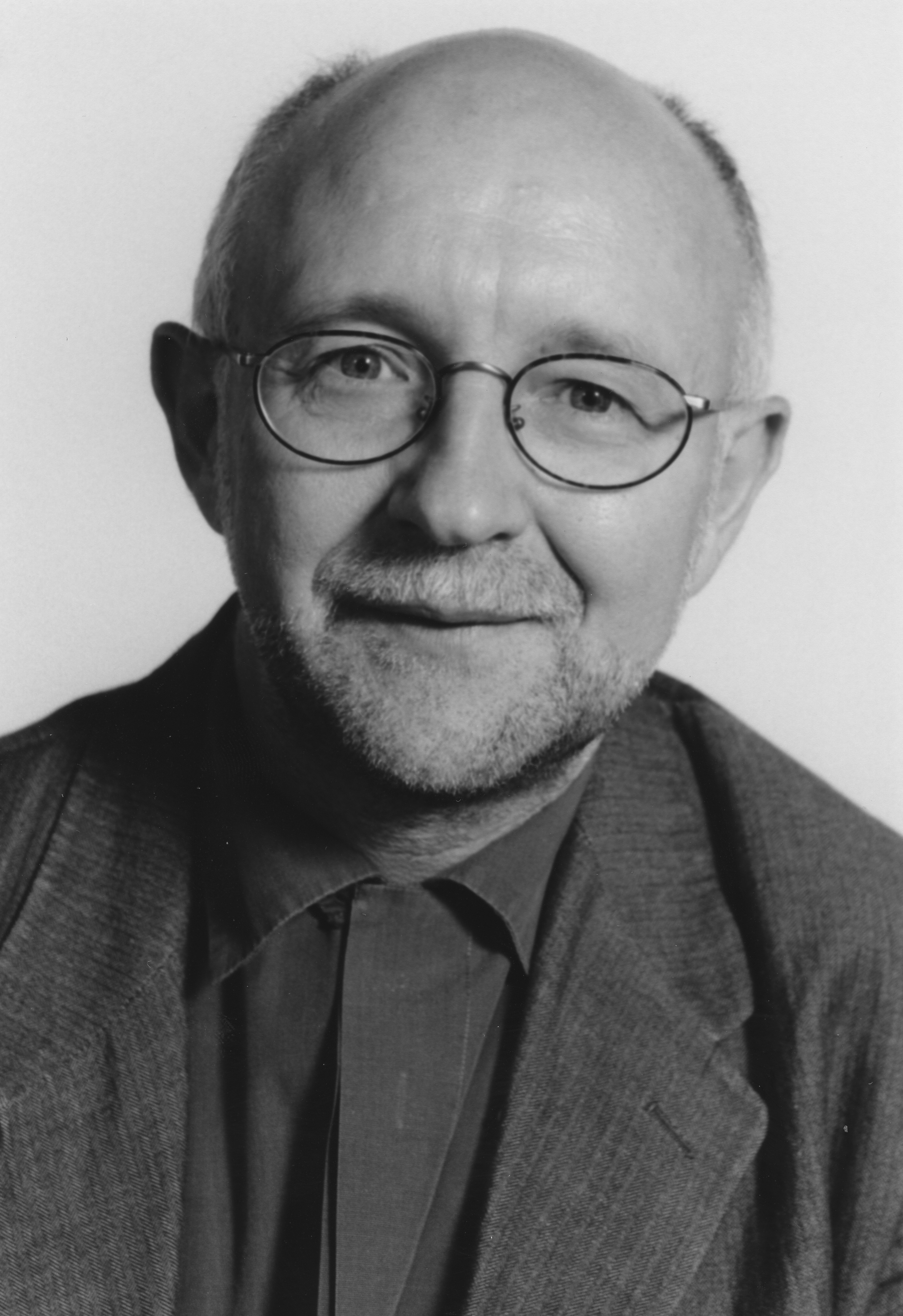
- Worrall, c. 2000
- Born: 27 November 1946 (age 79); Leigh, Lancashire, England

Education
- Education: London School of Economics (BSc, PhD)
- Thesis: The 19th Century Revolution in Optics: A Case Study in the Interaction between Philosophy of Science and History and Sociology of Science (1976)
- Doctoral advisor: Imre Lakatos

Philosophical work
- Era: Contemporary philosophy
- Region: Western philosophy
- School: Analytic philosophy Structural realism
- Institutions: London School of Economics
- Doctoral students: Jeremy Howick
- Main interests: Philosophy of science
- Notable ideas: Ramsey-style epistemic structural realism

John Worrall (/ˈwɒrəl/; born 27 November 1946) is a British philosopher of science. He was a professor of philosophy of science at the London School of Economics until his retirement in 2019, when he became Emeritus Professor. He was also associated with the Centre for Philosophy of Natural and Social Science at the same institution.

== Early life and education ==
Worrall was born, on 27 November 1946, in Leigh, Lancashire (now Greater Manchester). He attended Leigh Grammar School and originally planned to join the school's Scholarship Stream in order to then apply for university admission to Oxbridge. He later described his change of mind, saying: "Think The History Boys – it then meant an additional year in the Sixth Form, and so another year in Leigh and I just couldn't face that!" After receiving a single brief career advice session he instead decided to apply to the London School of Economics "to study mathematical statistics, with a view to being an actuary. (Actuaries apparently having, at any rate then, the highest average salary of all professionals.) So I applied to the LSE for stats, without knowing the first thing about what actuaries do."

As a first year LSE student Worrall elected Alan Musgrave's 'Introduction to Logic' module as his sole optional course unit. This choice included a further optional lecture series, given by Karl Popper, which Worrall also attended, later saying "[…] most of my fellow logic students soon dropped them. But I was hooked". As a consequence of his interest, Worrall changed his undergraduate studies from Statistics to Philosophy. He was the only student in his year to select the Mathematical Logic option, for which the tutor was Imre Lakatos. Worrall later recalled, "He got me all sorts of special permissions to go on studying some maths and stats alongside philosophy. He set me a ferocious list of tasks, including working through [Robert R.] Stoll's Set Theory and Logic and Courant and Robbins' What Is Mathematics?, telling me not to see him again until I had worked through the list. I think he believed he would not see me again. When he did (shortly before Christmas), he branded me a 'hopeful monster' and from then on took a very keen interest in my studies and, later, my early career. Studying his Proofs and Refutations was the intellectual event of my undergraduate study."

== Career ==
Worrall continued to study under Lakatos, advancing the methodology of scientific research programmes through his work in 19th-century optics. He is best known for resurrecting the theory of structural realism in the philosophy of science, a view previously associated with Henri Poincaré. Additionally he has published important work in the philosophy of medicine. He has also published widely in journals and anthologies, edited Imre Lakatos's collected works, and a recent volume on The Ontology of Science. He was editor-in-chief of the British Journal for the Philosophy of Science from 1974 to 1983. He has supervised numerous philosophers including Jeremy Howick, Jeffrey J. Ketland and Ioannis Votsis.

In February 2007, Worrall was one of the guests on BBC Radio 4's In Our Time programme, discussing the theories and legacy of Karl Popper. Worrall discussed Popper's theory of falsification in an episode of A History of Ideas broadcast on BBC Radio 4 on 5 August 2015.

Worrall was the president of the British Society for the Philosophy of Science (BSPS) in 2010–11 and a Vice President of the society in 2014–15.

He retired from the philosophy of science at the London School of Economics in 2019, when he became Emeritus Professor.

== Selected publications ==
- Underdetermination, Realism and Empirical Equivalence, Synthese, Vol 80/2, 2011, pp. 157–172.
- Miracles and Models: Why reports of the death of Structural Realism may be exaggerated, Royal Institute of Philosophy Supplements, Volume 82, Supplement 61, October 2007, pp. 125–154.
- History and Theory-Confirmation in J. Worrall and C. Cheyne (eds.), Rationality and Reality: Conversations with Alan Musgrave. Kluwer Academic Publishers, 2006, pp. 31–61.
- Why Science Discredits Religion in M. Peterson and R. Vanarragon (eds.), Contemporary Debates in Philosophy of Religion. Blackwell, 2004
- Normal Science and Dogmatism, Paradigms and Progress: Kuhn versus Popper and Lakatos in T. Nickles (ed.): Thomas Kuhn. Cambridge University Press, 2003
- What Evidence in Evidence-Based Medicine, Philosophy of Science, September 2002 (with E. Scerri)
- Prediction and the periodic table, Studies in the History and Philosophy of Science Vol 32/3, 2001;
- Kuhn, Bayes and "Theory-Choice": How Revolutionary is Kuhn's Account of Theoretical Change? in R. Nola and H. Sankey (eds.): After Popper, Kuhn and Feyerabend: Recent Issues in Theories of Scientific Method, 2000;
- The Scope, Limits and Distinctiveness of the Method of "Deduction from the Phenomena": Some Lessons from Newton's "Demonstrations" in Optics, The British Journal for the Philosophy of Science, 2000;
- Two Cheers for Naturalised Philosophy of Science, Science and Education, July 1999;
- Structural Realism: the Best of Both Worlds in D. Papineau (ed.), The Philosophy of Science (Oxford 1996).
- Routledge Encyclopaedia of Philosophy (Subject Editor for Philosophy of Science), (Routledge, 1998)
- Philosophy and Natural Science in A. C. Grayling (ed.), Philosophy 2. Further through the subject (Oxford University Press, 1998)
- Revolution in Permanence": Karl Popper on theory-change in science, Karl Popper: Problems and Philosophy (CUP, 1995)
- The Ontology of Science, ed. (Dartmouth Publishing Co, 1994)
