= Lajevardi =

Lajevardi (Persian: لاجوردی) is an Iranian surname. Notable people with the surname include:

- Kaave Lajevardi (born 1971), Iranian philosopher
- Zohreh Lajevardi (fl. 2017), Iranian politician
