= British Journal for the Philosophy of Science =

- Discipline: Philosophy of science
- Language: English
- Edited by: Tim Lewens, Robert Rupert

Publication details
- History: 1950–present
- Publisher: University of Chicago Press
- Frequency: Quarterly
- Impact factor: 3.2 (2023)

Standard abbreviations
- ISO 4: Br. J. Philos. Sci.
- MathSciNet: British J. Philos. Sci.

Indexing
- ISSN: 0007-0882 (print); 1464-3537 (web)
- LCCN: 53020562
- OCLC no.: 01537267

Links
- Journal homepage; Online access; Online archive

British Journal for the Philosophy of Science is a peer-reviewed, academic journal of philosophy, owned by the British Society for the Philosophy of Science and published by University of Chicago Press. The journal publishes work that uses philosophical methods in addressing issues raised in the natural and human sciences.

== Overview ==
The leading international journal in the field, BJPS publishes outstanding new work on a variety of traditional and 'cutting edge' topics, from issues of explanation and realism to the applicability of mathematics, from the metaphysics of science to the nature of models and simulations, as well as foundational issues in the physical, life, and social sciences. Recent topics covered in the journal include the epistemology of measurement, mathematical non-causal explanations, signalling games, the nature of biochemical kinds, and approaches to human cognitive development, among many others. The journal seeks to advance the field by publishing innovative and thought-provoking papers, discussion notes and book reviews that open up new directions or shed new light on well-known issues.

The British Journal for the Philosophy of Science operates a triple-anonymized peer review process and receives over 600 submissions a year. It is fully compliant with the RCUK open access policy, and is a member of the Committee on Publication Ethics (COPE).

In 2016, book reviews were moved to online-only publication in the BJPS Review of Books.

In 2021, the journal launched BJPS Short Reads, essays and a podcast featuring introductions to their published articles.

The journal also runs a blog, Auxiliary Hypotheses.

== Editors-in-chief ==
The current editors-in-chief are Tim Lewens (University of Cambridge) and Robert D. Rupert (University of Colorado Boulder). The following persons have been editors-in-chief:

- Wendy Parker (2017–2024)
- Steven French (2011–2020)
- Michela Massimi (2011–2017)
- Alexander Bird, James Ladyman (2005–2011)
- Peter Clark (1999–2004)
- David Papineau (1993–1998)
- G M K Hunt (1986–1993)
- Donald A. Gillies (1983–1985)
- John Worrall (1980–1981)
- John W. N. Watkins, John Worrall (1974–1979)
- Imre Lakatos (1971–1973)
- David Hugh Mellor (1969–1971)
- Mary Hesse, David Hugh Mellor (1969)
- Mary Hesse (1965–1969)
- John Oulton Wisdom (1956–1964)
- Alistair Cameron Crombie (1950–1955)

== The BJPS Popper Prize ==
The "Sir Karl Popper Essay Prize" was originally established at the wish of the late Laurence B. Briskman (University of Edinburgh), who died on 8 May 2002, having endowed a fund to encourage work in any area falling under the general description of the critical rationalist philosophy of Karl Popper. Briskman was greatly influenced by Popper, who remained the dominant intellectual influence on his philosophical outlook throughout his career. While originally open for submissions, since 2011 the prize is only awarded to papers having appeared in the journal. The endowment ended in 2017, at which point the journal took over funding the prize. The decision was also taken to widen the prize's remit, to include all papers published in the journal and not just those concerned with Popper's work. At the same time, the prize's name was changed to the "BJPS Popper Prize".

== Abstracting and indexing ==
According to the Journal Citation Reports, the journal has a 2023 impact factor of 3.2.
