= Semantic realism =

Semantic realism may refer to:

- Semantic realism (epistemology), a position criticized by Michael Dummett
- Semantic realism (philosophy of science), a position put forward by Stathis Psillos
