= Armin Moczek =

German evolutionary biologist (born 1969)

- Born: 8 July 1969 (age 57); Munich, Germany
- Known for: Mechanisms that facilitate the evolutionary origin of novel, complex traits
- Scientific career
- Fields: Evolutionary biology
- Workplaces: Indiana University Bloomington
- Website: ecoevodevo.comagencyinlivingsystems.com

Armin P. Moczek (born 8 July 1969 in Munich) is a German evolutionary biologist and full professor at Indiana University Bloomington.

== Biography ==
Moczek studied biology at the University of Würzburg, where he graduated in 1996 with a master's degree in zoology. Joining Fred Nijhout’s lab at Duke University he developed a deep interest in Evolutionary developmental biology, receiving his PhD in 2002. From 2002 to 2004 he joined the University of Arizona as a postdoctoral fellow in the Postdoctoral Excellence in Research and Teaching (PERT) program. In 2004, he assumed the position of assistant professor at the Department of Biology at Indiana University, where he was promoted to associate professor in 2009 and full professor in 2014. His research focuses on the genetic, developmental, and ecological mechanisms, and the interactions among them, that facilitate innovation in living systems.

With Sonia E. Sultan and Denis M. Walsh, Moczek co-authored the paper 'Bridging the explanatory gaps: What can we learn from a biological agency perspective?' which was published in BioEssays in 2022.

== Awards ==
- Guggenheim Fellow (2017) Indiana University Bloomington, College of Arts and Sciences, Department of Biology
- Fulbright Distinguished Chair in Science, Technology, and Innovation Award (2017), Fulbright Award, Location: Australia, Indiana University Bloomington
- American Association for the Advancement of Science (2015), American Association for the Advancement of Science, Indiana University Bloomington, College of Arts and Sciences
- American Society of Naturalists (ASN) Young Investigator Prize (2004)
