= Anjan Chakravartty =

Philosophy professor

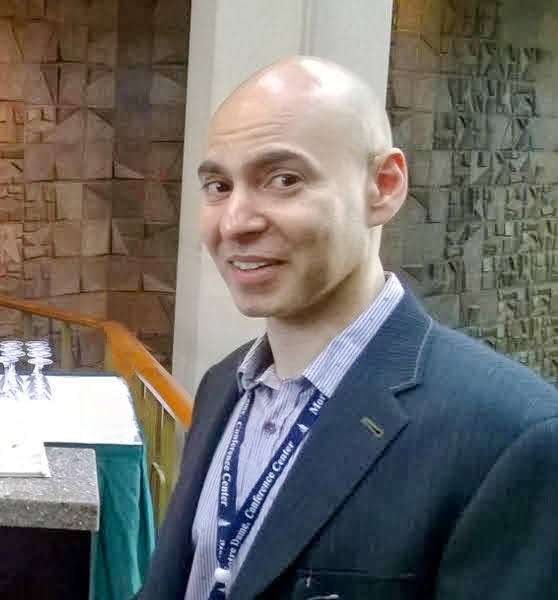

Education
- Education: University of Cambridge (Ph.D.)
- Thesis: Semirealism: the metaphysical foundations of scientific realism (2001)
- Doctoral advisor: Peter Lipton

Philosophical work
- Era: Contemporary philosophy
- Region: Western philosophy
- School: Analytic
- Institutions: University of Toronto, University of Notre Dame, University of Miami
- Doctoral students: Kaave Lajevardi
- Main interests: Philosophy of science, metaphysics, epistemology
- Notable ideas: Semirealism
- Website: https://anjanchakravartty.com/

Anjan Chakravartty is an analytic philosopher and the Appignani Foundation Professor at the University of Miami. Previously, he was a professor of philosophy at the University of Notre Dame and the University of Toronto. His work focuses on topics in the philosophy of science, metaphysics, and epistemology.

== Life ==
After receiving his BSc in Biophysics from the University of Toronto Chakravartty spent three years working for an international development project in Calcutta and a United Nations World Congress on Environment and Development. After receiving an MA in Philosophy from the University of Toronto he spent a year working at the University of British Columbia, and then went on to receive an MPhil and a PhD in History and Philosophy of Science at the University of Cambridge.

On July 1, 2018, he became Appignani Foundation Chair at University of Miami. Prior to this he was the Director of the John J. Reilly Center for Science, Technology, and Values at Notre Dame, and the Editor in Chief of the journal Studies in History and Philosophy of Science.

== Works ==
Books and Collections by Anjan Chakravartty:

• Scientific Ontology: Integrating Naturalized Metaphysics and Voluntarist Epistemology, Oxford University Press (2017)

• Ancient Skepticism, Voluntarism, and Science’, International Journal for the Study of Skepticism (2015)

• Explanation, Inference, Testimony, and Truth: Essays Dedicated to the Memory of Peter Lipton’, Studies in History and Philosophy of Science (ed.) (2010) (in memory of his doctoral supervisor Peter Lipton, Hans Rausing Professor of History and Philosophy of Science at the University of Cambridge.)

• A Metaphysics for Scientific Realism: Knowing the Unobservable, Cambridge University Press (2007) (The book won the Biennial Book Prize of the Canadian Philosophical Association in 2009.)

Recent Publications by Anjan Chakravartty:

• 'Truth and the Sciences', in M. Glanzberg (ed.), The Oxford Handbook of Truth, Oxford University Press (2018)

• ‘What is Scientific Realism?’ (with Bas C. van Fraassen), Spontaneous Generations: A Journal for the History and Philosophy of Science (2018)

• ‘Realism, Antirealism, Epistemic Stances, and Voluntarism’, in J. Saatsi (ed.), The Routledge Handbook of Scientific Realism, Routledge (2018)

• ‘Reflections on New Thinking about Scientific Realism’, Synthese (2017)

• ‘Saving the Scientific Phenomena: What Powers Can and Cannot Do’, in J. D. Jacobs (ed.), Putting Powers to Work, Oxford University Press (2017)

• ‘Scientific Realism’ (version II: revised and updated), in E. N. Zalta (ed.), The Stanford Encyclopedia of Philosophy (2017)

• ‘Case Studies, Selective Realism, and Historical Evidence’, in M. Massimi, J.-W. Romeign, & G. Schurz, EPSA15 Selected Papers, Springer (2017)

== See also ==
- Scientific structuralism
