= The Natural Ontological Attitude =

"The Natural Ontological Attitude" (1984) is the name of a paper published by philosopher Arthur Fine in which he coins the term "natural ontological attitude" (NOA). The paper deals with the philosophy of science. He published a sequel, "And Not Antirealism Either" in the same year, and both papers were later anthologized in the book The Shaky Game (1986).

== Overview ==
Fine published "The Natural Ontological Attitude" in 1984 and a sequel, "And Not Antirealism Either" in the same year. The subject of his papers is the nature and validity of scientific knowledge with the overarching goal of each paper is to get the reader to abandon either realism or antirealism as he understands them. In their place he advocates a "natural ontological attitude" (NOA). Both articles were then republished in 1986 as chapters in Fine's book The Shaky Game, which takes its title from a comment by Einstein that physicists who undermine causality in physics are playing a shaky or risky game.

Fine argues that both realists and anti-realists share a basic "core position" about both everyday things and scientific statements. Realists and antirealists both trust the evidence of their senses that tables, chairs and other people are present before us and in some sense exist. They also trust the substantiated pronouncements of science that protons and electrons exist and have the size, mass and charge science assigns them. To quote Fine about such common ("core") positions: "…it is possible to accept the evidence of one's senses and accept, in the same way [his italics], the confirmed results of science….". Stated another way: "…both realist and antirealist accept the results of scientific investigations as 'true,' on par with more homely [commonplace, everyday] truths."

Fine asks, if everybody, realist and antirealist included, shares a core position about entities that exist and propositions that are true (e.g., F = ma) where do the differences lie? They lie, according to Fine, in the additions that partisans make to the core. Antirealists may add "the pragmatic…[or] instrumentalist…[or] conventionalist conceptions of truth…[or maybe add an overlay of] idealism, constructivism, phenomenalism [or] empiricism." Spelling out what realists add to the core position takes Fine a long paragraph that boils down to simply one charge: "correspondence with the world … claims about reality."

Fine then goes on. "It seems to me that when we contrast the realist and the antirealist in terms of what they each want to add to the core position, a third alternative emerges—and an attractive one at that. It is the core position itself, and all by itself [his italics]." Fine continues, "…at heart, the grip of realism only extends to the homely connection of everyday truths with scientific truths, and that good sense dictates our acceptance of the one on the same basis as our acceptance of the other, then the homely line makes the core position, all by itself, a compelling one...."

Realism itself is unpalatable to Fine because of the realist's desire to connect truths about an entity (say the mass or charge of an electron) to an actual, existing entity (electron). It is permissible to believe in the properties of an electron but not in the electron itself as the bearer of those properties. That is the mistake realists make. Yet Fine admits that the working scientist believes "…in the existence of those entities to which his theories refer." In addition, Fine concedes that practitioners of science are in no need of the goals, interpretations or justifications of science that theorists can provide. And although scientists may discover more and more properties of, or facts about, an entity, Fine insists that we should not confuse successive advances in our knowledge of an entity with closer approximations as to what that entity actually is.

Antirealists also come under criticism. Theorists who define truth in terms of "acceptance" (rational agreement), or behaviorism or empiricism are all "truthmongers" who are seeking some foundation, some rationale, for what they believe. They make the same basic mistake as the realists since they "rely on metaphysical or epistemological hearing aids" to hear the voice of science. Only NOA is immune from these delusions and distractions. Fine concludes And Not Antirealism Either by arguing that truth is a semantical concept and not an ontological or metaphysical concept. He argues that those who wish to ground "truth" in correspondence, empiricism, pragmatism, acceptance, etc. are all making the same fundamental mistake. Embrace NOA he argues and be non-judgmental and heuristic in your pursuit of knowledge. Reject the concept of "truth" as a gold standard to which all knowledge must be compared or evaluated.

== Criticism ==
Since Fine criticizes both realists and antirealists he has come in for criticism from both sides. Many critics could not resist some word play with NOA/NOAH, ark, and "Fine."

Alan Musgrave argues that Fine distorts the varied positions of antirealists especially with regard to their support of the "core." He and others object to the way Fine equates his "core" position with their definition (or anti-definition) of "true."

Robert Klee writes: "NOA seems like obvious inconsistent fence-sitting."

Richard Schlagel writes "I find it utterly implausible that Fine could be serious when he argues that explanatory success could have nothing at all to do with truth."

Stathis Psillos writes "When is the question of theory-acceptance scientifically relevant, and when is it not? Fine refrains from saying, perhaps, because, in the final analysis, it always is relevant."
