= Robert D. Rupert =

American philosopher (born 1964)

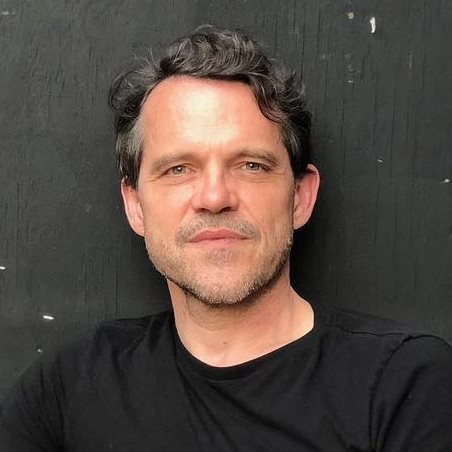
- Born: 1964 (age 61–62); Bozeman, Montana
- Occupations: Academic, researcher, and author

Academic background
- Education: B.A., Philosophy (1987); M.A., Philosophy (1990); Ph.D., Philosophy (1996)
- Alma mater: University of Illinois at Chicago; University of Washington
- Doctoral advisor: Charles Chastain

Robert D. Rupert (born 1964) is an American philosopher. His primary academic appointment is at the University of Colorado at Boulder (UCB), where he is Professor of Philosophy, a fellow of UCB's Institute of Cognitive Science, and a member of UCB's Committee on the History and Philosophy of Science. He is Regular Visiting professor at the University of Edinburgh’s Eidyn Centre and is the co-editor in chief of the British Journal for the Philosophy of Science.

Rupert's research addresses questions in philosophy of mind, philosophy of cognitive science, philosophy of science, metaphysics, and epistemology. He has authored over 50 articles in these areas. His book, Cognitive Systems and the Extended Mind, was published in 2009 by Oxford University Press.

== Education ==
Rupert received his B.A. in Philosophy from University of Washington in Seattle (1987) and his M.A. (1990) and Ph.D. (1996) from the University of Illinois at Chicago. His dissertation was entitled "The Best Test Theory of Extension."

== Career ==
Rupert joined Texas Tech University as a Visiting assistant professor in philosophy in 2000 and, in 2001, became assistant professor of philosophy. He left Texas Tech in 2005 and joined the Philosophy Department at the University of Colorado at Boulder, where he was promoted to associate professor in 2009 and Professor in 2013. From 2013 to 2016, he also held a twenty-percent faculty appointment in the University of Edinburgh's School of Philosophy, Psychology, and Language Sciences.

Rupert has been awarded visiting or research fellowships by the Australian National University, Ruhr University, Bochum, and Western University (Ontario). He has also held visiting positions at the University of Washington, Seattle, and New York University. During academic year 2005–2006, he was a fellow of the National Endowment for the Humanities.

From 2015 to 2020. he served as an Associate Editor of British Journal for the Philosophy of Science (BJPS), becoming Co-Editor-in-Chief of the journal in 2020.

=== Research and work ===
Rupert's early research focused on naturalistic theories of mental content and related questions about concept acquisition. He is the progenitor of the Best Test Theory of Extension, which assigns content to mental representations on the basis of patterns of causal interaction between the developing subject and kinds and properties in the subject's environment. He argued that there is a fundamental overlap between the causal interactions that establish mental content and, at the same time, stabilize and give integrity to the vehicles possessing said content – an idea that he pursued within the frameworks of dynamical systems theory (Synthese 1998) and cognitive neuroscience (Journal of Philosophy 2001).

Rupert has also published papers on a cluster of issues in the metaphysics of mind and philosophy of science, including mental causation, the nature of properties, and the relation between the sciences of the mind and the more fundamental sciences.

The best-known and most influential aspect of Rupert's research focuses on situated cognition, which includes topics related to the extended mind, enactivism, embodiment, and distributed cognition. In 2004, he published "Challenges to the Hypothesis of Extended Cognition." This paper had sizeable impact on the debate about extended mind and extended cognition, as did his more comprehensive treatment of situated cognition in 2009's "Cognitive Systems and the Extended Mind. In the latter, he introduces the Conditional Probability of Co-contribution account of cognitive systems, which specifies what it is for a cluster of mechanisms to be bound together into a single cognitive system (or cognitive self), thereby, he argues, delineating the boundary of genuinely cognitive processing.

Rupert's interest in distributed cognition gave rise to an adjacent research program, on the topic of group minds. In this domain, he has attempted to identify the abstract properties that groups of humans share with individual humans, such that groups might properly be said to have mental or cognitive states of their own. Although his best-known work on this topic (Episteme 2005) takes a skeptical tone, his current efforts in this regard focus on graph-theoretic properties of networks – such as a network's having a small-world architecture – as candidates for such shared properties.

In the area of cognitive systems and nature of cognition, Rupert has argued that the mind is massively representational and that philosophers of mind should set aside their commitment to a metaphysically distinctive personal-level. According to the former proposal, cognitive science should attend to the sheer number of mental representations with the same content that contribute to the production of an action or form of behavior. Rupert's work on the personal level encourages a flattened conception of the mind, according to which the mental states and processes often thought to be at a distinctive level – the level of the whole person – should be treated instead as states and processes sitting right alongside such states and processes as those at work in early visual processing or in the subconscious processes that fluidly determine whether incoming speech makes sense.

In addition, Rupert has an ongoing interest in epistemology, which has produced papers on metaphilosophy, the a priori, and on the role of so-called subpersonal processing in the determination of epistemic value.

== Publications ==
=== Books ===
- Cognitive Systems and the Extended Mind Oxford University Press (2009)

=== Selected articles ===
- "On the Relationship between Naturalistic Semantics and Individuation Criteria for Terms in a Language of Thought," Synthese 117 (1998): 95–131
- "The Best Test Theory of Extension: First Principle(s)," Mind & Language 14 (September 1999): 321–55
- "Coining Terms in the Language of Thought: Innateness, Emergence, and the Lot of Cummins’s Argument against the Causal Theory of Mental Content," Journal of Philosophy 98 (October 2001): 499–530
- "Challenges to the Hypothesis of Extended Cognition," Journal of Philosophy 101 (August 2004): 389–428
- "Minding One’s Cognitive Systems: When Does a Group of Minds Constitute a Single Cognitive Unit?" Episteme: A Journal of Social Epistemology 1 (2005): 177–88*
- "Functionalism, Mental Causation, and the Problem of Metaphysically Necessary Effects," Noûs 40 (June 2006): 256–83
- "Realization, Completers, and Ceteris Paribus Laws in Psychology," British Journal for the Philosophy of Science 58 (2007): 1–11
- "Ceteris Paribus Laws, Component Forces, and the Nature of Special-Science Properties," Noûs 42, 3 (September 2008): 349–80
- "The Causal Theory of Properties and the Causal Theory of Reference, or How to Name Properties and Why It Matters," Philosophy and Phenomenological Research 77, 3 (November 2008): 579–612
- "Cognitive Systems and the Supersized Mind," Philosophical Studies 152 (2011): 427–436
- "Embodiment, Consciousness, and the Massively Representational Mind," Philosophical Topics 39, 1 (2011): 99–120
- "Memory, Natural Kinds, and Cognitive Extension; or, Martians Don’t Remember, and Cognitive Science Is Not about Cognition," Review of Philosophy and Psychology 4, 1 (2013): 25–47
- "Against Group Cognitive States," S. Chant, F. Hindriks, and G. Preyer (eds.), From Individual to Collective Intentionality (Oxford: Oxford University Press, 2014), pp. 97–111
- "Embodiment, Consciousness, and Neurophenomenology: Embodied Cognitive Science Puts the (First) Person in Its Place," Journal of Consciousness Studies 22 (2015): 148–180
- "Embodied Concepts, Conceptual Change, and A Priori Knowledge; or, Justification and the Ways Life Can Go," American Philosophical Quarterly 53, 2 (April, 2016): 169–192
- "Representation and Mental Representation," Philosophical Explorations 21, 2 (2018), 204–225
