= Instrumental and intrinsic value =

Philosophical concept

In moral philosophy, instrumental and intrinsic value are the distinction between what is a means to an end and what is as an end in itself. Things are deemed to have instrumental value (or extrinsic value) if they help one achieve a particular end; intrinsic values, by contrast, are understood to be desirable in and of themselves. A tool or appliance, such as a hammer or washing machine, has instrumental value because it helps one pound in a nail or clean clothes, respectively. Happiness and pleasure are typically considered to have intrinsic value insofar as asking why someone would want them makes little sense: they are desirable for their own sake irrespective of their possible instrumental value. The classic names instrumental and intrinsic were coined by sociologist Max Weber, who spent years studying good meanings people assigned to their actions and beliefs.

The Oxford Handbook of Value Theory provides three modern definitions of intrinsic and instrumental value:

1. They are "the distinction between what is good 'in itself' and what is good 'as a means'."
2. "The concept of intrinsic value has been glossed variously as what is valuable for its own sake, in itself, on its own, in its own right, as an end, or as such. By contrast, extrinsic value has been characterized mainly as what is valuable as a means, or for something else's sake."
3. "Among nonfinal values, instrumental value—intuitively, the value attaching a means to what is finally valuable—stands out as a bona fide example of what is not valuable for its own sake."

When people judge efficient means and legitimate ends at the same time, both can be considered as good. However, when ends are judged separately from means, it may result in a conflict: what works may not be right; what is right may not work. Separating the criteria contaminates reasoning about the good. Philosopher John Dewey argued that separating criteria for good ends from those for good means necessarily contaminates recognition of efficient and legitimate patterns of behavior. Economist J. Fagg Foster explained why only instrumental value is capable of correlating good ends with good means. Philosopher Jacques Ellul argued that instrumental value has become completely contaminated by inhuman technological consequences, and must be subordinated to intrinsic supernatural value. Philosopher Anjan Chakravartty argued that instrumental value is only legitimate when it produces good scientific theories compatible with the intrinsic truth of mind-independent reality.

The word value is ambiguous in that it is both a verb and a noun, as well as denoting both a criterion of judgment itself and the result of applying a criterion. To reduce ambiguity, throughout this article the noun value names a criterion of judgment, as opposed to valuation which is an object that is judged valuable. The plural values identifies collections of valuations, without identifying the criterion applied.

== Immanuel Kant ==
Immanuel Kant is famously quoted as saying:

So act as to treat humanity, whether in thine own person or in that of any other, in every case as an end withal, never as means only.

Here, Kant considers both instrumental and intrinsic value, although not calling them by those names.

The names instrumental and intrinsic were coined by sociologist Max Weber, who spent years studying good meanings people assigned to their actions and beliefs. According to Weber, "[s]ocial action, like all action, may be" judged as:

1. Instrumental rational (zweckrational): action "determined by expectations as to the behavior of objects in the environment of other human beings; these expectations are used as 'conditions' or 'means' for the attainment of the actor's own rationally pursued and calculated ends."
2. Value-rational (wertrational): action "determined by a conscious belief in the value for its own sake of some ethical, aesthetic, religious, or other form of behavior, independently of its prospects of success."

Weber's original definitions also include a comment showing his doubt that conditionally efficient means can achieve unconditionally legitimate ends:

[T]he more the value to which action is oriented is elevated to the status of an absolute [intrinsic] value, the more "irrational" in this [instrumental] sense the corresponding action is. For the more unconditionally the actor devotes himself to this value for its own sake…the less he is influenced by considerations of the [conditional] consequences of his action.

== John Dewey ==
John Dewey thought that belief in intrinsic value was a mistake. Although the application of instrumental value is easily contaminated, it is the only means humans have to coordinate group behaviour efficiently and legitimately.

Every social transaction has good or bad consequences depending on prevailing conditions, which may or may not be satisfied. Continuous reasoning adjusts institutions to keep them working on the right track as conditions change. Changing conditions demand changing judgments to maintain efficient and legitimate correlation of behavior.

For Dewey, "restoring integration and cooperation between man's beliefs about the world in which he lives and his beliefs about the values [valuations] and purposes that should direct his conduct is the deepest problem of modern life." Moreover, a "culture which permits science to destroy traditional values [valuations] but which distrusts its power to create new ones is a culture which is destroying itself."

Dewey agreed with Max Weber that people talk as if they apply instrumental and intrinsic criteria. He also agreed with Weber's observation that intrinsic value is problematic in that it ignores the relationship between context and consequences of beliefs and behaviors. Both men questioned how anything valued intrinsically "for its own sake" can have operationally efficient consequences. However, Dewey rejects the common belief—shared by Weber—that supernatural intrinsic value is necessary to show humans what is permanently "right." He argues that both efficient and legitimate qualities must be discovered in daily life:

Man who lives in a world of hazards…has sought to attain [security] in two ways. One of them began with an attempt to propitiate the [intrinsic] powers which environ him and determine his destiny. It expressed itself in supplication, sacrifice, ceremonial rite and magical cult.… The other course is to invent [instrumental] arts and by their means turn the powers of nature to account.… [F]or over two thousand years, the…most influential and authoritatively orthodox tradition…has been devoted to the problem of a purely cognitive certification (perhaps by revelation, perhaps by intuition, perhaps by reason) of the antecedent immutable reality of truth, beauty, and goodness.… The crisis in contemporary culture, the confusions and conflicts in it, arise from a division of authority. Scientific [instrumental] inquiry seems to tell one thing, and traditional beliefs [intrinsic valuations] about ends and ideals that have authority over conduct tell us something quite different.… As long as the notion persists that knowledge is a disclosure of [intrinsic] reality…prior to and independent of knowing, and that knowing is independent of a purpose to control the quality of experienced objects, the failure of natural science to disclose significant values [valuations] in its objects will come as a shock.

Finding no evidence of "antecedent immutable reality of truth, beauty, and goodness," Dewey argues that both efficient and legitimate goods are discovered in the continuity of human experience:

Dewey's ethics replaces the goal of identifying an ultimate end or supreme principle that can serve as a criterion of ethical evaluation with the goal of identifying a method for improving our value judgments. Dewey argued that ethical inquiry is of a piece with empirical inquiry more generally.… This pragmatic approach requires that we locate the conditions of warrant for our value judgments in human conduct itself, not in any a priori fixed reference point outside of conduct, such as in God's commands, Platonic Forms, pure reason, or "nature," considered as giving humans a fixed telos [intrinsic end].

Philosophers label a "fixed reference point outside of conduct' a "natural kind," and presume it to have eternal existence knowable in itself without being experienced. Natural kinds are intrinsic valuations presumed to be "mind-independent" and "theory-independent."

Dewey grants the existence of "reality" apart from human experience, but denied that it is structured as intrinsically real natural kinds. Instead, he sees reality as functional continuity of ways-of-acting, rather than as interaction among pre-structured intrinsic kinds. Humans may intuit static kinds and qualities, but such private experience cannot warrant inferences or valuations about mind-independent reality. Reports or maps of perceptions or intuitions are never equivalent to territories mapped.

People reason daily about what they ought to do and how they ought to do it. Inductively, they discover sequences of efficient means that achieve consequences. Once an end is reached—a problem solved—reasoning turns to new conditions of means–end relations. Valuations that ignore consequence-determining conditions cannot coordinate behavior to solve real problems; they contaminate rationality.

Value judgments have the form: if one acted in a particular way (or valued this object), then certain consequences would ensue, which would be valued. The difference between an apparent and a real good [means or end], between an unreflectively and a reflectively valued good, is captured by its value [valuation of goodness] not just as immediately experienced in isolation, but in view of its wider consequences and how they are valued.… So viewed, value judgments are tools for discovering how to live a better life, just as scientific hypotheses are tools for uncovering new information about the world.

In brief, Dewey rejects the traditional belief that judging things as good in themselves, apart from existing means–end relations, can be rational. The sole rational criterion is instrumental value. Each valuation is conditional but, cumulatively, all are developmental—and therefore socially-legitimate solutions of problems. Competent instrumental valuations treat the "function of consequences as necessary tests of the validity of propositions, provided these consequences are operationally instituted and are such as to resolve the specific problems evoking the operations."

== J. Fagg Foster ==
John Fagg Foster made John Dewey's rejection of intrinsic value more operational by showing that its competent use rejects the legitimacy of utilitarian ends—satisfaction of whatever ends individuals adopt. It requires recognizing developmental sequences of means and ends.

Utilitarians hold that individual wants cannot be rationally justified; they are intrinsically worthy subjective valuations and cannot be judged instrumentally. This belief supports philosophers who hold that facts ("what is") can serve as instrumental means for achieving ends, but cannot authorize ends ("what ought to be"). This fact–value distinction creates what philosophers label the is-ought problem: wants are intrinsically fact-free, good in themselves; whereas efficient tools are valuation-free, usable for good or bad ends. In modern North American culture, this utilitarian belief supports the libertarian assertion that every individual's intrinsic right to satisfy wants makes it illegitimate for anyone—but especially governments—to tell people what they ought to do.

Foster finds that the is-ought problem is a useful place to attack the irrational separation of good means from good ends. He argues that want-satisfaction ("what ought to be") cannot serve as an intrinsic moral compass because 'wants' are themselves consequences of transient conditions.

[T]he things people want are a function of their social experience, and that is carried on through structural institutions that specify their activities and attitudes. Thus the pattern of people's wants takes visible form partly as a result of the pattern of the institutional structure through which they participate in the economic process. As we have seen, to say that an economic problem exists is to say that part of the particular patterns of human relationships has ceased or failed to provide the effective participation of its members. In so saying, we are necessarily in the position of asserting that the instrumental efficiency of the economic process is the criterion of judgment in terms of which, and only in terms of which, we may resolve economic problems.

Since 'wants' are shaped by social conditions, they must be judged instrumentally; they arise in problematic situations when habitual patterns of behavior fail to maintain instrumental correlations.

=== Examples ===
Foster uses with homely examples to support his thesis that problematic situations ("what is") contain the means for judging legitimate ends ("what ought to be"). Rational efficient means achieve rational developmental ends. Consider the problem all infants face learning to walk. They spontaneously recognize that walking is more efficient differently to crawling—an instrumental valuation of a desirable end. They learn to walk by repeatedly moving and balancing, judging the efficiency with which these means achieve their instrumental goal. When they master this new way-of-acting, they experience great satisfaction, but satisfaction is never their end-in-view.

=== Revised definition of 'instrumental value' ===
To guard against contamination of instrumental value by judging means and ends independently, Foster revised his definition to embrace both.

Instrumental value is the criterion of judgment which seeks instrumentally-efficient means that "work" to achieve developmentally-continuous ends. This definition stresses the condition that instrumental success is never short term; it must not lead down a dead-end street. The same point is made by the currently popular concern for sustainability—a synonym for instrumental value.

Dewey's and Foster's argument that there is no intrinsic alternative to instrumental value continues to be ignored rather than refuted. Scholars continue to accept the possibility and necessity of knowing "what ought to be" independently of transient conditions that determine actual consequences of every action. Jacques Ellul and Anjan Chakravartty were prominent exponents of the truth and reality of intrinsic value as constraint on relativistic instrumental value.

== Jacques Ellul ==
Jacques Ellul made scholarly contributions to many fields, but his American reputation grew out of his criticism of the autonomous authority of instrumental value, the criterion that John Dewey and J. Fagg Foster found to be the core of human rationality. He specifically criticized the valuations central to Dewey's and Foster's thesis: evolving instrumental technology.

His principal work, published in 1954, bore the French title La technique and tackles the problem that Dewey addressed in 1929: a culture in which the authority of evolving technology destroys traditional valuations without creating legitimate new ones. Both men agree that conditionally-efficient valuations ("what is") become irrational when viewed as unconditionally efficient in themselves ("what ought to be"). However, while Dewey argues that contaminated instrumental valuations can be self-correcting, Ellul concludes that technology has become intrinsically destructive. The only escape from this evil is to restore authority to unconditional sacred valuations:

Nothing belongs any longer to the realm of the gods or the supernatural. The individual who lives in the technical milieu knows very well that there is nothing spiritual anywhere. But man cannot live without the [intrinsic] sacred. He therefore transfers his sense of the sacred to the very thing which has destroyed its former object: to technique itself.

The English edition of La technique was published in 1964, titled The Technological Society, and quickly entered ongoing disputes in the United States over the responsibility of instrumental value for destructive social consequences. The translator of Technological Society summarizes Ellul's thesis:

Technological Society is a description of the way in which an autonomous [instrumental] technology is in process of taking over the traditional values [intrinsic valuations] of every society without exception, subverting and suppressing those values to produce at last a monolithic world culture in which all non-technological difference and variety is mere appearance.

Ellul opens The Technological Society by asserting that instrumental efficiency is no longer a conditional criterion. It has become autonomous and absolute:

The term technique, as I use it, does not mean machines, technology, or this or that procedure for attaining an end. In our technological society, technique is the totality of methods rationally arrived at and having absolute efficiency (for a given stage of development) in every field of human activity.

He blames instrumental valuations for destroying intrinsic meanings of human life: "Think of our dehumanized factories, our unsatisfied senses, our working women, our estrangement from nature. Life in such an environment has no meaning." While Weber had labeled the discrediting of intrinsic valuations as disenchantment, Ellul came to label it as "terrorism." He dates its domination to the 1800s, when centuries-old handicraft techniques were massively eliminated by inhuman industry.

When, in the 19th century, society began to elaborate an exclusively rational technique which acknowledged only considerations of efficiency, it was felt that not only the traditions but the deepest instincts of humankind had been violated. Culture is necessarily humanistic or it does not exist at all.… [I]t answers questions about the meaning of life, the possibility of reunion with ultimate being, the attempt to overcome human finitude, and all other questions that they have to ask and handle. But technique cannot deal with such things.… Culture exists only if it raises the question of meaning and values [valuations].… Technique is not at all concerned about the meaning of life, and it rejects any relation to values [intrinsic valuations].

Ellul's core accusation is that instrumental efficiency has become absolute, i.e., a good-in-itself; it wraps societies in a new technological milieu with six intrinsically inhuman characteristics:

1. artificiality;
2. autonomy, "with respect to values [valuations], ideas, and the state;"
3. self-determinative, independent "of all human intervention;"
4. "It grows according to a process which is causal but not directed to [good] ends;"
5. "It is formed by an accumulation of means which have established primacy over ends;"
6. "All its parts are mutually implicated to such a degree that it is impossible to separate them or to settle any technical problems in isolation."

=== Criticism ===
Philosophers Tiles and Oberdiek (1995) find Ellul's characterization of instrumental value inaccurate. They criticize him for anthropomorphizing and demonizing instrumental value. They counter this by examining the moral reasoning of scientists whose work led to nuclear weapons: those scientists demonstrated the capacity of instrumental judgments to provide them with a moral compass to judge nuclear technology; they were morally responsible without intrinsic rules. Tiles and Oberdiek's conclusion coincides with that of Dewey and Foster: instrumental value, when competently applied, is self-correcting and provides humans with a developmental moral compass.

For although we have defended general principles of the moral responsibilities of professional people, it would be foolish and wrongheaded to suggest codified [intrinsic] rules. It would be foolish because concrete cases are more complex and nuanced than any code could capture; it would be wrongheaded because it would suggest that our sense of moral responsibility can be fully captured by a code. In fact, as we have seen in many instances, technology simply allows us to go on doing stupid things in clever ways. The questions that technology cannot solve, although it will always frame and condition the answers, are "What should we be trying to do? What kind of lives should we, as human beings, be seeking to live? And can this kind of life be pursued without exploiting others? But until we can at least propose [instrumental] answers to those questions we cannot really begin to do sensible things in the clever ways that technology might permit.

== Semi-realism (Anjan Chakravartty) ==
Anjan Chakravartty came indirectly to question the autonomous authority of instrumental value. He viewed it as a foil for the currently dominant philosophical school labeled "scientific realism," with which he identifies. In 2007, he published a work defending the ultimate authority of intrinsic valuations to which realists are committed. He links the pragmatic instrumental criterion to discredited anti-realist empiricist schools including logical positivism and instrumentalism.

Chakravartty began his study with rough characterizations of realist and anti-realist valuations of theories. Anti-realists believe "that theories are merely instruments for predicting observable phenomena or systematizing observation reports;" they assert that theories can never report or prescribe truth or reality "in itself." By contrast, scientific realists believe that theories can "correctly describe both observable and unobservable parts of the world." Well-confirmed theories—"what ought to be" as the end of reasoning—are more than tools; they are maps of intrinsic properties of an unobservable and unconditional territory—"what is" as natural-but-metaphysical real kinds.

Chakravartty treats criteria of judgment as ungrounded opinion, but admits that realists apply the instrumental criterion to judge theories that "work." He restricts such criterion's scope, claiming that every instrumental judgment is inductive, heuristic, accidental. Later experience might confirm a singular judgment only if it proves to have universal validity, meaning it possesses "detection properties" of natural kinds. This inference is his fundamental ground for believing in intrinsic value.

He commits modern realists to three metaphysical valuations or intrinsic kinds of knowledge of truth. Competent realists affirm that natural kinds exist in a mind-independent territory possessing 1) meaningful and 2) mappable intrinsic properties.

Ontologically, scientific realism is committed to the existence of a mind-independent world or reality. A realist semantics implies that the theoretical claims [valuations] about this reality have truth values, and should be construed literally.… Finally, the epistemological commitment is to the idea that these theoretical claims give us knowledge of the world. That is, predictively successful (mature, non-ad hoc) theories, taken literally as describing the nature of a mind-independent reality are (approximately) true.

He labels these intrinsic valuations as semi-realist, meaning they are currently the most accurate theoretical descriptions of mind-independent natural kinds. He finds these carefully qualified statements necessary to replace earlier realist claims of intrinsic reality discredited by advancing instrumental valuations. Science has destroyed for many people the supernatural intrinsic value embraced by Weber and Ellul. But Chakravartty defended intrinsic valuations as necessary elements of all science—belief in unobservable continuities. He advances the thesis of semi-realism, according to which well-tested theories are good maps of natural kinds, as confirmed by their instrumental success; their predictive success means they conform to mind-independent, unconditional reality.

Causal properties are the fulcrum of semirealism. Their [intrinsic] relations compose the concrete structures that are the primary subject matters of a tenable scientific realism. They regularly cohere to form interesting units, and these groupings make up the particulars investigated by the sciences and described by scientific theories. Scientific theories describe [intrinsic] causal properties, concrete structures, and particulars such as objects, events, and processes. Semirealism maintains that under certain conditions it is reasonable for realists to believe that the best of these descriptions tell us not merely about things that can be experienced with the unaided senses, but also about some of the unobservable things underlying them.

Chakravartty argues that these semirealist valuations legitimize scientific theorizing about pragmatic kinds. The fact that theoretical kinds are frequently replaced does not mean that mind-independent reality is changing, but simply that theoretical maps are approximating intrinsic reality.

The primary motivation for thinking that there are such things as natural kinds is the idea that carving nature according to its own divisions yields groups of objects that are capable of supporting successful inductive generalizations and prediction. So the story goes, one's recognition of natural categories facilitates these practices, and thus furnishes an excellent explanation for their success. The moral here is that however realists choose to construct particulars out of instances of properties, they do so on the basis of a belief in the [mind-independent] existence of those properties. That is the bedrock of realism. Property instances lend themselves to different forms of packaging [instrumental valuations], but as a feature of scientific description, this does not compromise realism with respect to the relevant [intrinsic] packages.

In sum, Chakravartty argues that contingent instrumental valuations are warranted only as they approximate unchanging intrinsic valuations. Scholars continue to perfect their explanations of intrinsic value, as they deny the developmental continuity of applications of instrumental value.

Abstraction is a process in which only some of the potentially many relevant factors present in [unobservable] reality are represented in a model or description with some aspect of the world, such as the nature or behavior of a specific object or process. ... Pragmatic constraints such as these play a role in shaping how scientific investigations are conducted, and together which and how many potentially relevant factors [intrinsic kinds] are incorporated into models and descriptions during the process of abstraction. The role of pragmatic constraints, however, does not undermine the idea that putative representations of factors composing abstract models can be thought to have counterparts in the [mind-independent] world.

Realist intrinsic value as proposed by Chakravartty, is widely endorsed in modern scientific circles, while the supernatural intrinsic value endorsed by Max Weber and Jacques Ellul maintains its popularity throughout the world. Doubters about the reality of instrumental and intrinsic value are few.

== See also ==
- Consequentialism
- Fact–value distinction
- Instrumentalism
- Instrumental and value rationality
- Instrumental and value-rational action
- Natural kind
- Value (ethics)
- Value theory
- Intrinsic value (disambiguation)
