= Jeremy Howick =

Canadian-UK philosopher of science

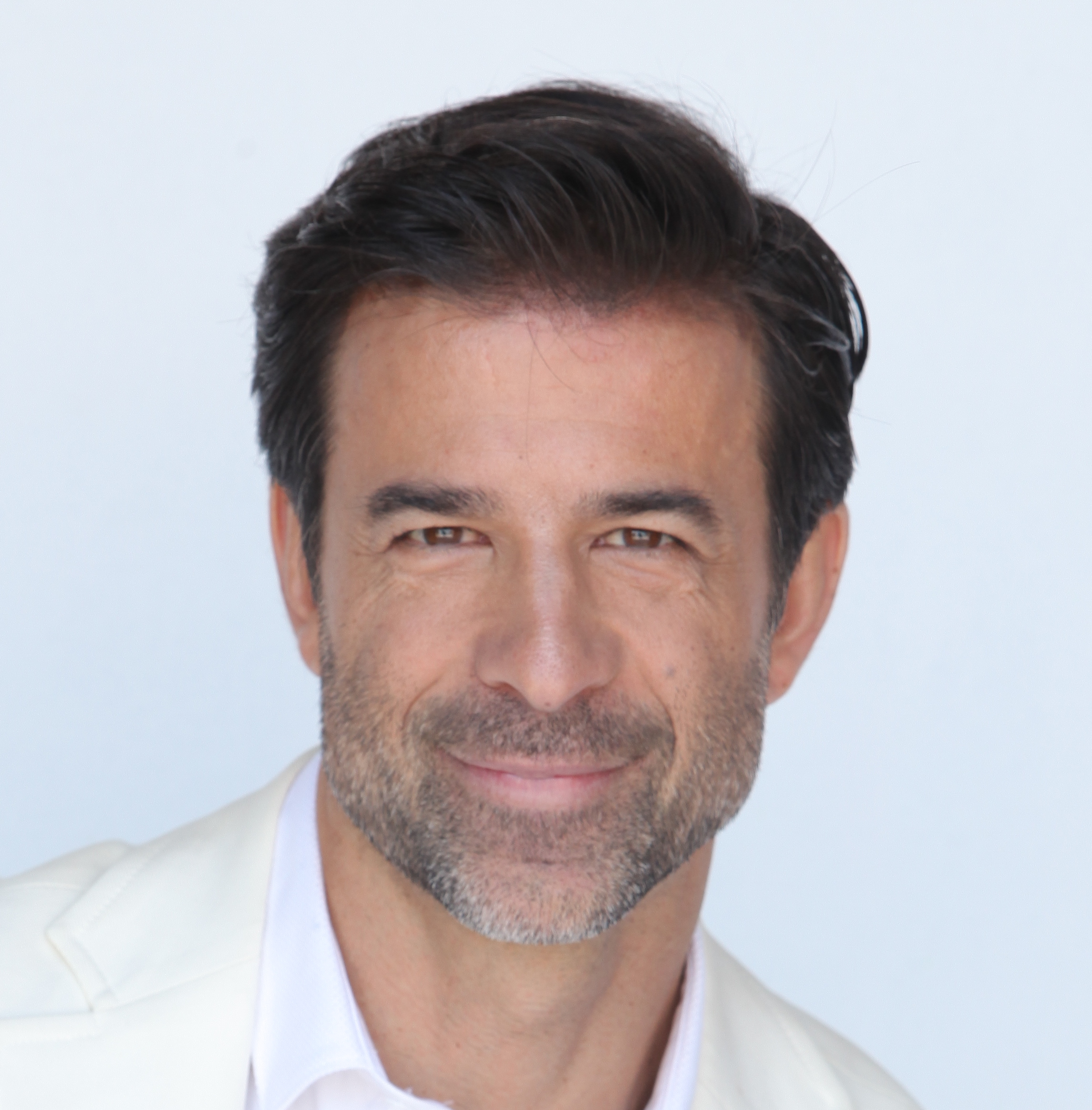
- Born: Montreal, Canada
- Education: Dartmouth College; London School of Economics; University of Oxford
- Occupations: Philosopher, epidemiologist
- Years active: 2009–present
- Known for: Doctor You; The Philosophy of Evidence-Based Medicine
- Medical career
- Profession: Philosopher, clinical epidemiologist, teacher
- Institutions: University of Leicester and University of Oxford
- Sub-specialties: evidence-based medicine, placebo and nocebo effects, empathy in medicine
- Website: www.jeremyhowick.com

Jeremy Howick (/ˈhaʊɪk/) is a Canadian-born, British clinical epidemiologist and philosopher of science.

He is a professor and director of University of Leicester's Stoneygate Centre for Empathic Healthcare. He researches evidence-based medicine, clinical empathy and the philosophy of medicine, including the use of placebos in clinical practice and clinical trials.

In 2016, he received the Dawkins & Strutt grant from the British Medical Association to study pain treatment. He is a member of the Sigma Xi research honours society.

== Early life and education ==
Howick, a native of Montreal, Canada, is a graduate of Westmount High School. He holds a Bachelor of Arts in Engineering from the Dartmouth College, and graduate degrees from The London School of Economics and the University of Oxford. His PhD in Philosophy of medicine at the London School of Economics was conducted under the supervision of Nancy Cartwright and John Worrall, with a thesis entitled Philosophical essentials in evidence-based medicine: Evaluating the epistemological role of double blinding and placebo controls, published in 2008. He is the Director of the Oxford Empathy Programme at the Faculty of Philosophy, University of Oxford.

As a freshman at Dartmouth College, Howick learned to row. He subsequently competed in internationals for Canada at the 1994 World Championships, and won a silver medal at the 1994 Commonwealth Games. He also competed in The Boat Race 1996 representing Oxford.

== Career ==
Howick has worked at the University of Oxford, including at the Centre for Evidence-Based Medicine since 2007. Together with Muir Gray, he founded the Oxford Empathy Programme, and the Oxford Philosophy and Medicine Network. His main post is at the University of Leicester where he is the director of the Stoneygate Centre for Excellence in Empathic Healthcare.

Howick designed a trial of placebo treatments for back pain for a BBC Horizon documentary.

Howick's research combines Philosophy of medicine with medical research (especially Evidence-based medicine. Howick's book, The Philosophy of Evidence-Based Medicine is a critical defense of the Evidence-based medicine Hierarchy of evidence.
