= No true Scotsman =

Logical fallacy

No true Scotsman, or appeal to purity, is a fallacy in which one modifies a prior claim in response to a counterexample by asserting the counterexample is excluded by definition. Rather than admitting error or providing evidence to disprove the counterexample, the original claim is changed by using a non-substantive modifier such as "true", "pure", "genuine", "authentic", "real", or other similar terms.

Philosopher Bradley Dowden explains the fallacy as an "ad hoc rescue" of a refuted generalization attempt. The following is a simplified rendition of the fallacy:

Person A: "No Scotsman puts sugar on his porridge."
Person B: "But my uncle Angus is a Scotsman and he puts sugar on his porridge."
Person A: "But no true Scotsman puts sugar on his porridge."

== Occurrence ==
The "no true Scotsman" fallacy is committed when the arguer satisfies the following conditions:

- not publicly retreating from the initial, falsified a posteriori assertion
- offering a modified assertion that definitionally excludes a targeted unwanted counterexample
- using rhetoric to signal the modification

An appeal to purity is commonly associated with protecting a preferred group. Scottish national pride may be at stake if someone regularly considered to be Scottish commits a heinous crime. To protect people of Scottish heritage from a possible accusation of guilt by association, one may use this fallacy to deny that the group is associated with this undesirable member or action. "No true Scotsman would do something so undesirable"; i.e., the people who would do such a thing are tautologically (definitionally) excluded from being part of our group such that they cannot serve as a counterexample to the group's good nature.

== Origin and philosophy ==
The description of the fallacy in this form is attributed to the English philosopher Antony Flew, who wrote, in his 1966 book God & Philosophy,

In this ungracious move a brash generalization, such as No Scotsmen put sugar on their porridge, when faced with falsifying facts, is transformed while you wait into an impotent tautology: if ostensible Scotsmen put sugar on their porridge, then this is by itself sufficient to prove them not true Scotsmen.

In his 1975 book Thinking About Thinking, Flew wrote:

Imagine some Scottish chauvinist settled down one Sunday morning with his customary copy of The News of the World. He reads the story under the headline, "Sidcup Sex Maniac Strikes Again". Our reader is, as he confidently expected, agreeably shocked: "No Scot would do such a thing!" Yet the very next Sunday he finds in that same favourite source a report of the even more scandalous on-goings of Mr Angus McSporran in Aberdeen. This clearly constitutes a counter example, which definitively falsifies the universal proposition originally put forward. ('Falsifies' here is, of course, simply the opposite of 'verifies'; and it therefore means 'shows to be false'.) Allowing that this is indeed such a counter example, he ought to withdraw; retreating perhaps to a rather weaker claim about most or some. But even an imaginary Scot is, like the rest of us, human; and none of us always does what we ought to do. So what he is in fact saying is: "No true Scotsman would do such a thing!"

David P. Goldman, writing under his pseudonym "Spengler", compared distinguishing between "mature" democracies, which never start wars, and "emerging democracies", which may start them, with the "no true Scotsman" fallacy. Spengler alleges that political scientists have attempted to save the "US academic dogma" that democracies never start wars against other democracies from counterexamples by declaring any democracy which does indeed start a war against another democracy to be flawed, thus maintaining that no true and mature democracy starts a war against a fellow democracy.

== See also ==
- Ad hoc hypothesis
- Begging the question
- Epistemic commitment
- Equivocation
- List of fallacies
- Motte-and-bailey fallacy
- Moving the goalposts
- Persuasive definition
- Reification (fallacy)
- Special pleading
- Whataboutism
