= Stathis Psillos =

Greek philosopher of science (born 1965)

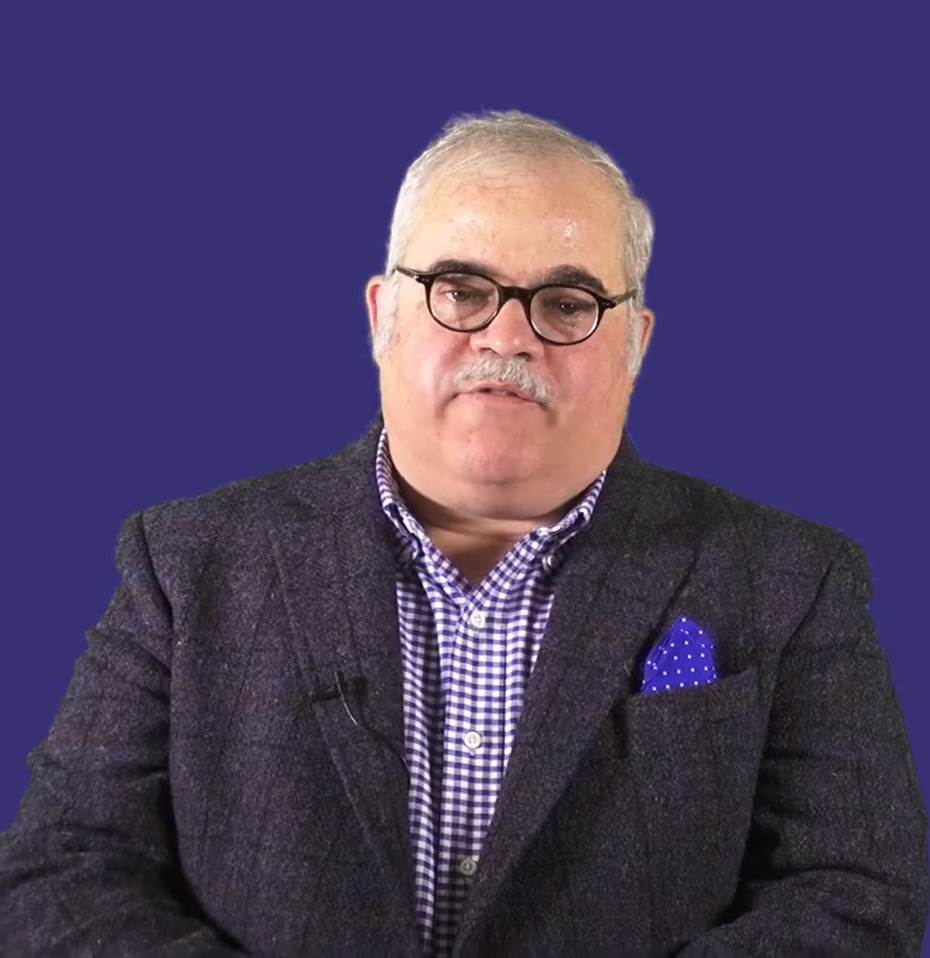
- Psillos in 2016
- Born: Efstathios Psillos; 22 June 1965 (age 60); Athens, Greece

Education
- Education: University of Patras; King's College London (MSc, 1990; PhD, 1994)
- Thesis: Science and Realism: A Naturalistic Investigation into Scientific Enquiry (1994)
- Doctoral advisor: David Papineau

Philosophical work
- Era: Contemporary philosophy
- Region: Western philosophy
- School: Analytic philosophy Scientific realism
- Institutions: University of Western Ontario; University of Athens
- Main interests: Philosophy of science
- Notable ideas: Epistemic optimism Defence of semantic realism about scientific theories and criticism of semantic anti-realism about scientific theories Criticism of the natural ontological attitude Criticism of entity realism Criticism of structural realism

Stathis Psillos (/ˈstɑːθɪs ˈsɪlɒs/; Greek: Ευστάθιος (Στάθης) Ψύλλος; (Note: Greek: [ˈstaθis ˈpsilos]) born 22 June 1965) is a Greek philosopher of science. He is Professor of Philosophy of Science and Metaphysics at the University of Athens, Greece and a member of the Rotman Institute of Philosophy of the University of Western Ontario. In 2013–15, he held the Rotman Canada Research Chair in Philosophy of Science at the University of Western Ontario, Canada.

In 2015, he was classified among the 91 most cited living philosophers with public Google Scholar pages.

== Biography ==
Efstathios Psillos was born in Athens, Greece. He studied physics at the University of Patras, Greece. Having obtained a state scholarship to study philosophy abroad, Psillos went on to King's College London to study for an MSc in History and Philosophy of Science. Under the supervision of David Papineau he obtained a PhD in Philosophy in 1994 from King's College London with a thesis titled Science and Realism: A Naturalistic Investigation into Scientific Enquiry. The examiners were John Worrall and William Newton-Smith.

Between 1993 and 1998 he was initially assistant editor and subsequently deputy editor of the British Journal for the Philosophy of Science. Between 1995 and 1998, he was a British Academy Post-Doctoral Fellow, at the Dept. of Philosophy, Logic and Scientific Method, London School of Economics. Since 1998, he has been a Research Associate of the Centre for the Philosophy of the Natural and Social Sciences, London School of Economics.

He joined the Department of Philosophy and History of Science at the University of Athens, Greece, in 1999. Psillos was among the founders of the European Philosophy of Science Association and served as its first elected President (2007–2009). In the midst of the Greek socio-economic crisis he organised the 3rd congress of the European Philosophy of Science Association, in Athens, in October 2011. From 2009 to 2014, he was the editor of the journal Metascience. In 2008, Psillos was elected member of l’Academie Internationale de Philosophie des Sciences (AIPS). In 2007, he was co-chair of the Programme Committee for the Philosophy of Science for the World Congress of Philosophy, which took place in Seoul, South Korea, in July 2008. In July 2011, he was the Springer Lecturer, at the 11th International IHPST Conference, held at the University of Thessaloniki. In July 2012 he was William Evans Visiting Professor at the University of Otago, New Zealand. In March–May 2013, he delivered the Cardinal Mercier lectures in Philosophy at the Université catholique de Louvain, in Belgium. In 2015, he was elected member of Academia Europaea (Academy of Europe) for his contribution to promoting learning, education and research.

Psillos is the author and editor of 8 books (two of which have been award-winning) and over 120 papers and reviews in learned journals and edited books, mainly on scientific realism, causation, explanation and the history of philosophy of science. He has delivered more than 150 talks in seminars and conferences around the world.

== Philosophical work ==
Psillos is best known for his work in scientific realism and the metaphysics of science. He is a notable defender of semantic realism about scientific theories (the view that theoretical assertions are no less meaningful than observational ones) and also a notable critic of semantic anti-realism about scientific theories (the view that theoretical terms of past scientific theories often fail to refer to anything) and structural realism.

Psillos defends David Lewis's descriptive-causal theory of reference.

== Works ==
- Scientific Realism: How Science Tracks Truth, Routledge, 1999.
- Causation and Explanation, Acumen (2002) & McGill-Queens University Press (2003) [Prize of the Presidents of the British Society for the Philosophy of Science for the best textbook in the Philosophy of Science].
- Logic: The Structure of Argument (with Demetris Portides and D A Anapolitanos), Nefeli, 2007 (in Greek).
- Philosophy of Science A-Z, Edinburgh University Press, 2007.
- The Routledge Companion to the Philosophy of Science (with Martin Curd), Routledge, 2008 [Choice Outstanding Academic Title for 2008].
- Science and Truth, Okto Publishers 2008 (in Greek).
- Knowing the Structure of Nature: Essays on Realism and Explanation, Macmillan-Palgrave, 2009.
- The Routledge Companion to the Philosophy of Science (with Martin Curd), Second Revised and Expanded Edition, Routledge, 2013.
