= Michael Redhead =

British academic (1929–2020)

Michael Redhead FBA
- Born: Michael Logan Gonne Redhead; 30 December 1929
- Died: 31 August 2020 (aged 90)

Education
- Education: Westminster School; University College London (PhD, 1970)
- Thesis: The Quantum Theory of Electron-Electron and Positron-Electron Collisions (1970)
- Doctoral advisor: Leonardo Castillejo

Philosophical work
- Era: Contemporary philosophy
- Region: Western philosophy
- School: Analytic; Scientific structuralism
- Institutions: Wolfson College, Cambridge; King's College London
- Doctoral students: Steven French
- Main interests: Metaphysics; Philosophy of physics
- Notable ideas: Experimental metaphysics

Michael Logan Gonne Redhead FBA (30 December 1929 – 31 August 2020) was a British academic and philosopher of physics.

== Biography ==
Redhead was born on 30 December 1929 in London and educated there at Westminster School.

Redhead was Centennial Professor in CPNSS (Centre for Philosophy of Natural and Social Science) at the London School of Economics and Political Science.

Redhead was an Emeritus Fellow of Wolfson College, Cambridge, and was Vice-President (1992–1996) and Acting President 1992 and 1993, Wolfson College, and formerly Head, CU Dept of History and Philosophy of Science.

He died on 31 August 2020 at the age of 90.
