= Intrinsic value =

Intrinsic value may refer to:

== Economics, finance, numismatics ==
- Intrinsic value (finance), of an option or stock
- Intrinsic theory of value, an economic theory of worth

== Ethics and philosophy ==
- Intrinsic value (ethics), in ethics and philosophy
- Intrinsic value (animal ethics), in philosophy
- Intrinsic value (axiology)

== See also ==
- Instrumental and intrinsic value
- Value (disambiguation)
