= James Ladyman =

British Philosopher of Science

James Ladyman (born 1969) is a British philosopher of science and professor of philosophy at the University of Bristol.

He is a current Associate Editor of Elsevier's Studies in History and Philosophy of Science, having been an Editor-in-Chief of Studies in History and Philosophy of Science Part B: Studies in History and Philosophy of Modern Physics until it was retired as a separate journal in 2021. He has previously served as President of the British Society for the Philosophy of Science, and past Editor of the British Journal for the Philosophy of Science. He is best known for his work on structural realism, and especially ontic structural realism. He has published multiple books, including Understanding Philosophy of Science (2002), Every Thing Must Go: Metaphysics Naturalised with Don Ross (2007), Materialism: A Philosophical Enquiry with Robin Gordon Brown (2019), and What is a Complex System with Karoline Wiesner (2022).

He completed his doctorate under Steven French.
