= Arthur Fine =

American philosopher

- Born: Arthur Isadore Fine; November 11, 1937 (age 89); Lowell, Massachusetts, U.S.

Education
- Education: University of Chicago
- Doctoral advisor: Henry Mehlberg
- Other advisor: Karl Menger

Philosophical work
- Era: 20th-century philosophy
- Region: Western philosophy
- School: Analytic
- Institutions: University of Washington
- Main interests: Philosophy of science · interpretations of quantum mechanics
- Notable ideas: Natural ontological attitude, Fine's theorem

Arthur Isadore Fine (born November 11, 1937) is an American philosopher of science who is professor emeritus of philosophy at the University of Washington. He is known for Fine's theorem in quantum information.

== Education and career ==
Having studied physics, philosophy, and mathematics, Fine graduated from the University of Chicago in 1958 with a Bachelor of Science in mathematics. He then, in 1960, earned a Master of Science in mathematics from the Illinois Institute of Technology with a thesis supervised by Karl Menger.

Fine earned his Ph.D. from the University of Chicago in 1963 under the direction of Henry Mehlberg. Before moving to the University of Washington, Fine taught for many years at Northwestern University and, before that, at Cornell University and the University of Illinois at Chicago. He is a past president of the American Philosophical Association and the Philosophy of Science Association, and has for many years been on the editorial board of the journal Philosophy of Science, one of the leading publications in the field.

In 2014, Fine was elected a Fellow of the American Academy of Arts & Sciences.

== Philosophical work ==
Fine famously proposed the natural ontological attitude (NOA) as a resolution to the debates over scientific realism. This philosophy takes on a neutral stance of realist and antirealist attitudes of acceptance in the industry's best theories, and calls out mistakes across existing theories.

Fine also developed one of the possible interpretations of quantum mechanics yet to be decided between and has contributed to the probabilistic understanding of Bell's theorem.

In 2001, Fine gave the following re-counting of the birth of NOA and its important relationship to Bas van Fraassen's antirealism:

The Scientific Image arrived in 1980 like a breath of fresh air. Although in the introduction van Fraassen counts me among the realist foot soldiers, at just that time Micky Forbes and I were engaged in rethinking the whole realism/antirealism issue. The result was NOA. Van Fraassen's powerful and enlightening monograph encouraged us in that project. If Micky and I are parents of NOA, then Bas is perhaps a godfather. Paul Teller too, since he was among the people then who helped us refine our ideas as they developed.

== Selected publications ==
- Fine, Arthur (February 25, 2009). The Shaky Game: Einstein, Realism, and the Quantum Theory. University of Chicago Press. ISBN 978-0-226-92326-0. 1st edition, 1986; xi+186 pages
- Fine, Arthur; Leplin, Jarrett, eds. (December 1989). PSA 1988: Proceedings of the Biennial Meeting of the Philosophy of Science Association, Vol. 2: Symposia and Invited Papers, held on January 1, 1988. Philosophy of Science Association. ISBN 091758628X; hbk, 517 pages
- Cushing, J. T.; Fine, Arthur; Goldstein, S., eds. (September 30, 1996). Bohmian Mechanics and Quantum Theory: An Appraisal. Springer. ISBN 978-0-7923-4028-7.

== See also ==
- American philosophy
