= Martin Curd =

American philosopher

Education
- Education: Cambridge University (BA), University of Pittsburgh (PhD)

Philosophical work
- Era: 21st-century philosophy
- Region: Western philosophy
- Institutions: Purdue University
- Main interests: philosophy of science

Martin Curd is an American philosopher and associate professor of philosophy at Purdue University. Curd is known for his works on philosophy of science.

== Books ==
- Professional Responsibility for Harmful Actions, Martin Curd and Larry May. (Kendall/Hunt Publishing Company, Dubuque, Iowa, 1984)
- Principles of Reasoning, Martin Curd and Lilly-Marlene Russow. (New York: St. Martin's Press, 1989)
- Argument and Analysis: An Introduction to Philosophy (St. Paul, MN: West, 1992)
- Philosophy of Science: The Central Issues, 2nd edition, Martin Curd, Jan Cover, and Chris Pincock, eds. (New York: W. W. Norton, 2012)
- The Routledge Companion to Philosophy of Science, 2nd edition, Martin Curd and Stathis Psillos, eds. (London: Routledge, 2013)
