= Ronald Giere =

American philosopher (1938–2020)

Ronald Giere (/ˈɡɪəri/; 29 November 1938, Cleveland, Ohio – 20 May 2020) was an American philosopher of science who was an emeritus professor of philosophy at the University of Minnesota. He was a Fellow of The AAAS, a long-time member of the editorial board of the journal Philosophy of Science, and a past president of the Philosophy of Science Association. His research focused on agent-based accounts of models and scientific representation, and on connections between naturalism and secularism.

== Education ==
Giere received a A.B. magna cum laude in physics from Oberlin College in 1960, a master of science in physics from Cornell University in 1963, and a Ph.D. in philosophy from Cornell University in 1968.

== Philosophical work ==
In his book Scientific Perspectivism he developed a version of perspectival realism in which he argued that scientific descriptions are somewhat like colours, in that they capture only selected aspects of reality, and those aspects are not bits of the world seen as they are in themselves, but bits of the world seen from a distinctive human perspective. In addition to the color example, Giere articulates his perspectivism by appeal to maps and to his own earlier and influential work on scientific models. Maps represent the world, but the representations they provide are conventional, affected by interest, and never fully accurate or complete. Similarly, scientific models are idealized structures that represent the world from particular and limited points of view. According to Giere, what goes for colors, maps, and models goes generally: science is perspectival through and through.

Giere was on the faculty of the Department of History and Philosophy of Science at Indiana University Bloomington from 1966 until 1987.

== Publications ==
In addition to many papers in the philosophy of science, he was the author of the following books:

- Understanding Scientific Reasoning (1979; 5th edition, Thomson/Wadsworth, 2006)
- Explaining Science: A Cognitive Approach (University of Chicago Press, 1988)
- Science Without Laws (University of Chicago Press, 1999)
- Scientific Perspectivism (University of Chicago Press, 2006)

He also edited several volumes of papers in the philosophy of science, including, most recently, Cognitive Models of Science (University of Minnesota Press, 1992) and Origins of Logical Empiricism (University of Minnesota Press, 1996).

== See also ==
- Scientific structuralism
