= Kazem Sadegh-Zadeh =

German-Iranian philosopher of medicine

- Born: 23 April 1942; Tabriz, Iran
- Died: 6 March 2023 (aged 80)

Education
- Education: University of Münster; Free University of Berlin; University of Göttingen

Philosophical work
- Era: Philosophy of medicine
- Region: Western science and philosophy
- School: Analytic philosophy of medicine
- Main interests: Logic, methodology, and philosophy of medicine; epistemology, applied fuzzy logic
- Notable ideas: Computability of clinical decision-making, fuzzification of set-theoretical predicates, biopolymers represented as fuzzy sequences of numbers, medicine as a deontic field, scientific knowledge as industrial product

Kazem Sadegh-Zadeh (/ˈzɑːdeɪ/; Persian: کاظم صادق‌زاده; 23 April 1942 – 6 March 2023) was a German analytic philosopher of medicine of Iranian descent. He was the first ever professor of philosophy of medicine at a German university and has made significant contributions to the philosophy, methodology, and logic of medicine since 1970.

== Life and career ==
Sadegh-Zadeh was born on 23 April 1942 in Tabriz, Iran. The fourth of eight children, he grew up in Tabriz and attended school from 1947 to 1959. His father was a craftsman and manufacturer and ran a minor terrycloth weaving mill. In the wake of severe political and economic crisis in the country caused by the U.S. and British coup d'état against the democratically elected government of Iran's Prime Minister Mohammad Mosaddegh in 1953, he went bankrupt and never recovered. At eleven years of age when entering the high school shortly after his father's bankruptcy, Sadegh-Zadeh told his parents he would become a professor of medicine in the future and provoked laughter from them. Upon finishing school education at the prestigious Ferdowsi High School in Tabriz, Sadegh-Zadeh came to Germany in March 1960 to pursue his goal as a working student and studied medicine and philosophy at the universities of Münster, Berlin, and Göttingen from 1960 to 1971 with Internship and residency 1967–1971. He earned a doctorate of medicine, Dr. med., from the University of Göttingen in November 1971. But after these five years of doing practical medicine he left clinical practice to conduct theoretical research on clinical theory and reasoning, for during his work in the hospital he had got the impression that in the foundations of clinical decision-making something was going wrong to produce about 38% errors of diagnosis and treatment. In an autodidactic way he specialized in the philosophy of medicine and was assistant professor and lecturer 1972–1982 and full professor of philosophy of medicine 1982–2004 at the University of Münster located in the city of Münster in the state of North Rhine-Westphalia in northwest Germany. He was married since 1970 and has two sons.

Sadegh-Zadeh was the founder of analytic philosophy of medicine. He inaugurated this new direction in the philosophy of medicine, which he based, like analytic philosophy, on the application of formal logic to distinguish it from the traditional philosophy of medicine for he did not consider this latter, traditional style of philosophizing on medicine a scientific endeavor, but "belles lettres". His international recognition came especially through his work on the logic and methodology of clinical reasoning, including artificial intelligence and fuzzy logic application in the theory of medical decision-making, in the theory of medical knowledge and in medical ethics. He was the founding editor of two international journals, first Metamed founded in 1977 (renamed Metamedicine later. Current title: Theoretical Medicine and Bioethics, published by Springer Verlag), and second, Artificial Intelligence in Medicine founded in 1989 (published by Elsevier). His extensive work includes the following innovative theories: a comprehensive theory of medicine presented in his monumental Handbook, theory of fuzzy biopolymers, the prototype resemblance theory of disease, the palimpsest theory of mind, and the theory of technoevolution and Machina sapiens.

== Work ==
=== Analytic philosophy of medicine ===
Sadegh-Zadeh conceived analytic philosophy of medicine as philosophy of medicine in the analytic tradition of philosophizing, i.e., philosophy of medicine by means of logical and conceptual analysis with its primary fields of inquiry being:

- Philosophy of medical language,
- Medical praxiology, i.e., philosophy, methodology and logic of medical practice,
- Medical epistemology,
- Medical deontics, i.e., analysis of medical morality, obligations, and law,
- Medical logic, and
- Medical metaphysics.

==== Philosophy of medical language ====
Sadegh-Zadeh considered medical language an ill-structured and ill-kept extension of everyday language by adding technical terms such as "angina pectoris", "appendicitis", etc. Sadegh-Zadeh claims that most of its terms are imprecise and ambiguous because they are either undefined or ill-defined. Since it has a significant impact both on medical knowledge and medical decision-making, he devotes himself extensively to the analysis of its nature and of its syntax, semantics, and pragmatics. He demonstrates and analyzes what he claims to be the inherent vagueness of medical terms and constructs techniques for dealing with this principally ineliminable feature by means of fuzzy logic. To this end, he introduces a comprehensive methodology of medical, including fuzzy, concept formation. Inspired by Patrick Suppes's and Carl Gustav Hempel's works, he bases this methodology on an explication and formalization of all methods of definition known today.

==== Medical praxiology ====
Medical, or clinical, praxiology is an old term introduced by Sadegh-Zadeh in 1977–1981 already to denote a wide-ranging inquiry into the foundations of clinical practice, particularly of clinical judgment and decision-making, with the aim of reducing diagnostic-therapeutic errors and of improving physician performance. In the latter article referred to, he has defined the term explicitly as "analysis of clinical practice", "inquiry into clinical practice", and "theory of clinical practice", i.e., the philosophy, methodology, and logic of medical doing and acting. Central topics include everything related to concepts and theories that are basic to clinical practice, i.e., the concepts and theories of patient, suffering, health, illness, disease, diagnosis, etiology, prognosis, therapy, and prevention. This perspective, Sadegh-Zadeh claims, creates a fertile scientific field with a host of tasks ranging from conceptual analyses (like "what is disease?", "what is a diagnosis?", "what is differential diagnosis?", etc.) to logical analyses – such as "is clinical decision-making computable or does it require human intelligence and intuition?" – to epistemology, ethics, and metaphysics of clinical decision-making and so forth. Over the past decades, Sadegh-Zadeh's clinical praxiology has developed further with increasing sophistication. One example of his theories is the prototype resemblance theory of disease presenting a fuzzy-logical explication of the vague concept of disease:

It demonstrates what it means to say that the concept of disease is a non-classical one and, therefore, not amenable to traditional methods of inquiry. The theory undertakes a reconstruction of disease as a category that in contradistinction to traditional views is not based on a set of common features of its members, that is individual diseases, but on a few best examples of the category, called its prototypes, and a similarity relationship such that a human condition is considered a disease if it resembles a prototype. It enables new approaches to resolving many of the stubborn problems associated with the concept of disease.

==== Medical epistemology ====
Medical epistemology is the philosophy of medical knowledge or simply theory of medical knowledge. Sadegh-Zadeh conceived it as a task or branch of the philosophy of medicine already in 1982 deploring that "The contemporary philosophy of medicine movement is mainly concerned with medical-ethical problems while unduly neglecting medical-epistemological ones".

The category medical knowledge consists of statements of spatio-temporally localized facts, general hypotheses, and theories. Sadegh-Zadeh has proposed an elaborate systematics of all types of medical hypotheses and knowledge the latter ones including classificatory knowledge, causal knowledge, experimental knowledge, theoretical knowledge, practical knowledge, clinical knowledge, and medical metaknowledge. Most important among them is what is called practical knowledge or know-how in medicine. By a formally precise explication of this knowledge type he shows that medical-practical knowledge actually consists of conditional norms, i.e., deontic conditionals, mainly conditional obligations. This is one of the reasons why Sadegh-Zadeh considers medicine a deontic discipline. Specifically, he views clinical practice as practiced morality because clinical decision-making is nothing but the application of conditional obligations of which diagnostic-therapeutic rules of action primarily consist. And since clinical research pursues such rules of action and tries to improve the available ones, it constitutes explorative and normative ethics based on empirical research and experience.

A central role in Sadegh-Zadeh's medical epistemology play medical theories. He analyzes the concept of "medical theory" in line with the so-called structuralist view of theories to represent their structure and content, according to Patrick Suppes and Joseph D. Sneed's approach, as set-theoretic predicates. This enables him to show that a theory in medicine cannot be confirmed, supported, disconfirmed, verified or falsified simply because it is merely a conceptual structure and no epistemic entity to be true, probable or false. It does not make any empirical claims about the world. Such claims are made using the theory as a tool. The claims themselves, as empirical hypotheses, are something different than the theory.

Not only medical theories, as non-epistemic entities, do not deserve the ascription of truth or falsehood. Regarding any other piece of general medical knowledge, Sadegh-Zadeh shows that apart from the Gettier problem, it does not fulfill the classical definition of knowledge as justified true belief. According to his detailed analysis, there are no justified true beliefs in medicine. Statements, hypotheses and theories in medicine and other fields are usually viewed as knowledge only because the ascription "this is knowledge", for example, that AIDS is caused by HIV is knowledge, is a performative conducted or affirmed by a scientific or professional community as a social group. This communitarian and social epistemology that goes back to the Polish physician and epistemologist Ludwik Fleck (1896–1961), is profitably utilized and extended by Sadegh-Zadeh.

==== Medical deontics ====
Apart from the deontic nature of medical-practical knowledge referred to above, a second reason why Sadegh-Zadeh classifies medicine as a deontic field is his view that according to his prototype resemblance theory of disease, the concept of disease is inherently value-laden. This is so because prototype diseases upon which nosology is based are, as phenomena, disvalued by human beings and are therefore considered to be something "that ought not to be". That means that they are, and consequently all other diseases as their resemblants are, deontic entities.

The deonticity of medicine and of disease as its basic concept necessitates, according to Sadegh-Zadeh, a specific inquiry by means of suitable tools and methods, i.e., deontic logic. This research field he terms medical deontics. It also includes medical ethics, medical metaethics, and medical law.

==== Medical logic ====
Publications entitled "The Logic of Medicine" give rise to the question whether medicine has its own logic like quantum logic is argued to be the logic of quantum mechanics. To answer the question, Sadegh-Zadeh distinguishes between logic in medicine and logic of medicine. "Logic in medicine" means the class of all logics that are, or may be, applied in medicine to solve theoretical or practical problems. Examples are classical two-valued logic, many-valued logic, paraconsistent logic, deontic logic, temporal logic, probability logic, fuzzy logic, and so on. Their number is unlimited. But none of them is specifically made for medical use. This logical pluralism in medicine parallels the mathematical pluralism in that innumerable mathematical theories are used in medicine as well without any of them being "the mathematics of medicine". So, there is no logic of medicine, Sadegh-Zadeh concludes, a logic that could be viewed or used as a specifically medical logic.

==== Medical metaphysics ====
Medical metaphysics is primarily concerned with (i) medical ontology, (ii) medical truth, and (iii) the nature of medicine.

(i) Medical ontology. Sadegh-Zadeh devotes himself extensively to pure, formal, and applied ontology to use them in his logical analysis of medical-ontological issues of medical knowledge, clinical practice, nosology, psychiatry, psychosomatics, and biomedicine such as, for example, whether diseases exist or are fictitious entities invented by nosologists and physicians, and whether particular other things such as genes, psyche, and schizophrenia exist or are mere myths. To settle these enduring controversies and similar ones in medicine, he first distinguishes between ontology de re and ontology de dicto. The distinction is based on a syntactic criterion similar to Barcan formula and enables differentiation between fictional entities such as Sherlock Holmes and real ones. Second, he inaugurates an intriguing fuzzy ontology by introducing a many-place existence operator and fuzzyfying this operator to obtain a quantitative concept of existence that he calls the Heraclitean operator. The Heraclitean operator ranges over the domain of all imaginable entities, including existent, non-existent, and fictitious ones, and over all possible frames of reference, a frame of reference being a particular language and a particular logic. As a result, an entity exists, does not exist, or is fictitious only to a particular extent in the unit interval [0, 1] with respect to a particular language and a particular logic. In this way, ontological stances such as realism, anti-realism, and fictionalism regarding whether something exists or not, become obsolete. For example, schizophrenia may exist with respect to Eugen Bleuler (1857–1939) and his followers' language and logic, while Thomas Szasz and his followers may view it as a myth with respect to their language and logic. The only remedy for irreconcilable ontological controversies of this and similar type is to care about one's unkempt language and logic, and to reach an agreement about which language and conceptual system and which logic should be used in a particular scientific discourse. Anyhow, medical language and its sublanguages as ill-structured and ill-kempt workaday languages are absolutely unsuitable for serious discourses. They allow their users too much latitude in interpretation. "Change your language or logic, and you will see another world".

His fuzzy ontology also includes a fuzzy mereology and mereotopology by means of which vague part-whole relationships, for example in anatomy, surgery and other medical fields, become logically tractable. In addition, he has developed a technique to bring to light the ontological commitments of any piece of medical knowledge so as to ascertain the ontological prerequisites of its satisfiability. He hopes to have paved the way thereby for a precise medical model theory in analogy to the mathematical one, which might enable sophisticated knowledge ontology in medicine and elsewhere, and thus, advanced medical epistemology. "In such a medical model theory, relationships between models of different items of medical knowledge, including theories, could be precisely analyzed". However, he is very skeptical about what has recently come to be known as biomedical ontology engineering in biomedical computer and information sciences. He does not regard this endeavor as ontology at all because it is actually concerned with vocabularies and terminologies confirming the slogan "ontology recapitulates philology".

(ii) On medical truth. After a thorough discussion of truth theories, Sadegh-Zadeh shows that there is sufficient evidence to support the assertion that medical truths are system-relative, and are produced within the respective health care systems themselves. They do not mirror or report scientifically discovered facts in the world out there which could be independent of the conceptual system from where they are viewed and judged. This problem not only concerns truth in medical sciences, but also truth in clinical practice. Specifically, he precisely explicates the concepts of diagnosis, differential diagnosis, and misdiagnosis to demonstrate that the truth and falsehood of all these outcomes of clinical decision-making are relative to the respective medical language and knowledge used, to methods of inquiry applied, to conceptual systems, vocabularies and terminologies constructed and proposed by scientific and professional communities, to regulations issued by health authorities, and to other factors in the health care system that impact on the actions and interactions of the diagnostic personnel. According to Sadegh-Zadeh, medical truth is made in medicine.

(iii) On the nature of medicine. In his analytic philosophy of medicine, Sadegh-Zadeh places particular emphasis on the analysis of medicine as a scientific field. Abandoning widespread, shallow mono-categorizations such as "medicine is a science" versus "medicine is an art", he demonstrates that in declarations of the type "medicine is such and such", the global term "medicine" should be differentiated to acknowledge that medicine, comprising many heterogeneous disciplines, belongs to a large number of categories. For example, without doubt biomedicine is natural science; clinical research, however, is practical science; it is also normative ethics; clinical practice is practiced morality; and so on. What is worth noting, is that medicine is also a poietic science (from the Greek term ποίησις for "making, creating") that invents, designs, and produces medical devices in the widest sense of the term "making", from drugs to prosthetics to brain chips to artificial organs to artificial babies. Medicine is thus on its way to become an engineering science, conducted as health engineering and anthropotechnology.

=== Applied fuzzy logic ===
The application of fuzzy set theory and fuzzy logic to biomedical subjects, clinical problems, and philosophical issues is one of Sadegh-Zadeh's main interests. Prominent among his achievements in this area is the reconstruction of biopolymers (such as nucleic acid chains DNA and RNA and polypeptide chains) as ordered fuzzy sets. This theory of fuzzy biopolymers has made biopolymers amenable to fuzzy set theory and logic and has proved very fruitful thereby to stimulate research interest in different teams. Other examples are (i) extensive application of fuzzy logic in his clinical praxiology and to problems of clinical decision-making; and (ii) fuzzification of deontics and ontology.

=== Philosophy of technology ===
In his methodology of fuzzy concept formation, Sadegh-Zadeh has introduced a fuzzy concept of self-reproduction, termed quasiself-reproduction, that has enabled him to interpret the self-reproducing machines in a completely new way and to suggest a theory of technoevolution. There is something in the nature of technology, he says, that we, as human beings, cannot afford to ignore. It is the tendency of machines to join up and to work together to the effect that a larger machine emerges being more efficient and powerful than its parts. This peculiarity has led in the last centuries to the growth of a distributed, unique Global Machine, GM, which consists of the network of all machines on and around the earth. How this globalization of the machine could occur and what GM looks like, is reconstructed and explained in his theory. Comparable to the bioevolution of animal and plant species, the technoevolution proceeds as a Darwinian one by quasiself-reproduction and selection. GM constitutes a subsystem of a hybrid hypercycle of two evolving partners, biosphere and technosphere, which due to the enormous dynamics of the hypercycle rapidly coevolve. On the part of the technosphere, the salient yield of the coevolution is the advancing mentalization of GM, a process that human beings misconceive as artificial intelligence constructed by them. But according to Sadegh-Zadeh's theory, this is only a myopic interpretation of the gradual, natural emergence of the intelligent and self-conscious Machina sapiens in the guise of a globally distributed machine.

== Selected publications ==
=== Articles ===
- K. Sadegh-Zadeh, Fundamentals of clinical methodology: 1. Differential indication. Artificial Intelligence in Medicine, 1994; 6:83–102.
- K. Sadegh-Zadeh, Fundamentals of clinical methodology: 2. Etiology. Artificial Intelligence in Medicine, 1998; 12:227–270.
- K. Sadegh-Zadeh, Fundamentals of clinical methodology: 3. Nosology. Artificial Intelligence in Medicine, 1999; 17:87–108.
- K. Sadegh-Zadeh, Fundamentals of clinical methodology: 4. Diagnosis. Artificial Intelligence in Medicine, 2000; 20:227–241.
- K. Sadegh-Zadeh, Fuzzy genomes. Artificial Intelligence in Medicine, 2000; 18:1–28.
- K. Sadegh-Zadeh, Fuzzy health, illness, and disease. The Journal of Medicine and Philosophy, 2000; 25:605–638.
- K. Sadegh-Zadeh, The Fuzzy Revolution: Goodbye to the Aristotelian Weltanschauung. Artificial Intelligence in Medicine, 2001; 21:1–25.
- K. Sadegh-Zadeh, The fuzzy polynucleotide space revisited. Artificial Intelligence in Medicine, 2007; 20:227–241.
- K. Sadegh-Zadeh, The prototype resemblance theory of disease. Journal of Medicine and Philosophy, 2008; 33:106–139.
- K. Sadegh-Zadeh, Die Medizin ist eine deontische Disziplin. Angewandte Philosophie, eine internationale Zeitschrift. 2015; 2:10–23.

=== Books ===
- K. Sadegh-Zadeh (as K.S. Zadeh), Man is a Hose (in German: Der Mensch ist ein Schlauch). Tecklenburg / Germany: Burgverlag, 1988.
- K. Sadegh-Zadeh, When Man Forgot How to Think: The Emergence of Machina Sapiens (in German: Als der Mensch das Denken verlernte. Die Entstehung der Machina sapiens). Tecklenburg / Germany: Burgverlag, 2000.
- K. Sadegh-Zadeh, Handbook of Analytic Philosophy of Medicine, 2nd edition. Dordrecht / Holland: Springer, 2015. (1st ed., 2012.)
