= Kaave Lajevardi =

Iranian philosopher (born 1971)

- Born: 1971 (age 54–55)

Education
- Education: University of Toronto (Ph.D.), University of Tehran (M.Sc)
- Thesis: Against Modalities: On the Presumed Coherence and Alleged Indispensability of Some Modal Notions (2008)
- Doctoral advisor: Anjan Chakravartty

Philosophical work
- Era: 21st century Philosophy
- Region: Western philosophy
- School: Analytic
- Institutions: Institute for Research in Fundamental Sciences
- Main interests: Metaphysics of modalities
- Website: http://kaavelajevardi.com/

Kaave Lajevardi (Persian: کاوه لاجوردی) is an Iranian philosopher. He is known for translating classic philosophy books into Persian. Lajevardi was a faculty member of Institute for Research in Fundamental Sciences (2008-2012). He has published some papers on academic dishonesty in Iranian universities.

== Translations ==
- Naming and Necessity, Saul Kripke, Tehran: Hermes
- Wittgenstein on Rules and Private Language, Saul Kripke, Tehran: Markaz
- An Enquiry Concerning Human Understanding, David Hume, Tehran: Markaz
- A Primer of Real Functions, Ralph P. Boas Jr., Tehran: Elmi Farhangi
- A Dialogue on Personal Identity and Immortality, John Perry, Tehran: Markaz
