= Steven French (philosopher) =

Philosopher of Science

- Born: Steven Richard Douglas French; November 8, 1956 (age 69)

Education
- Education: Newcastle University (BSc); University of London (PhD)
- Thesis: Identity and Individuality in Classical and Quantum Physics (1985)
- Doctoral advisors: Michael Redhead

Philosophical work
- Era: Contemporary philosophy
- Region: Western philosophy
- School: Analytic
- Institutions: University of Leeds; Southeast Missouri State University
- Notable students: Otávio Bueno, James Ladyman
- Main interests: Philosophy of science, philosophy of quantum physics, metaphysics
- Notable ideas: Ontic structural realism

Steven Richard Douglas French (born November 8, 1956) is a British philosopher who is professor emeritus of philosophy at the University of Leeds.

== Education ==
French studied physics before coming to philosophy and received his B.Sc. in physics from the Newcastle University in 1978. He then pursued philosophy and received his Ph.D. in philosophy of science in 1985 from the University of London with the dissertation entitled Identity and Individuality in Classical and Quantum Physics under the supervision of Michael Redhead.

== Selected publications ==
=== Monographs ===
- French, Steven (2023). A Phenomenological Approach to Quantum Mechanics. doi:10.1093/oso/9780198897958.001.0001. ISBN 978-0-19-889795-8.
- French, Steven (2020). There Are No Such Things as Theories. doi:10.1093/oso/9780198848158.001.0001. ISBN 978-0-19-884815-8.
- French, Steven (2014). The Structure of the World. doi:10.1093/acprof:oso/9780199684847.001.0001. ISBN 978-0-19-968484-7.

=== Editorials ===
- Ivanova, Milena; French, Steven, eds. (2020). The Aesthetics of Science. doi:10.4324/9780429030284. ISBN 978-0-429-03028-4.
- French, Steven; Saatsi, Juha, eds. (2020). Scientific Realism and the Quantum. doi:10.1093/oso/9780198814979.001.0001. ISBN 978-0-19-881497-9.

=== Articles ===
- French, Steven; Ladyman, James (2003). "Remodelling Structural Realism: Quantum Physics and the Metaphysics of Structure". Synthese. 136: 31–56. doi:10.1023/A:1024156116636.
- French, Steven; Redhead, Michael (1988). "Quantum Physics and the Identity of Indiscernibles". The British Journal for the Philosophy of Science. 39 (2): 233–246. doi:10.1093/bjps/39.2.233.
