= Synthese =

- Discipline: Philosophy, philosophy of science
- Language: English

Publication details
- History: 1936–present
- Publisher: Springer Science+Business Media
- Frequency: Monthly
- Open access: Hybrid
- Impact factor: 1.5 (2022)

Standard abbreviations
- ISO 4: Synthese

Indexing
- ISSN: 0039-7857 (print); 1573-0964 (web)
- LCCN: 49013363
- JSTOR: 00397857
- OCLC no.: 299331447

Links
- Journal homepage; Online archive

Synthese (/sɪnˈteɪzə/) is a monthly peer-reviewed academic journal covering the epistemology, methodology, and philosophy of science, and related issues. The name Synthese (from the Dutch for synthesis) finds its origin in the intentions of its founding editors: making explicit the supposed internal coherence between the different, highly specialised scientific disciplines. Jaakko Hintikka was editor-in-chief from 1965 to 2002. The current editors-in-chief are Otávio Bueno (University of Miami), Wiebe van der Hoek (University of Liverpool), and Kristie Miller (University of Sydney).

== Editorial decision controversies ==
In 2011, the journal became involved in a controversy over intelligent design. The printed version of the special issue Evolution and Its Rivals, which appeared two years after the online version, was supplied with a disclaimer from the then editors of the journal that "appeared to undermine [the authors] and the guest editors".

The journal engendered controversy again in 2016, when an article was called a "homophobic and sexist rant".

"Due to an unfortunate human error", one of the articles accepted for publication in the special issue Logic and Relativity Theory was not sent by the guest editor to the editors of the journal for approval as the then current policies had required. Upon the discovery of this discrepancy, the editors of the journal imposed a moratorium on new special issues for approximately two-three months pending review of the policies.

== Abstracting and indexing ==
The journal is abstracted and indexed in:

- Arts and Humanities Citation Index
- Current Contents/Arts & Humanities
- Index Islamicus
- International Bibliography of Periodical Literature
- Linguistic Bibliography
- MathSciNet
- Modern Language Association Database
- ProQuest databases
- Répertoire International de Littérature Musicale
- Science Citation Index Expanded
- Scopus
- Social Sciences Citation Index
- zbMATH Open

== Reception ==
In 2022, the journal was ranked 4th in a meta-analysis of philosophy journals. According to the Journal Citation Reports, the journal has a 2022 impact factor of 1.5.

== See also ==
- List of philosophy journals
