= Dean Rickles =

British academic

Dean Peter Rickles
- Born: July 17, 1977 (age 49); Hull, Yorkshire, England
- Education: University of Leeds; University of Sheffield
- Known for: Philosophy of quantum gravity and string theory
- Awards: Australian Research Council, Future Fellowship, Australian Research Fellowship, Royal Society (NSW) Medal for HPS
- Scientific career
- Fields: Philosophy of physics, history of physics
- Workplaces: University of Sydney
- Doctoral advisor: Steven French

Dean Rickles (born July 17, 1977) is a British academic, who serves as a professor of History and Philosophy of Modern Physics at the University of Sydney and a Director of the Sydney Centre for Time.

== Life ==
Dean Rickles was born in Hull, Yorkshire. He briefly trained as a concert pianist at the London College of Music, before switching to philosophy. He received an MA from the University of Sheffield (1999) and PhD from the University of Leeds (2004). During a two-year postdoctoral fellowship at the University of Calgary in 2005, he worked on the application of complex systems theory to population health. He took up a lectureship at the University of Sydney in 2007 and was awarded a five-year Australian Research Council fellowship in 2008 followed by an Australian Research Council Future Fellowship in 2014.

== Work ==
Rickles primary focus is on string theory, quantum gravity, and symmetries. His doctoral dissertation, Quantum Gravity in Philosophical Focus (published as a book in 2007), set the foundations for his oft-quoted work within history of string theory and as well as deepening our understanding of the foundations and history of quantum gravity more generally with a series of studies and interviews, culminating in his book Covered in Deep Mist: The Development of Quantum Gravity, 1916-1956 (Oxford University Press 2020).

Other philosophical papers include econophysics, public health and musicology, as well as deeper issues such as the question of why there is anything at all.

In a 2012 collaboration with Huw Price, he developed the John Templeton Foundation project New Agendas for the Study of Time: Connecting the Disciplines.

Rickles was president of Australian Association for the History, Philosophy, and Social Studies of Science and Society (AAHPSSS) during the period 2012–2014. He is also a member of the New York Academy of Sciences and the Foundational Questions Institute. He co-edits the Routledge Studies in the Philosophy of Mathematics and Physics with Elaine Landry.

== Selected works ==
- Philosophy of Mind for the Budding Psychonaut: A Guide. (Springer 2026)
- Harmony of the Spheres: Ancient and Recent Perspectives, co-edited with Ken Parry (Bloomsbury 2025)
- Quantum Gravity and Computation: Information, Pregeometry, and Digital Physics, co-edited with Xerxes D. Arsiwalla and Hatem Elshatlawy (Routledge 2025)
- Varieties of Nothingness, co-edited with Leslie Stein (Chiron 2024)
- Dual-Aspect Monism and the Deep Structure of Meaning, co-authored with Harald Atmanspacher (Routledge 2022)
- Life is Short: An Appropriately Brief Guide to Making it More Meaningful. (Princeton University Press 2022)
- Covered with Deep Mist: The Development of Quantum Gravity, 1916-1956 (Oxford University Press 2020)
- What is Philosophy of Science? (Polity Press 2020)
- Quantum Gravity in the First Half of the 20th Century: A Sourcebook, co-authored with Alex Blum. (Max Planck Research Library for the History and Development of Knowledge 2018)
- Thinking about Science, Reflecting on Art, co-edited with O. Bueno, G. Darby, and S. French (Routledge 2017)
- Dualities in Physics, co-edited with Elena Castellani (Special issue: Studies in the History and Philosophy of Modern Physics 2017)
- Philosophy of Physics (Polity Press 2016)
- Information and Interaction: Eddington, Wheeler, and the Limits of Knowledge, co-edited with Ian Durham (Springer 2016)
- A Brief History of String Theory: From Dual Models to M-Theory (Springer 2014)
- Flow of Time (New York Academy of Sciences, Hoboken, NJ 2014).
- Principles of Quantum Gravity, co-edited with Karen Crowther (Special issue: Studies in the History and Philosophy of Modern Physics 2014)
- Structural Realism: Structure, Object, and Causality, co-edited with Elaine Landry (The Western Ontario Series in Philosophy of Science, Volume 77, Springer 2012)
- The Role of Gravitation in Physics, co-edited with Cécile DeWitt (Max Planck Research Library for the History and Development of Knowledge, Volume 5, 2011)
- Ashgate Companion to Contemporary Philosophy of Physics (Ashgate 2008)
- Symmetry, Structure, and Spacetime, Series on Philosophy and Foundations of Physics, Volume 3 (Elsevier 2007)
- The Structural Foundations of Quantum Gravity, co-edited with Steven French and Juha Saatsi (Oxford University Press 2006)
