= Otávio Bueno =

Scholar of philosophy

- Born: Otávio Augusto Santos Bueno; 1970 (age 55–56)

Education
- Education: University of São Paulo (BSc); University of São Paulo (MPhil); University of Leeds (PhD)
- Thesis: Philosophy of Mathematics: A Structural Empiricist View (1999)
- Doctoral advisors: Steven French

Philosophical work
- Era: Contemporary philosophy
- Region: Western philosophy
- School: Analytic
- Institutions: University of Miami; University of South Carolina; California State University
- Main interests: Philosophy of science, philosophy of mathematics
- Notable ideas: Agnostic nominalism in the philosophy of mathematics
- Website: https://web.as.miami.edu/personal/obueno/Site/Otavio_Bueno.html

Otávio Augusto Santos Bueno (born 1970) is a Brazilian philosopher who is professor of philosophy at the University of Miami.

Otávio Bueno earned his master’s degree from the Faculty of Philosophy, Letters, and Human Sciences at University of São Paulo and holds a PhD from the University of Leeds.

== Books ==
=== As author ===
- Bueno, Otávio; French, Steven (2018). Applying Mathematics: Immersion, Inference, Interpretation. Oxford Scholarship Online. Oxford University Press. doi:10.1093/oso/9780198815044.001.0001. ISBN 978-0-19-881504-4.

=== As editor ===
- Bueno, Otávio; Linnebo, Øystein, eds. (2009). New Waves in Philosophy of Mathematics. Palgrave Macmillan. ISBN 978-0-230-24519-8.
- Bueno, Otávio; Darby, George; French, Steven; Rickles, Dean, eds. (2023). Thinking about Science, Reflecting on Art: Bringing Aesthetics and Philosophy of Science Together (1st ed.). Routledge. doi:10.4324/9781315114927. ISBN 978-1-315-11492-7.
  - Bueno, Otávio; Darby, George; French, Steven; Rickles, Dean, eds. (2023). Thinking about Science, Reflecting on Art: Bringing Aesthetics and Philosophy of Science Together (2nd ed.). Routledge. ISBN 978-1-032-56986-4.
- Bueno, Otávio; Chen, Ruey-lin; Fagan, Melinda Bonnie, eds. (2018). Individuation, Process, and Scientific Practices. Oxford University Press. ISBN 978-0-19-063684-5.
- Bueno, Otávio; Shalkowski, Scott A., eds. (2021). The Routledge Handbook of Modality. Routledge handbooks in philosophy. London New York: Routledge. ISBN 978-0-367-68954-4.
