= Epistemic commitment =

Epistemic commitment is an obligation, which may be withdrawn only under appropriate circumstances, to uphold the factual truth of a given proposition, and to provide reasons for one's belief in that proposition. Epistemic means 'of, or relating to knowledge'. An epistemic commitment of some kind, on the part of the participants, underlies most arguments. For instance, each participant in an argument would have a position that they are expressing, and an underlying epistemic commitment fundamental to their reasoning.

== Example 1 ==
Joe states that whales are gentle creatures, and as such, should never be killed.

Susan replies that killer whales are not 'gentle', in fact, they eat seal pups.

Joe, instead of revising his earlier stated opinion of whales based on new information from Susan, asserts that killer whales must not actually be whales, because a 'true whale eats plankton.' Joe has now redefined 'whale' to suit his argument.

If Susan shows Joe a book which asserts that killer whales are, in fact, whales, then Joe might (or might not) decide to withdraw his epistemic commitment to the original statement about whales.

== Example 2 ==
Susan states the killer whales are whales because 'whale' is in their name.

Joe replies that killer whales are not whales but dolphins despite having whale in their name.

Susan, instead of revising her earlier stated opinion of whales based on new information from Joe, asserts that killer whales must be whales because they look like other whales. Susan has now redefined 'whale' to suit her argument.

If Joe shows Susan a book showing that killer whales are, in fact, dolphins, then Susan might (or might not) decide to withdraw her epistemic commitment to the original statement about killer whales.

== See also ==
- No true Scotsman
