= Tim Lewens =

British historian and philosopher (born 1974)

Timothy Mark Lewens
- Born: 29 June 1974 (age 51)

Philosophical work
- Era: Modern
- Region: British philosophy
- Main interests: History and philosophy of science
- Website: www.people.hps.cam.ac.uk/index/teaching-officers/lewens/

Tim Lewens (born 29 June 1974) is a professor in the history and philosophy of biology, medicine, and bioethics at the Department of History and Philosophy of Science at the University of Cambridge. Lewens is a Fellow of Clare College, where he serves as Director of Studies in Philosophy and he is a member of the academic staff and lecturer in the Department of History and Philosophy of Science (HPS).

== Background ==
Lewens completed his PhD thesis at the Department of HPS, Cambridge University in 2001. He became a lecturer in History and Philosophy of Science at Cambridge soon after completing his doctoral thesis. He now serves as a governor at Exeter School where he was formerly a pupil. He was member of the Nuffield Council on Bioethics from 2009 to 2015 and a member of the Council's Working Party on human bodies in medicine and research (report published autumn 2011).

== Research ==
Lewens has written and lectured extensively on evolution and his book on this subject, Organisms and Artifacts: Design in Nature and Elsewhere (2004) received wide critical acclaim, as did his 2007 monograph on Charles Darwin.

From 2014 to 2017 Lewens was Deputy Director of Cambridge University's Centre for Research in the Arts, Social Sciences and Humanities.

== Honours ==
Lewens was 2005's Philip Leverhulme Prize Philosophy subject. In 2008, He was one of eleven recipients of the University of Cambridge's Pilkington Prize for the quality of his teaching.

== Selected publications ==
- Walsh, Denis M., Lewens, Tim and Ariew, Andre (2002). The Trials of Life: Natural Selection and Random Drift. Philosophy of Science Vol. 69, No. 3, pp. 452-473
- Lewens, Tim (2004). Organisms and Artifacts: Design in Nature and Elsewhere. Bradford Books, Life and Mind Series. Cambridge, MA: MIT Press. ISBN 978-0-262-12261-0.
- Lewens, Tim (2006). Darwin. London: Routledge. p. 289. ISBN 978-0-415-34638-2.
- Lewens, Tim (2015). The Meaning of Science: A Pelican Introduction. Pelican. p. 294. ISBN 978-0-141-97742-3.
