= BioEssays =

- Discipline: Biology
- Language: English
- Edited by: Kerstin Brachhold

Publication details
- History: 1984–present
- Publisher: John Wiley & Sons
- Frequency: Monthly
- Impact factor: 4.725 (2015)

Standard abbreviations
- ISO 4: BioEssays

Indexing
- CODEN: BIOEEJ
- ISSN: 0265-9247 (print); 1521-1878 (web)
- LCCN: 98641457
- OCLC no.: 11195715

Links
- Journal homepage; Online access; Online archive

BioEssays is a monthly peer-reviewed review journal covering molecular and cellular biology. Areas covered include genetics, genomics, epigenetics, evolution, developmental biology, neuroscience, human biology, physiology, systems biology, and plant biology. The journal also publishes commentaries on aspects of science communication, education, policy, and current affairs.

== History ==
The journal was established in December 1984 by founding editor-in-chief William J. Whelan under the auspices of the International Union of Biochemistry and Molecular Biology. Adam S. Wilkins became editor in January 1990. Originally published by ICSU Press and The Company of Biologists, BioEssays has been published by John Wiley & Sons since January 1998. Andrew Moore became editor-in-chief in August 2008. Kerstin Brachhold is current editor-in-chief.

== Abstracting and indexing ==
The journal is abstracted and indexed in:

- AGRICOLA
- Aquatic Sciences and Fisheries Abstracts
- BIOBASE
- BIOSIS
- CAB Abstracts
- Cambridge Scientific Abstracts
- Chemical Abstracts Service
- CSA Biological Sciences Database
- Current Awareness in Biological Sciences
- Current Contents (Life Sciences)
- EMBASE/Excerpta Medica
- Institute for Scientific Information
- MEDLINE/Index Medicus
- Scopus
- The Zoological Record

According to the Journal Citation Reports, the journal has a 2012 impact factor of 5.423.
