= Studies in History and Philosophy of Science =

Studies in History and Philosophy of Science is a series of three peer-reviewed academic journals published by Elsevier. It was established in 1970 as a single journal, and was split into two sections–Studies in History and Philosophy of Science Part A and Studies in History and Philosophy of Science Part B: Studies in History and Philosophy of Modern Physics–in 1995. In 1998, a third section, Studies in History and Philosophy of Science Part C: Studies in History and Philosophy of Biological and Biomedical Sciences, was created. In January 2021, all three sections were merged back into Part A, Studies in History and Philosophy of Science.

== Part A ==
Studies in History and Philosophy of Science Part A
- Discipline: Philosophy of science, history of science
- Language: English
- Edited by: Darrell P. Rowbottom

Publication details
- History: 1970–present
- Publisher: Elsevier
- Frequency: 7/year
- Impact factor: 1.21 (2019)

Standard abbreviations
- ISO 4: Stud. Hist. Philos. Sci. A

Indexing
- CODEN: SHPSB5
- ISSN: 0039-3681 (print); 1879-2510 (web)

Links
- Journal homepage

Studies in History and Philosophy of Science Part A was established in 1970 and is published 7 times per year. It covers the philosophy and history of science. The editor-in-chief is Darrell P. Rowbottom (Lingnan University). According to the Journal Citation Reports, the journal has a 2017 impact factor of 0.748.

== Part B ==
Studies in History and Philosophy of Science Part B
- Discipline: Philosophy of science, modern physics
- Language: English
- Edited by: Dennis Dieks, James Ladyman, Wayne Myrvold

Publication details
- History: 1995–present
- Publisher: Elsevier
- Frequency: Quarterly
- Impact factor: 0.382 (2016)

Standard abbreviations
- ISO 4: Stud. Hist. Philos. Sci. B

Indexing
- ISSN: 1355-2198 (print); 1879-2502 (web)

Links
- Journal homepage

Studies in History and Philosophy of Science Part B was established in 1995 and covers the philosophy of science as it pertains to modern physics. The editors-in-chief are Dennis Dieks (Utrecht University), James Ladyman (University of Bristol), and Wayne Myrvold (University of Western Ontario). According to the Journal Citation Reports, the journal has a 2016 impact factor of 0.382.

== Part C ==
Studies in History and Philosophy of Science Part C
- Discipline: Philosophy of science, biology, biomedicine
- Language: English
- Edited by: Rachel A. Ankeny

Publication details
- History: 1998–present
- Publisher: Elsevier
- Frequency: Quarterly

Standard abbreviations
- ISO 4: Stud. Hist. Philos. Sci. C

Indexing
- ISSN: 1369-8486 (print); 1879-2499 (web)

Links
- Journal homepage

Studies in History and Philosophy of Science Part C covers the history and philosophy of biology and biomedical science. It was established in 1998 and is published quarterly. The editor-in-chief is Rachel A. Ankeny (University of Adelaide).
