= British Society for the Philosophy of Science =

The British Society for the Philosophy of Science (BSPS) is a philosophical society based in the United Kingdom that aims to further the philosophy of science, and which manages the British Journal for the Philosophy of Science. The BSPS was founded in 1948 as a Philosophy of Science Group for the British Society for the History of Science, and reconstituted with its present name in 1959.
