= Scientific realism =

View in philosophy of science

Scientific realism is the philosophical view that the universe described by science (including both observable and unobservable aspects) exists independently of perception, and that verified scientific theories are at least approximately true descriptions of what is real. Scientific realists typically assert that science, when successful, uncovers true (or approximately true) knowledge about nature, including aspects of reality that are not directly observable.

Within philosophy of science, this view is often an answer to the question "how is the success of science to be explained?" The discussion on the success of science in this context centers primarily on the status of unobservable entities apparently talked about by scientific theories. Generally, those who are scientific realists assert that one can make valid claims about unobservables (viz., that they have the same ontological status) as observables, as opposed to instrumentalism.

In a 2020 PhilPapers Survey 72% of academic philosophers favored scientific realism vs only 15% favoring antirealism.

== Main features ==
Scientific realism involves two basic positions:

- Ideal-theory thesis. It offers a set of criteria for an ideal scientific theory; one that science aims to approximate.
- Convergence thesis. It maintains that, in at least some well-established domains, the theories scientists now accept already approximate that ideal and will do so ever more closely as inquiry progresses.

Realists often adopt this theses selectively; one may be realist about mature fields such as fundamental physics while remaining agnostic about less-settled areas.

An ideal scientific theory, on the realist view, satisfies three interconnected commitments:

- Semantic: Its central claims are either true or false because they purport to describe the real world.
- Metaphysical: The entities it posits (e.g. electrons, genes) exist objectively and independent of the mind.
- Epistemic: We have good reason to believe many of those claims because the theory's explanatory and predictive success would be improbable if they were not at least approximately true.

Taken together, the first two commitments imply that an ideal theory makes definite assertions about genuinely existent entities, while the third justifies believing a significant subset of those assertions.

Realists therefore argue that science progresses: later theories generally answer more questions or do so more accurately, thus moving closer, though never necessarily reaching, the ideal of a literally true account of nature.

=== Characteristic claims ===
The following claims are typical of those held by scientific realists. Due to the wide disagreements over the nature of science's success and the role of realism in its success, a scientific realist would agree with some but not all of the following positions.

- The best scientific theories are at least partially true.
- The best theories do not employ central terms that are non referring expressions.
- To say that a theory is approximately true is sufficient explanation of the degree of its predictive success.
- The approximate truth of a theory is the only explanation of its predictive success.
- Even if a theory employs expressions that do not have a reference, a scientific theory may be approximately true.
- Scientific theories are in a historical process of progress towards a true account of the physical world.
- Scientific theories make genuine, existential claims.
- Theoretical claims of scientific theories should be read literally and are definitively either true or false.
- The degree of the predictive success of a theory is evidence of the referential success of its central terms.
- The goal of science is an account of the physical world that is literally true. Science has been successful because this is the goal that it has been making progress towards.

== History ==
Scientific realism is related to much older philosophical positions including rationalism and metaphysical realism. However, it is a thesis about science developed in the twentieth century. Portraying scientific realism in terms of its ancient, medieval, and early modern cousins is at best misleading.

Scientific realism is developed largely as a reaction to logical positivism. Logical positivism was the first philosophy of science in the twentieth century and the forerunner of scientific realism, holding that a sharp distinction can be drawn between theoretical terms and observational terms, the latter capable of semantic analysis in observational and logical terms.

Logical positivism encountered difficulties with:

- The verificationist theory of meaning—see Hempel (1950).
- Troubles with the analytic-synthetic distinction—see Quine (1950).
- The theory-ladenness of observation—see Hanson (1958) Kuhn (1970) and Quine (1960).
- Difficulties moving from the observationality of terms to observationality of sentences—see Putnam (1962).
- The vagueness of the observational-theoretical distinction—see G. Maxwell (1962).

These difficulties for logical positivism suggest, but do not entail, scientific realism, and led to the development of realism as a philosophy of science.

Realism became the dominant philosophy of science after positivism. Bas van Fraassen in his book The Scientific Image (1980) developed constructive empiricism as an alternative to realism. He argues against scientific realism that scientific theories do not aim for truth about unobservable entities. Responses to van Fraassen have sharpened realist positions and led to some revisions of scientific realism.

== Arguments for and against scientific realism ==
=== No miracles argument ===
One of the main arguments for scientific realism centers on the notion that scientific knowledge is progressive in nature, and that it is able to predict phenomena successfully. Many scientific realists (e.g., Ernan McMullin, Richard Boyd) think the operational success of a theory lends credence to the idea that its more unobservable aspects exist, because they were how the theory reasoned its predictions. For example, a scientific realist would argue that science must derive some ontological support for atoms from the outstanding phenomenological success of all the theories using them.

Arguments for scientific realism often appeal to abductive reasoning or "inference to the best explanation" (Lipton, 2004). For instance, one argument commonly used—the "miracle argument" or "no miracles argument"—starts out by observing that scientific theories are highly successful in predicting and explaining a variety of phenomena, often with great accuracy. Thus, it is argued that the best explanation—the only explanation that renders the success of science to not be what Hilary Putnam calls "a miracle"—is the view that our scientific theories (or at least the best ones) provide true descriptions of the world, or approximately so.

Bas van Fraassen replies with an evolutionary analogy: "I claim that the success of current scientific theories is no miracle. It is not even surprising to the scientific (Darwinist) mind. For any scientific theory is born into a life of fierce competition, a jungle red in tooth and claw. Only the successful theories survive—the ones which in fact latched on to actual regularities in nature." (The Scientific Image, 1980)

It has been argued that the no miracles argument commits the base rate fallacy.

=== Pessimistic induction ===
Pessimistic induction, one of the main arguments against realism, argues that the history of science contains many theories once regarded as empirically successful but which are now believed to be false. Additionally, the history of science contains many empirically successful theories whose unobservable terms are not believed to genuinely refer. For example, the effluvium theory of static electricity (a theory of the 16th Century physicist William Gilbert) is an empirically successful theory whose central unobservable terms have been replaced by later theories.

Realists reply that replacement of particular realist theories with better ones is to be expected due to the progressive nature of scientific knowledge, and when such replacements occur only superfluous unobservables are dropped. For example, Albert Einstein's theory of special relativity showed that the concept of the luminiferous ether could be dropped because it had contributed nothing to the success of the theories of mechanics and electromagnetism. On the other hand, when theory replacement occurs, a well-supported concept, such as the concept of atoms, is not dropped but is incorporated into the new theory in some form. These replies can lead scientific realists to structural realism.

=== Constructivist epistemology ===
Social constructivists might argue that scientific realism is unable to account for the rapid change that occurs in scientific knowledge during periods of scientific revolution. Constructivists may also argue that the success of theories is only a part of the construction.

However, these arguments ignore the fact that many scientists are not realists. During the development of quantum mechanics in the 1920s, the dominant philosophy of science was logical positivism. The alternative realist Bohm interpretation and many-worlds interpretation of quantum mechanics do not make such a revolutionary break with the concepts of classical physics.

=== Underdetermination problem ===
Another argument against scientific realism, deriving from the underdetermination problem, is not so historically motivated as these others. It claims that observational data can in principle be explained by multiple theories that are mutually incompatible. Realists might counter by saying that there have been few actual cases of underdetermination in the history of science. Usually the requirement of explaining the data is so exacting that scientists are lucky to find even one theory that fulfills it. Furthermore, if we take the underdetermination argument seriously, it implies that we can know about only what we have directly observed. For example, we could not theorize that dinosaurs once lived based on the fossil evidence because other theories (e.g., that the fossils are clever hoaxes) can account for the same data.

=== Incompatible models argument ===
According to the incompatible models argument, in certain cases the existence of diverse models for a single phenomenon can be taken as evidence of anti-realism. One example is due to Margaret Morrison, who worked to show that the shell model and the liquid-drop model give contradictory descriptions of the atomic nucleus, even though both models are predictive.

== See also ==
- Anti-realism
- Constructivist epistemology
- Critical realism (philosophy of perception)
- Dialectical materialism
- Instrumentalism
- Musgrave's scientific realism
- Naïve realism
- Pessimistic induction
- Scientific materialism
- Scientific perspectivism
- Scientific skepticism
- Scientism
- Social constructionism
