= Reality =

Totality of existing entities

Reality is the totality of existence or what all existing entities have in common. It is often contrasted with appearance, opposing what is with what seems to be, although the accuracy and fundamentality of this contrast are disputed. Various criteria for distinguishing real from unreal entities have been proposed, including causal powers, mind-independence, and being non-illusory. The concept of reality overlaps with notions such as being, existence, world, actuality, and truth.

Philosophers debate what kinds of things are part of reality and how they are organized. Proposed constituents include particulars and universals, concrete and abstract objects, facts, events, and elementary particles. Discussions of the structure of reality address the relation between parts and wholes, the distinction between fundamental and non-fundamental entities, the idea that reality forms a hierarchy of levels, and the roles of unity and multiplicity in monist–pluralist debates. Other topics are space and time as frameworks that organize relations among entities, and laws of nature describing regularities or general patterns of how entities interact and changes unfold.

Realism is the view that reality does not depend on human knowledge or consciousness. Anti-realism rejects this idea and holds that certain aspects of reality are shaped by mental processes, subjective perspectives, or social conventions. Debates between realists and anti-realists address the objective existence of various types of entities, including universals, abstract objects, values, and unobservable entities posited by scientific theories. A related topic concerns the possibility and limits of knowledge as a successful cognitive contact with reality. Contemporary technology in the form of augmented and virtual reality can inform experience and raises questions about the ontological status of virtual objects.

The concept of reality is relevant to many fields, including metaphysics, epistemology, physics, psychology, and anthropology. Theories of the nature of reality have been discussed since antiquity, with influential early traditions originating in ancient Indian, Chinese, and Greek thought.

== Definition ==
Reality is the totality of existing entities. It encompasses the whole cosmos and everything within it, including rocks, trees, humans, and stars. In a slightly different sense, reality is not the totality itself but an aspect shared by all its constituents. In this sense, it is the state of being real or what all real entities have in common, separating them from unreal or illusory ones. When used as a countable noun, the expression a reality denotes a specific domain or coherent, interconnected framework, such as the social reality of a particular culture or the virtual reality of a specific video game world.

Reality is often contrasted with appearance: appearance is how things seem to be, while reality is how they in fact are. It is controversial whether this contrast marks a genuine and fundamental difference between an experienced realm of appearances and an inaccessible realm of reality. Another outlook holds that appearance and reality are different ways of considering the same being, locating the difference in the conceptual framing rather than a division of worlds. This view is consistent with the idea that accurate appearances show things as they are, suggesting that appearance and reality can align and are not necessarily distinct. Both accurate and inaccurate appearances may themselves be part of reality, for instance as brain events, according to one suggestion. Real entities are typically taken to exist on their own, independent of what people think about them. When a person encounters them, their appearances may reveal only some features while leaving others hidden. Whereas appearances can be vague, as in a blurry vision, it is often suggested that reality is fully determinate or fixed in all details.

The word reality comes from the Latin term realitas, rooted in the word res, meaning 'thing', and from the French term réalité. Its earliest known use in English dates to the early 1500s. The concept of reality is relevant to many fields, including metaphysics, a branch of philosophy that studies the nature and fundamental structure of reality, and the empirical sciences, which examine the constituents and laws of the natural world through observation and experimentation.

=== Criteria ===
Criteria of reality are proposed features or standards that distinguish real entities from unreal ones. An often-cited criterion identifies causal powers as the mark of reality. Discussed in ancient Greek philosophy as the Eleatic principle, it states that to be real is to be able to produce changes and to be affected by them. For example, Mahatma Gandhi was real because he was able to mobilize millions and shape India's struggle for independence. Santa Claus, by contrast, is unreal because he cannot act upon the world. However, stories about Santa Claus, such as written texts in children's books, are part of reality since they can influence how people think. The Eleatic principle is controversial because it is typically taken to deny that abstract objects studied in fields like mathematics, such as numbers, are real.

Another influential proposal treats mind-independence as a criterion of reality, arguing that real entities do not depend on how people think about them. This view emphasizes that reality is encountered, rather than invented, and can resist or frustrate beliefs and desires, unlike malleable imaginary creations. For example, if a planet or a virus is real then it exists on its own and behaves according to its nature, even if people are unaware or hold false beliefs about it. Unreal entities, by contrast, depend for their existence on thoughts and ideas; they would not arise or would vanish without the mental activity creating or sustaining them. For instance, a fictional character like Gandalf would not be there if no one had ever thought about him. A difficulty for this criterion is to account for the reality of mental entities themselves, given that thoughts, memories, and emotions seem to be part of the world.

A closely related criterion holds that to be real is to be non-illusory. It focuses on how things seem to be, distinguishing real appearances, which are as they seem, from illusory ones, which are not as they seem. In a broad sense, appearances are not limited to what people perceive but can also include memories, beliefs, and thoughts. According to this criterion, veridical perceptions track reality by presenting it as it is, whereas entities found in hallucinations, dreams, and mirages count as unreal because they misrepresent the world.

A different criterion equates reality with being genuine. Proposed by J. L. Austin and grounded in ordinary language philosophy, it suggests that being real is always relative to a category or entity, such as a real diamond. This view contrasts being real with being fake, like the distinction between a real duck and a fake one used as a decoy. A challenge for approaches grounded in ordinary language is that the term real serves many linguistic purposes, not all of which are relevant to the metaphysical concept of reality. For example, it can express that something is excellent relative to its kind, as in the exclamation "Now this is real coffee!"

Other suggested criteria identify reality with what is observable, measurable, (Note: Measurability plays a key role in scientific conceptions of reality.) coherent, (Note: For example, philosophers such as Zeno of Elea and F. H. Bradley have argued that certain phenomena, like time and motion, are unreal because they are incoherent or paradoxical.) useful, objective, intersubjective, or fundamental.

=== Related concepts ===
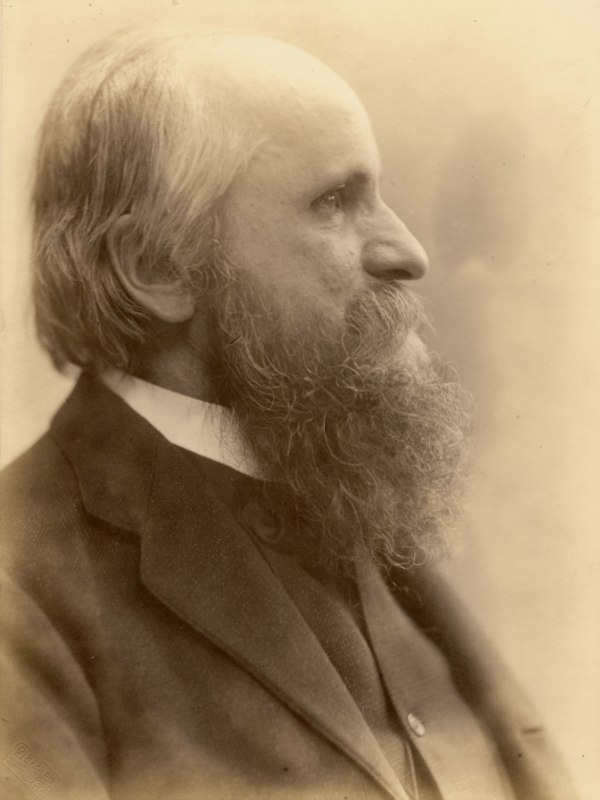
According to Alexius Meinong, the concept of being is broader than the concept of reality since it also encompasses nonexistent objects.

The term reality overlaps with various related concepts, such as being, existence, world, actuality, and truth. Depending on the context, these terms may function as synonyms or play distinct theoretical roles. In the broadest sense, being is the most general category that applies to everything and contrasts only with nothingness. Some philosophers, such as Alexius Meinong, hold that being is a broader concept than reality, encompassing nonexistent objects, such as merely possible or incomplete objects, in addition to real or actual ones. In a narrow sense, being contrasts with becoming, and denotes stable or permanent aspects of reality. Becoming, by contrast, covers change, like when an entity shifts from one state of being to another. A central topic in ontology is the categories of being—fundamental classes that map out a comprehensive inventory of reality.

Existence is commonly understood as the bare fact that something is, indicating that an entity is part of the world without specifying its nature. It is often contrasted with essence, which denotes the nature or characteristic features of an entity. It is frequently possible to understand the essence of something without knowing whether it exists. Ontologists discuss whether existence can be understood as a property of individuals, analogous to ordinary features like being red, or whether it is instead a concept or quantificational device expressing that a property has instances.

A world is a totality of entities, conceived as a maximally large situation or a system encompassing everything in space and time as a whole: all that was, is, and will be. Some philosophers hold that reality consists of only one world: the actual universe. A different view suggests that reality is made up of many worlds that exist in parallel to one another, each representing a distinct way of how things could have been. For example, David Lewis's modal realism asserts that there exist countless spatiotemporally unified possible worlds, each just as real as the actual world. Similarly, the many-worlds interpretation of quantum physics suggests that in quantum measurements, not only one but all possible outcomes occur, interpreted as a branching of the universe into multiple worlds.

Actuality encompasses the states of entities that are realized or manifested. It contrasts with potentiality, which denotes dispositions an entity has but does not exercise. For example, an acorn has the potential to grow into an oak tree under the right conditions, but the oak tree is not yet actualized. In a slightly different sense, actuality is often discussed in relation to possibility and necessity as different modes of being. Actuality comprises what is the case, possibility denotes what could be the case, and necessity concerns what must be the case. The distinction is often framed in terms of possible worlds: a state is possible if it holds in at least one possible world; it is actual if it holds in the actual world; and it is necessary if it holds in all possible worlds. While actuality and necessity are often treated as aspects of reality, there are debates about the extent to which possibilities are part of it, for example, regarding the contrast between real or authentic possibilities and formal or inauthentic ones.

Truth is conformity to reality. It contrasts with falsehood, which encompasses misrepresentations that do not align with reality. Truth is often understood as a property of statements or beliefs that describe the world as it is. In this sense, truth is not the same as reality but a feature of accurate representations of it: truth depends on reality. In a different sense, the term truth is used as a synonym for reality, as in the statement "In truth, he was not qualified for the job." Various theories of the nature of truth have been proposed. According to correspondence theory, a statement is true if it corresponds to facts. The coherence theory suggests that truth consists in logical consistency and mutual support among beliefs. Pragmatic theories define truth relative to consequences, holding that truth is what works or what would withstand the test of unlimited inquiry. Deflationary theories hold that truth has no significant intrinsic nature beyond its minimal linguistic role in truth-related expressions.

== Constituents ==
Various categories of being or constituents of reality are discussed in the academic discourse. There are disagreements about which exist at the most fundamental level and whether reality is ultimately composed of one or several types.

A central distinction is between particulars and universals. Particulars are unique, non-repeatable entities, such as Julius Caesar, the river Nile, and the Moon. As individual entities, they contrast with universals, which are general, repeatable entities that can have many instances, such as the color blue, the shape roundness, and the property of being a mammal. Particulars are often characterized as entities that instantiate universals but are not themselves instantiated by anything else. In this sense, they exist in themselves, while universals exist in something else.

Universals are often analyzed in terms of properties (Note: Trope theory offers an alternative view by treating properties as particularized instances, called tropes.) and relations. A property expresses a characteristic or quality of another entity. For example, roundness is a property of the particulars the Moon and the Sun. Relations are ways in which two or more entities stand to one another. For instance, being-smaller-than is a relation that holds between the Moon and the Sun. One approach analyzes the instantiation of universals in terms of facts or states of affairs. For example, the fact "Socrates is mortal" has two components: the particular Socrates and the universal mortality. Events are proposed constituents of reality that occur in time, such as the discovery of penicillin and the Second World War.

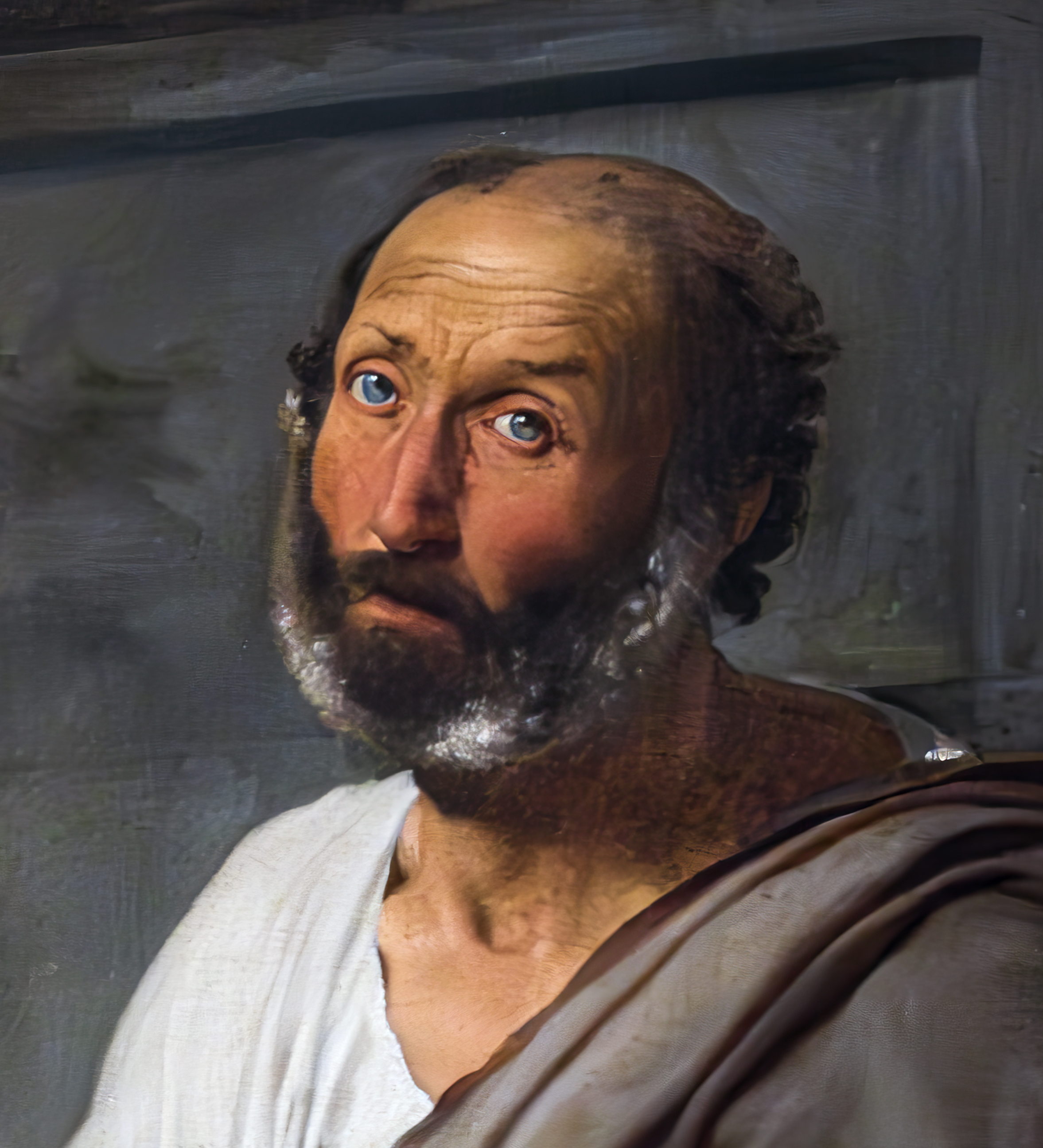
Aristotle proposed a system of ten categories to describe the fundamental constituents of reality.

Another influential distinction is between concrete and abstract objects. According to a common view, concrete objects exist in space and time, such as a flower, a horse, and a ship. They can undergo changes, have causal powers, and influence each other, like when a horse eats a flower and destroys it in the process. Abstract objects lack spatiotemporal location, do not change, and have neither causes nor effects, (Note: The exact definition of abstract objects is disputed.) such as mathematical numbers and geometrical shapes. It is disputed whether abstract objects are fundamental constituents of reality or merely conceptual constructions.

Philosophers have proposed various theories of categories. Aristotle developed a system of ten categories, which has substance as the central category while other categories, such as quantity, quality, and place, depend on substances or act as modifications. Immanuel Kant outlined a system of twelve categories, which he regarded as pure concepts of understanding, divided into the classes of quantity, quality, relation, and modality. Other theories in the Western tradition were proposed by Edmund Husserl, Samuel Alexander, Roderick Chisholm, and E. J. Lowe. In ancient Hindu philosophy, the school of Samkhya identified pure consciousness and matter as the two foundational principles of reality, while the school of Vaisheshika proposed a system of six categories: substance, quality, motion, universal, particular, and inherence. In ancient Chinese thought, Taoism regarded the Tao as the omnipresent, self-existent, imperceptible, and incomprehensible source of all existence. The related yinyang school treated yin and yang as two correlated forces whose interaction underlies all natural processes.

Physicists use concepts such as elementary particle, force, field, and spacetime to analyze the fundamental constituents of the universe. In quantum mechanics, the Standard Model describes all known elementary particles, dividing them into two classes: fermions, such as electrons, and bosons, such as photons. It also describes their interactions through all fundamental forces except gravity, which is explained by the theory of general relativity. String theory is an attempt to unify quantum mechanics and general relativity, positing tiny vibrating strings as the basic constituents underlying elementary particles and their interactions.

== Structure ==
=== Composition ===
The structure of reality concerns the fundamental patterns of being, describing how entities are organized and interact with each other. Mereology is the theory of part–whole relations, examining how entities compose larger wholes and the laws governing their composition. Many everyday objects are complex entities made up of several parts. For example, a table is composed of a tabletop and the legs supporting it. Parts can themselves be made up of smaller parts, such as the molecules that constitute the tabletop.

Various theories of the mereological principles underlying composition have been proposed. Mereological universalism holds that any collection of entities constitutes a whole, even if the entities are otherwise unrelated. According to mereological moderatism, groups of entities must meet certain conditions to count as a whole. One suggested condition is that the parts are in contact with each other, excluding arbitrary groupings, such as a collection made up of the Great Wall of China and Mexico City International Airport. Mereological nihilists deny that any wholes exist, arguing that fundamentally, there are only simple entities and no composites. Another metaphysical discussion addresses the reality of simple or indivisible entities, which have no proper parts. Atomists affirm their existence, whereas continuum theorists hold that matter is infinitely divisible.

=== Fundamentality ===
According to some proposals, reality has a hierarchical structure in which fundamental entities ground non-fundamental ones.

Another structural feature concerns the idea that some entities depend on, or are grounded in, other entities. For example, one view suggests that macroscopic objects, such as a chair, depend on the microscopic objects that underlie them, such as elementary particles. Ontologists are particularly interested in the most fundamental level of reality, which is made up of entities that do not depend on anything else, are not grounded in other entities, or constitute a minimal basis that determines everything else.

There are different ways to conceptualize the relation between fundamental and non-fundamental entities, including the ideas of ontological dependence, metaphysical grounding, reduction, supervenience, and emergence. Some outlooks suggest that only the fundamental level is ultimately real, arguing that non-fundamental entities are in some sense eliminable since reality can be described without them. A different view contends that dependence does not entail eliminability. For example, strong emergence theories assert that higher-level entities are genuinely novel and causally interact with lower-level entities without being reducible to them. Flat ontologies deny that there is a hierarchical structure to reality, claiming that all entities exist on the same level.

The Absolute, a closely related concept, is conceived as an ultimate reality that is self-existent, free from external conditions, and independent of anything else. The concept is discussed in German idealism and in various theological traditions. In the Hindu tradition, it is often identified with Brahman as the all-pervasive reality and the supreme principle grounding all being. For example, the school of Advaita Vedanta distinguishes the ultimate, divine reality of Brahman from the field of illusory appearances, termed Maya, associated with the empirical realm of everyday experience.

==== Levels of reality ====
Some philosophical approaches rely on the idea of fundamentality and dependence to analyze the world in terms of levels or layers, such as material, biological, psychological, and social reality. One perspective interprets these levels as a methodological tool or a way of organizing scientific research: physics studies matter, whereas biology investigates living organisms, and psychology examines the mind. A more metaphysical outlook suggests that the different levels are not merely a methodological convenience but reflect the inherent structure of reality. On this view, higher levels show greater complexity and new phenomena but depend on the lower ones and could not exist without them. Lower levels, by contrast, operate according to more basic mechanisms and are prior to the higher ones. In this sense, there can be matter without biological life, whereas life is built upon matter and depends on it.

Non-reductive physicalists hold that everything is ultimately physical while insisting that higher-level psychological facts cannot be reduced to fundamental physics. According to this view, even a complete understanding of physics would not render sciences dedicated to higher levels, such as psychology, obsolete. For example, one suggestion frames mental states as psychological functions that are not limited to human brains or specific patterns of neural activation but can be realized by different physical substrates.

Similar discussions address the question of how or to what extent a shared social reality is grounded in the psychological activities of individuals. Social reality encompasses facts about institutions and norms, such as money, law, and language. According to one proposal, it is grounded in shared psychological attitudes as the members of a society collectively accept and act in accordance with these institutional rules and meanings, like when a piece of paper counts as money because of how people treat and use it.

=== Monism and pluralism ===
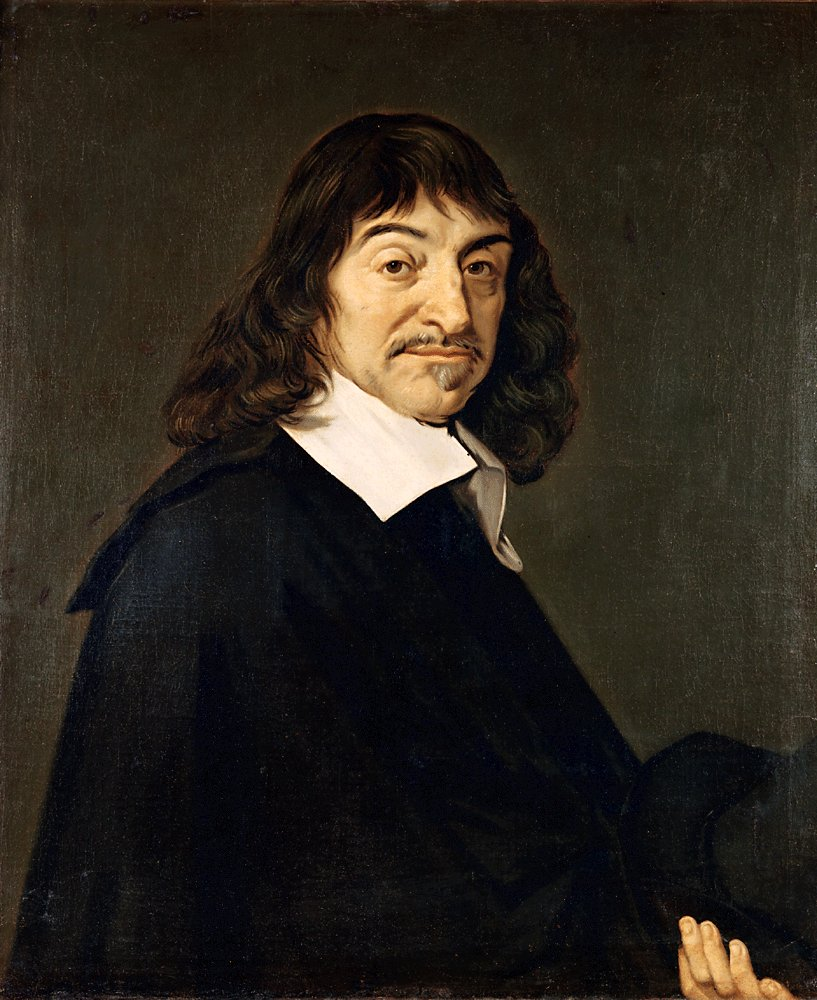
According to René Descartes's substance dualism, reality is made up of two kinds of entities: matter and mind.

Monism and pluralism are families of views about the roles of unity and multiplicity in the structure of reality. Existence monism holds that reality is ultimately composed of only a single concrete entity: the whole world is a single object, and all the individual entities encountered in everyday life, such as trees and animals, are not independent objects but merely features of the world-object or ways in which it appears. Existence monism contrasts with existence pluralism, which aligns more closely with everyday experience by asserting that reality is made up of many objects.

Another debate on the monism-pluralism spectrum concerns not the number of entities but the kinds to which these entities belong. Mind–body dualism is a form of pluralism asserting that mind and body are two fundamentally different kinds that make up reality. (Note: Substance dualists maintain that mind and body are distinct substances, while property dualists regard them as different properties of the same substance.) Monist views, by contrast, hold that everything belongs to the same kind. Idealist monism maintains that reality is essentially mental, whereas neutral monism proposes that reality is fundamentally neither physical nor mental but neutral. The dominant approach since the 20th century has been physicalist monism, which holds that everything is physical. Different versions of physicalism provide distinct accounts of the place and role of the mind in a purely physical reality. Eliminative physicalism denies the existence of mental entities, while reductive and non-reductive physicalism explain them in terms of physical processes. For example, behaviorism reduces mental concepts to observable behavior, and functionalism suggests a non-reductive account that identifies mental concepts with functional roles realizable by different systems.

=== Spacetime and laws of nature ===
Space and time are frameworks that structure reality by organizing how entities relate to one another. A classical understanding conceives them as distinct frameworks: space as a three-dimensional continuum in which entities are located, and time as a one-dimensional progression from the past, through the present, and into the future. In modern physics, general relativity regards them as a unified framework in which spatial and temporal dimensions are interwoven and measurements of space and time are influenced by the observer's motion. In philosophy, realists and idealists debate whether space and time exist independently of the human mind or are cognitive constructs that organize sensory experience. (Note: For example, Immanuel Kant held that space and time are subjective forms through which the mind organizes appearances. J. M. E. McTaggart argued that the concept of time involves contradictory elements and concluded that time is an illusion.) Absolutists and relationalists discuss whether spacetime is itself a distinct object, such as a huge container, or a network of relations between objects. Eternalism is the view that past, present, and future are equally real. It contrasts with the growing block universe theory, which claims that the future is not real, and with presentism, which holds that only the present is real.

The concept of causality describes relations between entities in spacetime. It links causes and effects as entities interact and influence each other, as when a thrown rock is the cause and a shattered window the effect. Causality is closely related to dispositions or powers, which are capacities of entities to change or bring about changes in other entities, such as flammability or electrical conductivity.

Laws of nature are uniformities or regularities in the structure of reality: they describe patterns of how entities interact and how changes unfold. For example, the laws of thermodynamics describe how heat and other forms of energy behave, such as the idea that the total amount of energy is always conserved. Laws of nature play a central role in the physical sciences by providing frameworks for predicting outcomes under specified conditions.

Causal determinism is the view that every event is fully determined or necessitated by prior events. According to this view, what happened in the past fixes what will happen in the future, including human behavior. It is controversial whether determinism is true and, if so, whether this implies that there is no free will. Some interpretations of quantum mechanics hold that measurement outcomes are inherently probabilistic, thereby rejecting causal determinism, but this is not true for all interpretations. (Note: Causal closure, a related idea, is a proposed principle stating that every physical event has a sufficient physical cause. It implies that no non-physical entities can have physical effects.)

Cosmological models describe the large-scale structure and dynamics of the universe. The widely accepted Big Bang theory holds that the universe began about 13.8 billion years ago, initially in an extremely hot, dense state, expanding and cooling ever since. Proposals for the long-term future of the universe vary. Some predict that the expansion will continue indefinitely. Others maintain that the expansion will eventually stop and reverse, resulting in a Big Crunch. Cyclic theories posit an endless sequence of expansions and contractions, with each Big Crunch leading to a new Big Bang.

== Realism and anti-realism ==
Realism and anti-realism are families of views concerning the mind-independence of reality. In the broadest sense, realism is the view that the external world and its constituents exist as they do regardless of how people perceive or think about them. In this sense, reality does not depend on human knowledge or consciousness and exists apart from them, including the aspects that no one is aware of.

Anti-realism rejects this view, arguing instead that there is no external world or that reality depends in certain respects on mental processes, subjective perspectives, or social conventions. For example, metaphysical idealism asserts that everything is essentially mental, for instance, by understanding material objects as ideas in the mind. Phenomenalism, a related view, reduces physical objects to collections of actual or possible sensory experiences. Relativism, another form of anti-realism, holds that what counts as real varies based on one's perspective or conceptual framework. Constructivism asserts that reality is constructed rather than discovered. Quietism takes a different approach by seeking to undermine the discussion between realism and anti-realism. It holds that the debate is not based on a substantive disagreement but arises instead from conceptual confusions.

Disputes between realism and anti-realism often focus on specific types of entities rather than reality as a whole, including discussions about whether universals, abstract objects, and values have mind-independent existence. In this sense, realism and anti-realism encompass many domain-specific positions across diverse fields. For example, a person may be a realist about universals and an anti-realist about values.

=== Universals ===
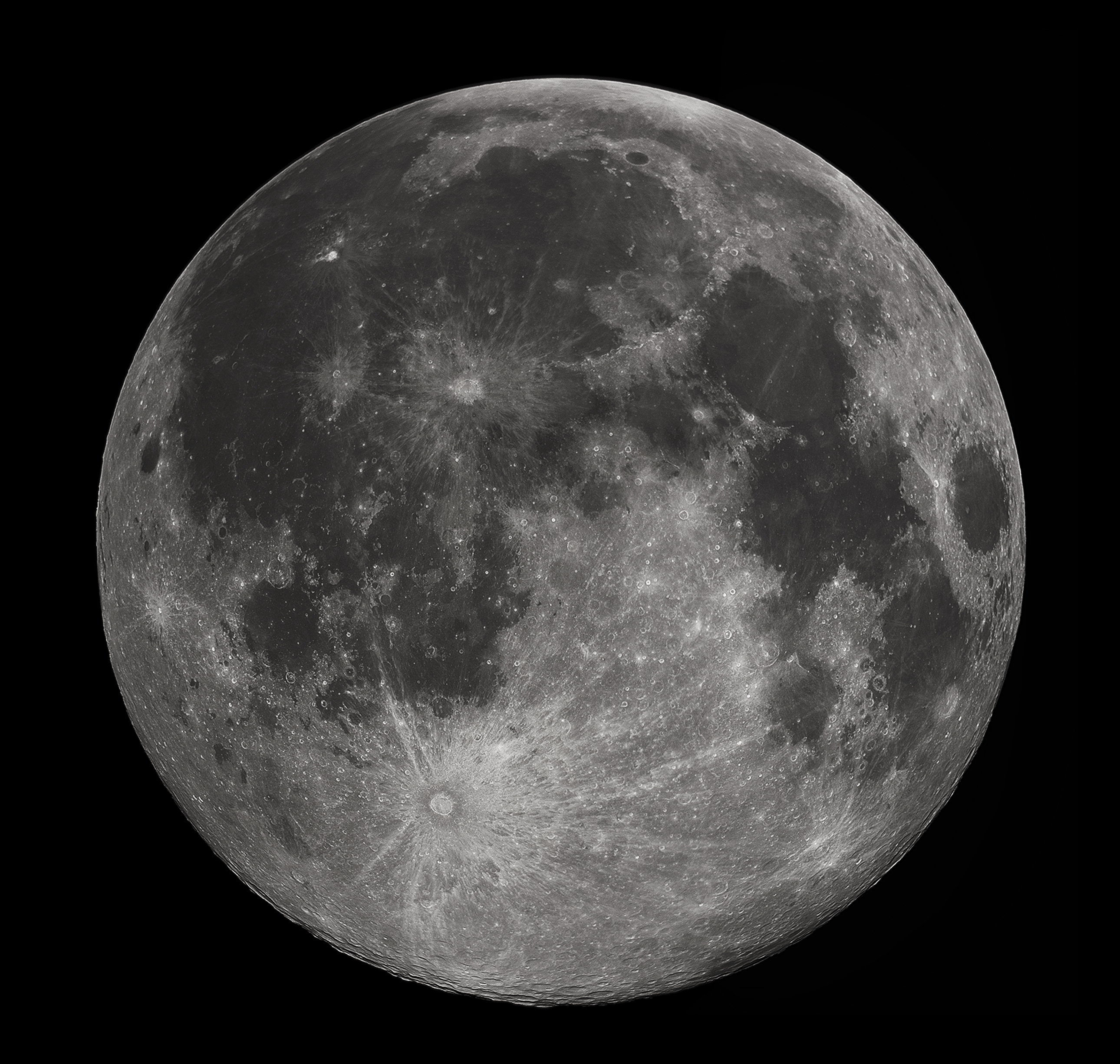
Realists and anti-realists debate whether universals, such as the color yellow, exist in addition to particulars, such as the Moon.

Realism about universals affirms the mind-independent existence of universal or general entities, such as the color yellow. Platonism about universals holds that they are part of reality in their own right, independent of the particular entities that instantiate them. This view maintains that there are not only individual yellow objects, such as bananas and sunflowers, but also the universal yellow itself, which, according to Plato, exists in a separate non-spatiotemporal realm of Forms. Moderate realism agrees that universals have mind-independent reality but denies their existence in a separate realm. Instead, it affirms that universals exist in their instances, meaning that there would be no universal yellow without any yellow objects to instantiate it.

Anti-realism about universals denies their mind-independent existence. According to conceptualism, universals exist in the mind as concepts through which people categorize and order their impressions, acting as tools of cognitive organization rather than properties of external entities. Nominalism, another anti-realist view, rejects both mental and non-mental interpretations of universals. It argues that there are only particulars, for example, by explaining apparent universals through words used to group entities or through resemblance among particulars.

=== Abstract objects ===
In the philosophy of mathematics, realism and anti-realism discuss whether mathematical objects, such as the number 7, have mind-independent reality.

Realists and anti-realists about abstract objects debate whether, or in what sense, such entities form part of reality. According to realism, abstract objects, such as numbers, sets, and mathematical functions, exist in their own right, in addition to concrete objects, such as flowers and cars. Realists often argue that everyday discourse and scientific language frequently refer to apparent abstract entities, suggesting that their existence is already assumed by these practices. (Note: This idea is central to indispensability arguments, which affirm the existence of abstract objects based on the claim that such entities are indispensable scientific explanations.) An influential challenge comes from their purported existence outside space, time, and causality, raising the question of how humans as concrete beings could know about such entities.

Anti-realists hold that there are no abstract objects and offer alternative explanations. Fictionalists argue that discourse about abstract objects concerns fictional entities within make-believe frameworks. It holds that this practice can be useful in some contexts without ascribing substantive or framework-independent reality to such entities. Another approach is to paraphrase sentences that seem to refer to abstract objects. This method seeks to show that apparent commitments to abstract objects can be eliminated and that the claims in question are ultimately only about concrete entities.

The problem of abstract objects is central to the philosophy of mathematics and the question of whether mathematical statements are about genuinely existing entities. Mathematical Platonism is a form of realism arguing that mathematical objects, like numbers, have mind-independent existence outside space and time. Anti-realism about abstract objects in mathematics takes various forms, including, but not limited to, fictionalism. For example, psychologism asserts that mathematical objects are mental constructions or ideas rather than abstract objects. According to conventionalism, the truth of mathematical statements rests on linguistic conventions or definitions, rather than on their relation to language-independent reality. Formalism, another form of anti-realism, understands mathematics as a practice of symbol manipulation, suggesting that mathematical truth is grounded in whether the manipulation rules permit the construction of a proof.

=== Values ===
Axiological realism and anti-realism discuss the ontological status of values. Some positions concern the existence of values in general, while others are limited to specific domains, such as moral, aesthetic, or religious values.

Realists hold that values are objective features of reality, meaning that there are mind-independent facts about whether something is good or bad, irrespective of subjective beliefs or personal preferences. Naturalism argues that values are part of the natural world and can be studied by the natural sciences through empirical observation. Non-naturalism, another form of realism, maintains that values differ significantly from empirical properties and belong to another domain of reality.

Anti-realist views reject the mind-independent existence of values and can take various forms. According to subjectivism, values depend on the attitudes and preferences of individuals. For example, emotivism holds that value statements express emotional attitudes of subjective approval or disapproval rather than objective facts. Error theory asserts that all value statements are false because there are no values. (Note: Related views include existential nihilism, which holds that the world has no objective meaning or purpose, and philosophical pessimism, which maintains that the world is inherently bad and that non-existence is preferable to existence.) Another form of anti-realism maintains that value statements are neither true nor false but meaningless.

=== Science ===
Scientific realism is the view that the best scientific theories provide an accurate description of a mind-independent world. It holds that the scientific view of the world is either exactly or at least approximately true by presenting reality as it is. This position is particularly relevant to the status of unobservable objects—entities that cannot be directly perceived but are nonetheless posited by scientific theories to explain observable phenomena. For example, dogs and chairs are observable since they can be directly perceived by human sensory organs under the right conditions, whereas electrons and wave functions are unobservable and inferred from indirect evidence. Accordingly, scientific realists argue that the unobservable entities posited by the best scientific theories are not mere fictions but correspond to genuine features of reality.

Structural realism is an influential version of scientific realism that modifies how the reality of unobservable entities is understood. It holds that scientific theories are only approximately true: they correctly describe the underlying relational structure of reality but may contain inaccuracies about the unobservable entities they posit. (Note: A key motivation for this approach is the observation that the descriptions of unobservable entities in past scientific theories have often been revised to accommodate new empirical findings, although they correctly predicted more general structural features of reality.)

Anti-realism questions the prospect of achieving a true description of a mind-independent world. For example, instrumentalism asserts that scientific theories are tools for making accurate predictions. On this view, unobservable entities may be invoked in theory construction to aid prediction but should not be taken to exist. Constructive empiricism, a closely related view, holds that scientific theories aim at empirical adequacy rather than full truth and may employ theoretical posits as long as they produce accurate descriptions of observable phenomena.

Local realism is a view that combines the principle of locality with the notion that there are definite physical properties, whether or not they are being observed by someone. The principle of locality is the idea that physical objects are influenced only by their immediate surroundings: there is no direct or instantaneous action at a distance; all interactions occur and propagate through local mechanisms. Various empirical findings in quantum physics challenge the combination of locality and realism, suggesting that observations are either influenced by non-local factors or depend on the act of measurement.

In the social sciences, critical realism holds that observable events in the social world only partially disclose reality. It asserts that they are the manifestations of unobservable but manipulable mechanisms, which are considered equally real.

=== Others ===
Modal realism is the view that possible worlds are as real as the actual world. On this view, reality is made up of countless concrete worlds existing in parallel without interacting with one another. The only thing distinguishing the actual world from other possible worlds is the observer's standpoint: the actual world is the observer's own world, while other possible worlds are inhabited by counterparts.

Speculative realism is a form of realism in continental philosophy. It opposes the idea that world and mind are essentially correlated, emphasizing the mind-independent nature of reality beyond the way humans perceive and think about it.

A semantic approach to the debate between realism and anti-realism, proposed by Michael Dummett, argues that the underlying disagreement concerns the meaning of statements rather than the existence of entities. It characterizes realism as the view that the truth or meaning of sentences is determined by external standards or mind-independent reality. Anti-realism is understood as a view that identifies the meaning of a statement with the evidence that would support it or the conditions under which a person is justified in asserting it. Dummett concludes that, according to realism, a sentence is either true or false, while according to anti-realism, there is a third option for undecidable sentences that can be neither verified nor falsified.

== Knowledge ==
Knowledge is an awareness or familiarity that shapes how individuals understand and engage with reality. It is a successful cognitive contact with reality, often associated with an accurate grasp of how things are and with having good reasons or justification for one's perspective.

Philosophers discuss various sources of knowledge as ways of how this cognitive contact is established, including perception, introspection, reason, memory, and testimony. Perception relies on sensory organs to acquire empirical information about the world, including vision and hearing. Introspection is an internal awareness of one's own mental states. Reason is the ability to draw logical inferences and arrive at truths independent of immediate sensory input. Memory is the capacity to store information from other sources and make it available to cognitive processes when needed. Testimony is a transmission of knowledge from one person to another through communication. (Note: Testimony plays a central role in social epistemology, which investigates how social processes shape the acquisition, transmission, and evaluation of knowledge within groups.)

The scientific method is a rigorous approach to arrive at scientific knowledge. It involves the formulation of a hypothesis to explain a phenomenon and then testing it with empirical evidence from controlled experiments or observation. A central aspect is replicability: procedures should be documented so that other researchers can reproduce the investigation to verify or refute the original findings.

Direct and indirect realism are different ways of understanding the relation between the objects in perceptual experience and the physical objects causing them. According to direct realism, there is no essential difference: the experienced objects are the real objects, implying a direct connection between perception and reality. A challenge for direct realism comes from erroneous perceptions, such as illusions, in which experienced entities do not correspond to real ones. Indirect realism seeks to resolve this problem by distinguishing between the mental entities involved in perception and the physical entities that cause them. On this view, the connection is indirect: entities such as ideas or sense data exist as part of experience and represent or point to mind-independent objects. Indirect realism faces the challenge of explaining how a true contact with reality is possible if people only perceive an internal veil of ideas or sense data, which stands between the subject and external reality.

=== Limits and objectivity ===
Philosophers examine various limitations of knowledge or obstacles to the cognitive contact with reality. Some are situation-specific, involving information that is inaccessible. For example, certain facts about the past may be unknowable today because they left no traces, such as facts about what Caesar had for breakfast on the day he was assassinated. More general constraints arise from limits of human cognitive faculties rather than situation-specific circumstances, such as facts too complex for anyone to conceive. These limitations indicate a gap whereby reality is not fully captured and exceeds knowledge.

Another issue concerns the possibility of objectivity. For example, judgments based on measurements are typically considered objective, such as the claim that the temperature is 20°C, whereas evaluative personal assessments are often regarded as subjective, such as the claims that this temperature is chilly or pleasant. One approach, first formulated by John Locke, distinguishes between objective primary qualities and subjective secondary qualities. According to this view, primary qualities, like size and shape, are real features of objects themselves, while secondary qualities, like colors and smells, are experiences caused by primary features but exist only in the perceiver's mind. A different approach, inspired by Kantian philosophy, holds that all experienced phenomena are shaped by the innate structures of human cognition and cannot grasp the objective nature of the things in themselves. Defenders of objective knowledge often point to areas where there is broad intersubjective agreement among observers. Some interpretations of quantum mechanics question the objectivity of measurements on the microscopic scale. They assert that observations of quantum phenomena are influenced by measurement processes, challenging the idea of observer-independent knowledge.

==== Skepticism ====
The brain-in-a-vat thought experiment considers the possibility that all experiences are artificially generated through electrical brain stimulation, challenging the idea that people can know reality.

Skepticism is a family of views that question the possibility of knowledge. Some forms target specific domains of knowledge, such as religious skepticism, which denies that beliefs about God or other religious doctrines amount to knowledge. Moral skepticism is the view that there is no moral knowledge, for instance, that one cannot know whether a given behavior is morally right or wrong. Skepticism about metaphysics holds that it is not possible to know the fundamental nature of reality, such as claims about categories of being or the existence of universals.

Radical or global skepticism is the most far-reaching form of skepticism. It denies the existence of knowledge in any form or domain, arguing that knowledge is impossible. Although it is not a widely accepted position, various thought experiments undermining the reliability of human cognitive faculties are discussed in the academic literature. The dream argument asserts that a person can never be fully certain they are not currently dreaming, casting general doubt on the ability to distinguish reality from illusion at any moment. Similar ideas are explored in brain-in-a-vat scenarios, which consider the possibility that all experiences are artificially generated through electrical brain stimulation, and in the evil demon thought experiment, which imagines a god-like being able to intrude on a person's inner life to deceive them at every turn.

=== Augmented and virtual reality ===
While some skeptical scenarios use the idea of a simulated reality to challenge the reliability of human cognition, contemporary technologies such as augmented reality and virtual reality can also inform experience. Augmented reality encompasses devices that overlay digital information onto the physical world in real time. For example, it can take the form of wearable glasses that project navigational cues or contextual information into the field of vision. Virtual reality is further removed from the physical environment, immersing the user in a simulated setting, such as a video game world or a training simulation. (Note: The term real life is commonly used to distinguish events in the physical world from those in virtual or fictional settings.)

Reality–virtuality continuum

The reality–virtuality continuum is a theoretical framework that posits a continuous scale of mixed reality forms. For example, augmented reality devices may provide only sparse cues or overlay dense layers of digital content. Similarly, virtual reality worlds may incorporate real-world objects into the simulation or be entirely virtual. (Note: In post-modern philosophy, the term hyperreality, coined by Jean Baudrillard, describes situations in which the distinction between reality and its representations breaks down, for example, because imitations acquire more legitimacy than the originals.)

Various philosophical problems are associated with the ontological status of virtual objects, such as a magic sword found inside a video game world. One perspective holds that such objects are illusory or unreal because they lack existence in the physical world outside the simulation. Another view maintains that they are real as digital objects with genuine existence and causal powers, residing within and being constituted by computational processes.

=== Worldviews and theories of everything ===
A worldview is a comprehensive framework for understanding reality and humanity's place within it. It comprises beliefs, ideas, and attitudes that form a background against which people interpret experiences, make decisions, and navigate life. Accordingly, worldviews address not only theoretical matters but also practical and evaluative outlooks about what matters and how one should act. Different worldviews offer distinct answers to existential questions about meaning, morality, and the nature of reality, such as the contrast between religious and secular worldviews.

A theory of everything is a comprehensive explanatory scheme that integrates all knowledge into a consistent theoretical framework. Such theories aim at a unified explanation rather than a collection of isolated facts, for example, by identifying a limited number of basic constituents, categories, or principles as an explanatory basis of all phenomena. Philosophical theories of everything consider a wide range of phenomena from diverse domains, including the nature of matter and mind, mathematical truths, free will, moral obligations, and values. A key idea underlying this approach is to study the unrestricted whole by overcoming the boundaries of the restricted domains of other fields of inquiry, such as physics and psychology. In physics, the term theory of everything has a more specific meaning, denoting a framework that unifies quantum physics with the theory of relativity. The theory of relativity describes macroscopic reality and the nature of gravitation, while quantum physics describes microscopic reality and all known fundamental interactions except gravitation. Unification is required for areas where both domains overlap, such as black holes, for which strong gravitational fields influence quantum behavior.

== In various fields ==
The concept of reality is relevant to many fields. In philosophy, metaphysics and ontology study its nature and fundamental structure. They examine what it means for something to be real, how entities are divided into different categories of being, and which entities exist at the most fundamental level.

The philosophy of language examines how linguistic entities, such as the term apple, can establish contact with reality by successfully referring to things in the world.

Epistemology, another philosophical subdiscipline, explores how people can know reality. It investigates what knowledge is, how it originates, and what can or cannot be known. Phenomenology analyzes the subjective structure of consciousness. It focuses on how individuals experience reality and how conscious states are intentional or directed towards entities other than themselves. The problem of reference is a similar topic in philosophy of mind and philosophy of language. It concerns the question of how mental and linguistic entities, such as thoughts and words, can establish contact with reality by successfully referring to things in the world. Various other subfields of philosophy examine specific domains of reality. For example, value theory is concerned with the reality of values, and the philosophy of mathematics explores in what sense mathematical objects, like numbers and sets, form part of reality.

In the sciences, physics studies the physical world and encompasses a broad range of phenomena. At the subatomic scale, particle physics focuses on elementary particles and their interactions. At the astronomical scale, cosmology analyzes the origin, structure, and development of the universe as a whole.

Psychology examines how individuals perceive, interpret, and respond to reality, including how mental processes construct models of reality and how illusions and biases distort understanding. It overlaps with the cognitive sciences, which investigate how cognitive processes transform information about the world, and with neuroscience, which studies the brain activities underlying such processes. In psychoanalytic theory, the reality principle is a proposed mechanism that counteracts the pleasure principle, delaying immediate gratification when it collides with the demands of external reality. Reality testing is another suggested psychological function in which individuals distinguish intrapsychic from external events to assess how their experience aligns with reality.

Computer scientists discuss how systems of knowledge representation can organize information about reality and make it accessible to computational processes. Such data may be used in Computer simulations to model real-world phenomena and predict outcomes. The simulation hypothesis is the view that the whole world and everything within it is a simulated reality, including humans. A related idea holds that information is the fundamental substance of reality.

Anthropology examines diverse ways of life, including the question of how distinct cultures interpret reality. One strand of the field analyzes culture-specific worldviews and compares them across societies. Religion and theology are interested in the nature and existence of God or the divine. Some doctrines hold that God constitutes the most fundamental level of reality as the divine origin of all creation.

History studies historical reality primarily associated with the human past. Various historiographical debates address the question of whether a truly objective account of the past is possible. In art history, various styles address the problem of reality, including realism, which seeks accurate representation of its subject matter, and surrealism, which employs unexpected symbolism and irrational connections to reveal deeper layers associated with the unconscious mind and dreams.

== History ==
Various theories of the nature of reality originated in antiquity. Beginning in the first millennium BCE in Indian philosophy, the Upanishads conceived Brahman as the supreme being and the source of all existence. The school of Vaisheshika arose roughly in the 2nd century BCE and developed a system of six fundamental categories of being. Samkhya, another school of Hindu philosophy systematically formulated around 350 CE, proposed a dualistic framework, describing reality as the interplay of two principles: pure consciousness and matter. In the Chinese tradition, Taoist thought emerged roughly in the 6th century BCE and understood the Tao as the all-pervasive, ineffable source of all reality.

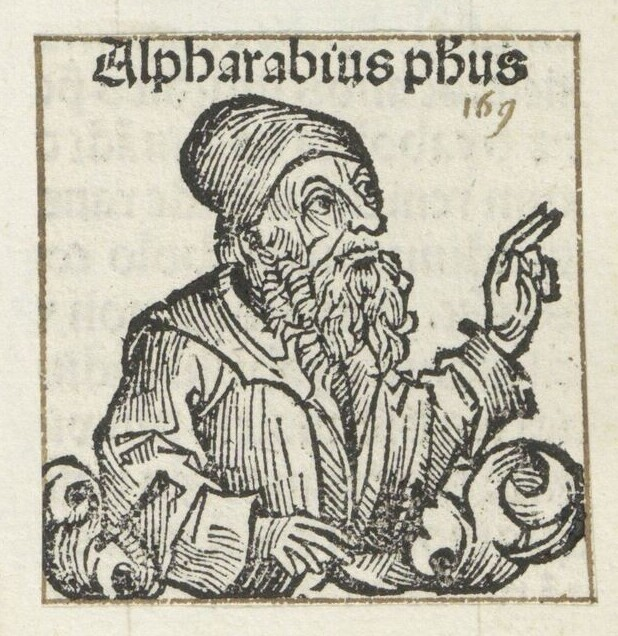
Various medieval thinkers, such as Al-Farabi, held that God is the ground of all existence.

In ancient Greek philosophy starting in the 6th century BCE, the pre-Socratics discussed the first principles from which all things arise. Leucippus (fl. 5th century BCE) and his student Democritus (c. 460 – c. 370 BCE) held that reality is fundamentally composed of indivisible units, which they termed atoms. Plato (c. 427 – c. 347 BCE) argued for the existence of a realm of eternal forms or ideas in addition to the material world of mutable entities. His student Aristotle (384–322 BCE) proposed a system of ten categories describing the fundamental constituents of reality. Inspired by Plato's realm of forms, Plotinus (c. 204 – c. 270 CE) identified the One as the supreme principle underlying all of reality.

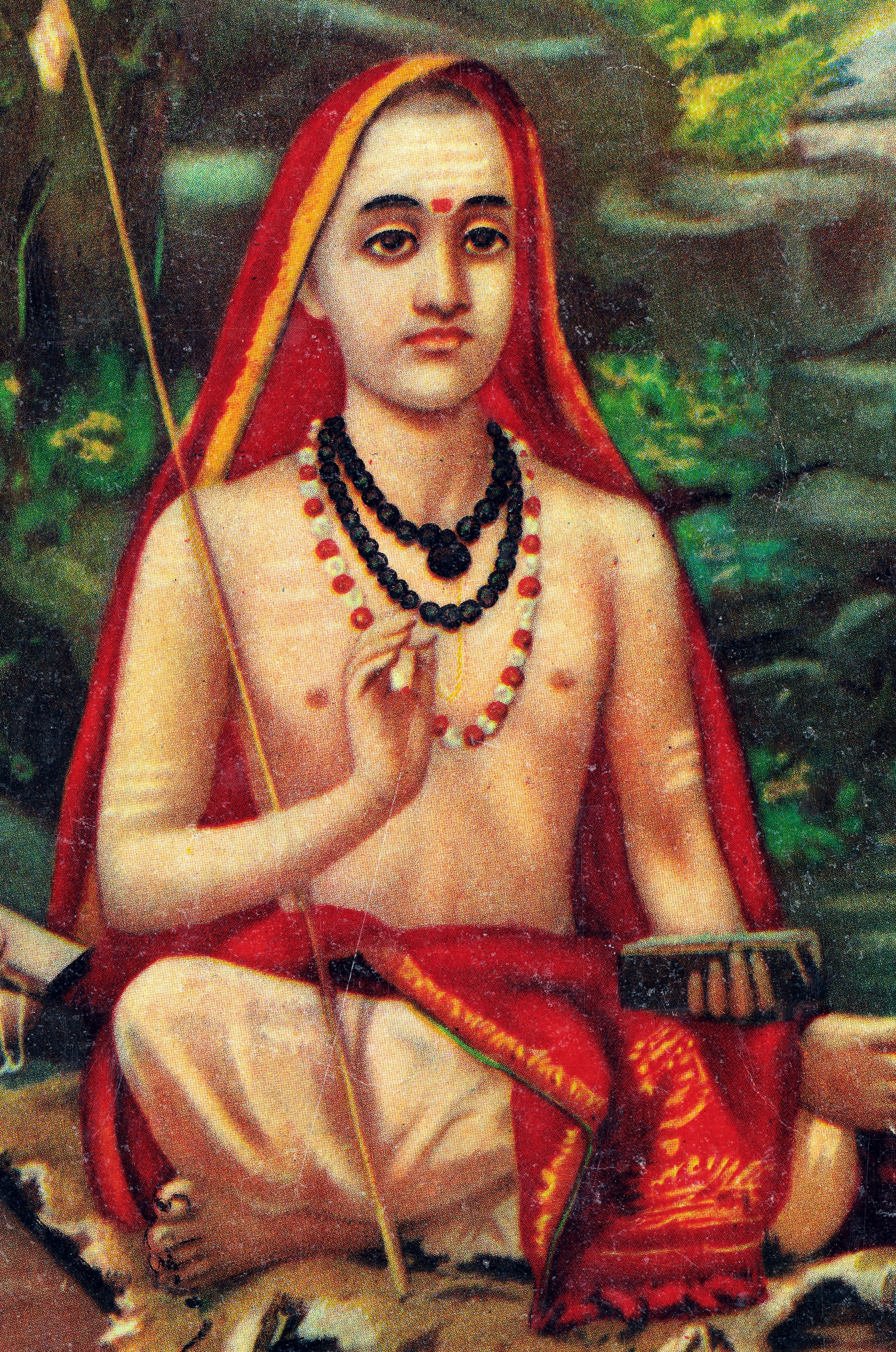
The school of Advaita Vedanta, as developed by Adi Shankara, holds that the world of everyday appearances is an illusion and that only the underlying Brahman has absolute reality.

During the medieval period, many thinkers understood God as the most fundamental reality and the source of all creation. Variations of this idea are found in the Christian tradition, proposed by philosophers such as Augustine of Hippo (354–430) and Thomas Aquinas (1225–1274), and in the Islamic tradition, explored by thinkers such as Al-Farabi (c. 870 – c. 950) and Avicenna (980–1037). Another central topic in this period was the problem of universals, with realists, conceptualists, and nominalists discussing whether universals exist as mind-independent entities, as mental entities, or not at all. In Hindu philosophy, the school of Advaita Vedanta emerged in the 8th century and held that the world of everyday appearances is an illusion, contrasting it with the ultimate reality of Brahman. In China, beginning roughly in the 9th century, Neo-Confucianism maintained that reality has a rational order expressed in the principle Li, which acts as a ground of being.

In early modern philosophy, René Descartes (1596–1650) proposed substance dualism, arguing that reality is made up of two kinds of entities: matter and mind. Baruch Spinoza (1632–1677) rejected Descartes's dualism, holding instead that the world consists of a single entity, which he called "God or nature". Gottfried Wilhelm Leibniz (1646–1716) examined the relation between reality and possibility, suggesting that possible worlds are ideas in God's mind, while only the actual world is realized, chosen by God as the best possible world. Analyzing human experience, John Locke (1632–1704) distinguished primary from secondary qualities and argued that only primary qualities correspond to objective features of reality. In his classical mechanics, Isaac Newton (1643–1727) conceived the universe as a deterministic system governed by universal laws of motion. George Berkeley (1685–1753) developed a comprehensive form of subjective idealism, asserting that objects exist only as ideas in minds, expressed in his slogan "to be is to be perceived".

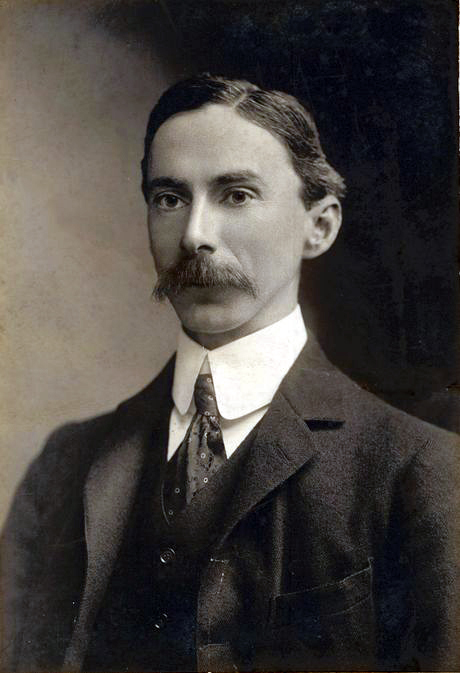
In his logical atomism, Bertrand Russell conceived reality as a multitude of basic facts.

Immanuel Kant (1724–1804) rejected the possibility of objective knowledge of the things in themselves, arguing instead that all experience is shaped by the innate structures of human cognition. Responding to Kant's philosophy, the German idealists sought a unifying principle as the foundation of all reality. A similar outlook was adopted by Francis Herbert Bradley (1846–1924), who conceived the absolute as the all-inclusive totality of being. By contrast, Arthur Schopenhauer (1788–1860) criticized German idealism and held that a blind, irrational will is the underlying principle of reality.

At the beginning of the 20th century, Bertrand Russell (1872–1970) and G. E. Moore (1873–1958) drew on common sense and empirical science to oppose idealism, emphasizing that the world exists independently of the mind. Alongside his student Ludwig Wittgenstein (1889–1951), Russell developed logical atomism, which characterizes reality as a multitude of basic facts. Alfred North Whitehead (1861–1947) advanced a different outlook that frames reality as an organic whole made up of processes.

Alexius Meinong (1853–1920) maintained that the concept of being is broader than the concept of reality since it includes non-existent entities, such as merely possible and incomplete objects. Influenced by Kant, Edmund Husserl (1859–1938) argued that reality is tied to consciousness as an intersubjective correlate of experience that cannot be reduced to a wholly mind-independent substrate. Nicolai Hartmann (1882–1950) proposed a hierarchical model of reality, dividing the world into four levels: the inanimate, the biological, the psychological, and the spiritual. Inspired by Leibniz, David Lewis (1941–2001) developed modal realism, maintaining that possible worlds are as real as the actual world.

In physics, Albert Einstein (1879–1955) developed the theory of relativity, which treats space and time as interwoven dimensions whose geometry is curved by matter and energy. Quantum mechanics originated in the works of Niels Bohr (1885–1962), Werner Heisenberg (1901–1976), and Erwin Schrödinger (1887–1961). It revolutionized the scientific understanding of microscopic reality, revealing that particles can exhibit wave-like behavior, that certain physical quantities, like energy, take only discrete values rather than a continuous range, and that measurement outcomes are inherently probabilistic. In the course of 20th-century philosophy of science, scientific realism gained prominence, arguing that the best scientific theories provide an accurate description of a mind-independent world.
