= Unobservable =

Entity not directly observable by humans

An unobservable (also called impalpable) is an entity whose existence, nature, properties, qualities or relations are not directly observable by humans. In philosophy of science, typical examples of "unobservables" are the force of gravity, causation and beliefs or desires. The distinction between observable and unobservable plays a central role in Immanuel Kant's distinction between noumena and phenomena as well as in John Locke's distinction between primary and secondary qualities. There is considerable disagreement about which objects should be classified as unobservable, for example, whether bacteria studied using microscopes or positrons studied using cloud chambers count as unobservable. Different notions of unobservability have been formulated corresponding to different types of obstacles to their observation.

== Kant on noumena ==
The distinction between "observable" and "unobservable" is similar to Immanuel Kant's distinction between noumena and phenomena. Noumena are the things-in-themselves, i.e., raw things in their necessarily unknowable state, before they pass through the formalizing apparatus of the senses and the mind in order to become perceived objects, which he refers to as "phenomena". According to Kant, humans can never know noumena; all that humans know is the phenomena.

== Locke on primary and secondary qualities ==
Kant's distinction is similar to John Locke's distinction between primary and secondary qualities. Secondary qualities are what humans perceive such as redness, chirping, heat, mustiness or sweetness. Primary qualities would be the actual qualities of the things themselves which give rise to the secondary qualities which humans perceive.

== Philosophy of science ==
The ontological nature and epistemological issues concerning unobservables are central topics in philosophy of science. The theory that unobservables posited by scientific theories exist is referred to as scientific realism. It contrasts with instrumentalism, which asserts that we should withhold ontological commitments to unobservables even though it is useful for scientific theories to refer to them.

The notion of observability plays a central role in constructive empiricism. According to Bas van Fraassen, the goal of scientific theories is not truth about all entities but only truth about all observable entities. If a theory is true in this restricted sense, it is called an empirically adequate theory. Van Fraassen characterizes observability counterfactually: "X is observable if there are circumstances which are such that, if X is present to us under those circumstances, then we observe it".

A problem with this and similar characterizations is to determine the exact extension of what is unobservable. There is little controversy that regular everyday objects that we can perceive without any aids are observable. Such objects include, for example, trees, chairs, or dogs. But controversy starts with cases where unaided perception fails. These include using telescopes to study distant galaxies, using microscopes to study bacteria, or using cloud chambers to study positrons.

Some philosophers have been motivated by these and similar examples to question the value of the distinction between observable and unobservable in general.

== Kinds of unobservables ==
W. V. Metcalf distinguishes three kinds of unobservables. One is the logically unobservable, which involves a contradiction. An example would be a length which is both longer and shorter than a given length. The second is the practically unobservable, that which we can conceive of as observable by the known sense-faculties of man but we are prevented from observing by practical difficulties. The third kind is the physically unobservable, that which can never be observed by any existing sense-faculties of man.

== See also ==
- Banach–Tarski paradox
- Empiricism
- Future
- Hidden-variable theory
- If a tree falls in a forest
- Logical positivism
- Object of the mind
- Phenomenology
- Proxy (statistics), for an unobservable variable
- Rationalism
- Unobservable chaos
- Unphysical
