= Maurice Mandelbaum =

American philosopher

Maurice Mandelbaum (December 9, 1908, Chicago – January 1, 1987, Hanover, New Hampshire) was an American philosopher and phenomenologist. He was professor of philosophy at Johns Hopkins University with stints at Dartmouth College and Swarthmore College. He held two degrees from Dartmouth and a PhD from Yale University. He was known for his work in phenomenology, epistemology, philosophy of perception (especially critical realism), and the history of ideas.

== Works ==
He wrote many books, including:

- The Problem of Historical Knowledge, 1938
- The Phenomenology of Moral Experience, 1955
- Philosophy, Science and Sense Perception, 1964
- History, Man, and Reason: A study in Nineteenth Century Thought, 1971
- The Anatomy of Historical Knowledge, 1977
- Philosophy, History, and the Sciences, 1984
