= Jenann Ismael =

American philosopher

- Born: 1968 (age 57–58)

Education
- Education: Reed College; Princeton University
- Thesis: Essays on symmetry (1997)
- Doctoral advisor: Bas van Fraassen

Philosophical work
- Institutions: University of Arizona; Columbia University; Johns Hopkins University
- Main interests: Metaphysics philosophy of physics

Jenann Tareq Ismael (born 1968) is a professor of philosophy at Johns Hopkins University and a member of the Foundational Questions Institute (FQXi.) Ismael's work has been influential in the scholarship of metaphysics and the philosophy of physics.

== Education and career ==
Ismael earned her M.A. and PhD from Princeton University in 1994 and 1997, where her dissertation advisor was Bas van Fraassen. In 1996, she was awarded a two-year Mellon Postdoctoral Fellowship. In 2003, she was awarded an NEH Research fellowship at the National Humanities Center. Ismael worked at Stanford University from 1996 to 1998, and at University of Arizona from 1998 to the present, taking a 5-year leave from 2005–2010 to be a senior research associate at the Centre for Time at the University of Sydney after the Australian Research Council awarded her a five-year-long Queen Elizabeth II research fellowship. In 2011 Ismael was awarded a Big Questions in Free Will Grant from the Templeton Foundation. In 2012 she was awarded a Scholarly Conversation Grant from the National Humanities Center. She spent 2014-2015 as a fellow at Stanford's Center for the Advanced Study in the Behavioral Sciences.

== Philosophical work ==
Ismael's research focuses on the philosophy of physics and metaphysics, especially areas involving the structure of space and time, quantum mechanics, and the foundations of physical laws. She has also published on such issues as the conflict between lived experience and physics, the implications of physics on issues of freedom, death, the nature of the self, and the problem of free will.

Ismael has published four books: Essays on Symmetry in 2001, The Situated Self in 2007 (with a second edition released in 2009,), How Physics Makes Us Free in 2016 and Time: A Very Short Introduction in 2021 as well as a number of peer-reviewed papers.

=== Essays on Symmetry (2001) ===
In Essays on Symmetry Ismael aims to draw connections between the concept of symmetry as it is used in philosophy and the concept of symmetry as it is used in physics.

=== The Situated Self (2007) ===
In The Situated Self, Ismael presents a naturalistic account of the self, focusing on the construction of internal models that represent the external world, and attempting to explain the relationship between the self and the outside world. The book has three distinct parts: the first part deals primarily with reflexive representation and its uses, the second part applies the idea of reflexive representation to famous problems of the philosophy of mind, and the third attempts to lay out a new conception of what the self is.

=== Causation, Free Will and Naturalism (paper 2012) ===
In this paper, Ismael addresses the question of free will from a physics perspective, reconciling the "happy confidence in one's own powers to bring things about" and "recent developments in the scientific understanding of causal concepts." From the broad scientific perspective, dynamical laws seem to preclude not only most folk notions of free will, but the very concept of causality in general. However "interventionist account" of causality, independently developed by Clark Glymour and Judea Pearl, makes sense of considering the impacts of our human behavior on the system. "We need causal information to decide how to act..."

=== How Physics Makes Us Free (2016) ===
Her book How Physics Makes Us Free was selected by John Farrell of Forbes Magazine as 2016 Book of the Year.

== Bibliography ==
- Essays on Symmetry (2001)
- The Situated Self (2007)
- How Physics Makes Us Free (2016)
- Time: A Very Short Introduction (2021)
