= Edward J. Hall =

American philosopher

- Born: Edward Jonathan Hall; 1966 (age 59–60)

Education
- Academic advisor: David Lewis

Philosophical work
- Era: Contemporary philosophy
- Region: Western philosophy
- School: Analytic
- Main interests: Philosophy of science, metaphysics

Edward Jonathan Hall (born 1966), also known as Ned Hall, is an American philosopher and Norman E. Vuilleumier Professor of Philosophy at Harvard University. He is known for his expertise on metaphysics, philosophy of science, and epistemology.

== Education and career ==
Hall graduated from Reed College in 1987, and earned his Ph.D. in philosophy at Princeton University in 1996. He taught at MIT until 2005, when he moved to Harvard.

== Books ==
- 2014. The Philosophy of Science: Metaphysical and Epistemological Foundations (Fundamentals of Philosophy), Blackwell, 2014
- 2004. Causation and Counterfactuals. Co-edited with L.A. Paul and John Collins. MIT Press, ISBN 978-0-26253-2563.
- 2013. Causation: A User's Guide. with L.A. Paul. Oxford University Press, ISBN 978-0-19-967345-2.

== See also ==
- Counterfactuals
- Causality
