= Critical realism (philosophy of perception) =

Theory that some of our sense-data can accurately represent external objects

In the philosophy of perception, critical realism (also critical perceptual realism) is the theory that some of our sense-data (for example, those of primary qualities) can and do accurately represent external objects, properties, and events, while other of our sense-data (for example, those of secondary qualities and perceptual illusions) do not accurately represent any external objects, properties, and events. Put simply, critical realism highlights a mind-dependent aspect of the world that reaches to understand (and comes to an understanding of) the mind-independent world.

== Precursor theories ==
According to 17th-century philosopher John Locke—following a tradition which can be traced back to the ancient (Democritus) and modern (Galileo Galilei, Isaac Newton) atomism—some sense-data, namely the sense-data of secondary qualities (i.e. colours, tastes, smells, sounds), do not represent anything in the external world, even if they are caused by external qualities (primary qualities). By its talk of sense-data and representation, this theory depends on or presupposes the truth of representational realism.

== American critical realism ==
The 20th-century American critical realist movement was a response both to direct realism, as well as to idealism and pragmatism. In very broad terms, American critical realism was a form of representative realism, in which there are objects that stand as mediators between independent real objects and perceivers. Prominent developers of American critical realism are Roy Wood Sellars and his son Wilfrid Sellars, and Maurice Mandelbaum.

One innovation was that these mediators are not ideas (British empiricism), but properties, essences, or "character complexes".

== British critical realism ==
Similar developments occurred in 20th-century Britain. Major figures included C. D. Broad and H. H. Price.

== German critical realism ==
Alois Riehl was a founding figure of critical realism within 19th-century German neo-Kantianism. Nicolai Hartmann renewed the interest in the critical realist theory in 20th-century Germany.

== See also ==
- Anti-realism
- Critical realism (philosophy of the social sciences)
- New realism (philosophy)
- Subtle realism
