= Ramsey sentence =

Construct in the philosophy of science

Ramsey sentences are formal logical reconstructions of theoretical propositions attempting to draw a line between science and metaphysics. A Ramsey sentence aims at rendering propositions containing non-observable theoretical terms (terms employed by a theoretical language) clear by substituting them with observational terms (terms employed by an observation language, also called empirical language).

Ramsey sentences were introduced by the logical empiricist philosopher Rudolf Carnap. However, they should not be confused with Carnap sentences, which are neutral on whether there exists anything to which the term applies.

== Scientific (real) questions vs. metaphysical (pseudo-)questions ==
For Carnap, questions such as “Are electrons real?” and “Can you prove electrons are real?” were not legitimate questions, nor did they contain any great philosophical or metaphysical truths. Rather, they were meaningless "pseudo-questions without cognitive content,” asked from outside a language framework of science. Inside this framework, entities such as electrons or sound waves, and relations such as mass and force not only exist and have meaning but are "useful" to the scientists who work with them. To accommodate such internal questions in a way that would justify their theoretical content empirically – and to do so while maintaining a distinction between analytic and synthetic propositions – Carnap set out to develop a systematized way to consolidate theory and empirical observation in a meaningful language formula.

== Observable vs. non-observable ==
Carnap began by differentiating observable things from non-observable things. Immediately, a problem arises: neither the German nor the English language naturally distinguish predicate terms on the basis of an observational categorization. As Carnap admitted, "The line separating observable from non-observable is highly arbitrary." For example, the predicate "hot" can be perceived by touching a hand to a lighted coal. But "hot" might take place at such a microlevel (as an example, the theoretical "heat" generated by the production of proteins in a eukaryotic cell) that it is virtually non-observable (at present). Physicist-philosopher Moritz Schlick characterized the difference linguistically, as the difference between the German verbs kennen (knowing as being acquainted with a thing – perception) and erkennen (knowing as understanding a thing – even if non-observable). This linguistic distinction may explain Carnap's decision to divide the vocabulary into two artificial categories: a vocabulary of non-observable ("theoretical") terms (hereafter "V_{T}"), which are terms we know of but are not acquainted with (erkennen); and a vocabulary of observable terms ("V_{O}"), those terms we are acquainted with (kennen) and will accept arbitrarily. Accordingly, the terms thus distinguished were incorporated into comparable sentence structures: T-terms into theoretical sentences (T-sentences); O-terms into observational sentences (O-sentences).

The next step for Carnap was to connect these separate concepts by what he calls "correspondence rules" (C-rules), which are "mixed" sentences containing both T- and O-terms. Such a theory can be formulated as: T + C = df: the conjunction of T-postulates + the conjunction of C-rules – i.e., $[(T_1 \land T_2 \land \cdots \land T_n ) + ( C_1 \land C_2 \land \cdots \land C_m )]$. This can be further expanded to include class terms such as for the class of all molecules, relations such as "betweenness," and predicates: for example, TC ( t_{1}, t_{2}, . . ., t_{n}, o_{1}, o_{2}, . . ., o_{m}). Though this enabled Carnap to establish what it means for a theory to be "empirical," this sentence neither defines the T-terms explicitly nor draws any distinction between its analytic and its synthetic content, therefore it was not yet sufficient for Carnap's purposes.

In the theories of Frank P. Ramsey, Carnap found the method he needed to take the next step, which was to substitute variables for each T-term, then to quantify existentially all T-terms in both T-sentences and C-rules. The resulting "Ramsey sentence" effectively eliminated the T-terms as such, while still providing an account of the theory's empirical content. The evolution of the formula proceeds thus:

Step 1 (empirical theory, assumed true): TC ( t_{1} . . . t_{n}, o_{1} . . . o_{m})
Step 2 (substitution of variables for T-terms): TC (x_{1} . . . x_{n}, o_{1} . . . o_{m})
Step 3 ($\exists$-quantification of the variables): $\exists x_1 \ldots \exists x_n TC ( x_1 \ldots x_n, o_1 \ldots o_m)$.

Step 3 is the complete Ramsey sentence, expressed "^{R}TC," and to be read: "There are some (unspecified) relations such that TC (x_{1} . . . x_{n}, o_{1} . . . o_{m}) is satisfied when the variables are assigned these relations. (This is equivalent to an interpretation as an appropriate model: there are relations r_{1} . . . r_{n} such that TC (x_{1} . . . x_{n}, o_{1} . . . o_{m}) is satisfied when x_{i} is assigned the value r_{i}, and $1 \leq i \leq m$.)

In this form, the Ramsey sentence captures the factual content of the theory. Though Ramsey believed this formulation was adequate to the needs of science, Carnap disagreed, with regard to a comprehensive reconstruction. In order to delineate a distinction between analytic and synthetic content, Carnap thought the reconstructed sentence would have to satisfy three desired requirements:

1. The factual (F_{T}) component must be observationally equivalent to the original theory (TC).
2. The analytic (A_{T}) component must be observationally uninformative.
3. The combination of F_{T} and A_{T} must be logically equivalent to the original theory – that is, $F_T + A_T \Leftrightarrow TC$.

Requirement 1 is satisfied by ^{R}TC in that the existential quantification of the T-terms does not change the logical truth (L-truth) of either statement, and the reconstruction FT has the same O-sentences as the theory itself, hence ^{R}TC is observationally equivalent to TC : (in other words, for every O-sentence: O, $[TC \models O \Leftrightarrow ^{R}TC \models O]$ ). As stated, however, requirements 2 and 3 remain unsatisfied. That is, taken individually, A_{T} does contain observational information (such-and-such a theoretical entity is observed to do such-and-such, or hold such-and-such a relation); and A_{T} does not necessarily follow from F_{T}.

Carnap's solution is to make the two statements conditional. If there are some relations such that [TC (x1 . . . xn, o1 . . . om)] is satisfied when the variables are assigned some relations, then the relations assigned to those variables by the original theory will satisfy [TC (t1 . . . tn, o1 . . . om)] – or: ^{R}TC → TC. This important move satisfies both remaining requirements and effectively creates a distinction between the total formula's analytic and synthetic components. Specifically, for requirement 2: The conditional sentence does not make any information claim about the O-sentences in TC, it states only that "if" the variables in are satisfied by the relations, "then" the O-sentences will be true. This means that every O-sentence in TC that is logically implied by the sentence ^{R}TC → TC is L-true (every O-sentence in AT is true or not-true: for example, the metal expands or it does not; the chemical turns blue or it does not, etc.). Thus TC can be taken as the non-informative (meaning: non-factual) component of the statement, or A_{T}. Requirement 3 is satisfied by inference: given A_{T}, infer F_{T} → A_{T}. This makes A_{T} + F_{T} nothing more than a reformulation of the original theory, hence A_{T} Ù F_{T}ó TC.

Carnap took as a fundamental requirement a respect for the analytic–synthetic distinction. This is met by using two distinct processes in the formulation: drawing an empirical connection between the statement's factual content and the original theory (observational equivalence), and by requiring the analytic content to be observationally non-informative.

== Application ==
Carnap's reconstruction as it is given here is not intended to be a literal method for formulating scientific propositions. To capture what Pierre Duhem would call the entire "holistic" universe relating to any specified theory would require long and complicated renderings of ^{R}TC → TC. Instead, it is to be taken as demonstrating logically that there is a way that science could formulate empirical, observational explications of theoretical concepts – and in that context the Ramsey and Carnap construct can be said to provide a formal justificatory distinction between scientific observation and metaphysical inquiry.

== Criticism ==
Among critics of the Ramsey formalism are John Winnie – who extended the requirements to include an "observationally non-creative" restriction on Carnap's A_{T} – and W. V. O. Quine and Carl Hempel, who attacked Carnap's initial assumptions by emphasizing the ambiguity that persists between observable and non-observable terms.

== See also ==
- Ramsey-style epistemic structural realism
