= Bas van Fraassen =

American philosopher (born 1941)

- Born: 5 April 1941 (age 85); Goes, German-occupied Netherlands

Academic background
- Education: University of Alberta; University of Pittsburgh
- Thesis: Foundations of the Causal Theory of Time (1966)
- Doctoral advisor: Adolf Grünbaum
- Other advisor: Wilfrid Sellars

Academic work
- Era: Contemporary philosophy
- Region: Western philosophy
- School or tradition: Analytic philosophy Instrumentalism
- Doctoral students: Paul Thagard; Jenann Ismael; Ned Hall
- Main interests: Philosophy of science; Bayesian epistemology; Philosophical logic; Free logic
- Notable ideas: Constructive empiricism; Empiricist structuralism; Distinction between a theory's representing-as and representing-that; Supervaluationism; Epistemological voluntarism (reflection principle)

Bastiaan Cornelis "Bas" van Fraassen (/bɑːs vɑːn ˈfrɑːsən/; Dutch: [bɑs vɑn ˈfraːsə(n)]; born 5 April 1941) is a Dutch-American philosopher noted for his contributions to philosophy of science, epistemology and formal logic. He is a distinguished professor of philosophy at San Francisco State University and the McCosh Professor of Philosophy Emeritus at Princeton University.

== Biography and career ==
Van Fraassen was born in the German-occupied Netherlands on 5 April 1941. His father, a steam fitter, was forced by the Nazis to work in a factory in Hamburg. After the war, the family reunited and, in 1956, emigrated to Edmonton, in western Canada.

Van Fraassen earned his B.A. (1963) from the University of Alberta and his M.A. (1964) and Ph.D. (1966, under the direction of Adolf Grünbaum) from the University of Pittsburgh. He previously taught at Yale University, the University of Southern California, the University of Toronto and, from 1982 to 2008, at Princeton University, where he is now emeritus. Since 2008, Van Fraassen has taught at San Francisco State University, where he teaches courses in the philosophy of science, philosophical logic, and the role of modeling in scientific practice.

Van Fraassen is an adult convert to the Roman Catholic Church and is one of the founders of the Kira Institute. He is a fellow of the American Academy of Arts and Sciences; an overseas member of the Royal Netherlands Academy of Arts and Sciences since 1995; and a member of the International Academy of Philosophy of Science. In 1986, Van Fraassen received the Lakatos Award for his contributions to the philosophy of science and, in 2012, the Philosophy of Science Association's inaugural Hempel Award for lifetime achievement in philosophy of science. In 2026, he was awarded the Rolf Schock Prize in Logic and Philosophy.

Among his many students are the philosophers Elisabeth Lloyd at Indiana University, Anja Jauernig at New York University, Jenann Ismael at Johns Hopkins University, Ned Hall at Harvard University, Alan Hajek at the Australian National University and Professor of Mathematics Jukka Keranen at UCLA.

== Philosophical work ==
=== Philosophy of science ===
Van Fraassen coined the term "constructive empiricism" in his 1980 book The Scientific Image, in which he argued for agnosticism about the reality of unobservable entities. That book was "widely credited with rehabilitating scientific anti-realism." According to the Stanford Encyclopedia of Philosophy:

The constructive empiricist follows the logical positivists in rejecting metaphysical commitments in science, but parts with them regarding their endorsement of the verificationist criterion of meaning, as well as their endorsement of the suggestion that theory-laden discourse can and should be removed from science. Before van Fraassen's The Scientific Image, some philosophers had viewed scientific anti-realism as dead, because logical positivism was dead. Van Fraassen showed that there were other ways to be an empiricist with respect to science, without following in the footsteps of the logical positivists.

Paul M. Churchland, one of Van Fraassen's critics, contrasted Van Fraassen's idea of unobservable phenomena with the idea of merely unobserved phenomena.

In his 1989 book Laws and Symmetry, Van Fraassen attempted to lay the ground-work for explaining physical phenomena without assuming that such phenomena are caused by rules or laws which can be said to cause or govern their behavior. Focusing on the problem of underdetermination, he argued for the possibility that theories could have empirical equivalence but differ in their ontological commitments. He rejects the notion that the aim of science is to produce an account of the physical world that is literally true and instead maintains that its aim is to produce theories that are empirically adequate. Van Fraassen has also studied the philosophy of quantum mechanics, philosophical logic, and Bayesian epistemology.

=== Philosophical logic ===
Van Fraassen has been the editor of the Journal of Philosophical Logic and co-editor of the Journal of Symbolic Logic.

In logic, Van Frassen is best known for his work on free logic and his introduction of the supervaluation semantics. In his paper "Singular Terms, Truth-value Gaps, and Free Logic", Van Fraassen opens with a very brief introduction of the problem of non-referring names.

Instead of any unique formalization, though, he simply adjusts the axioms of a standard predicate logic such as that found in Willard Van Orman Quine's Methods of Logic. Instead of an axiom like $\forall x\,Px \Rightarrow \exists x\,Px$ he uses $( \forall x\,Px \land \exists x\,(x = a)) \Rightarrow \exists x\,Px$; this will naturally be true if the existential claim of the antecedent is false. If a name fails to refer, then the atomic sentence containing it can be assigned a truth value arbitrarily, provided that it is not an identity statement. Free logic is proved to be complete under this interpretation.

He indicates that, however, he sees no good reason to call statements which employ them either true or false. Some have attempted to solve this problem by means of many-valued logics; Van Fraassen offers in their stead the use of supervaluations. Questions of completeness change when supervaluations are admitted, since they allow for valid arguments that do not correspond to logically true conditionals.

His paper "Facts and tautological entailment" (J Phil 1969) is now regarded as the beginning of truth-maker semantics.

=== Bayesian epistemology ===
In "Belief and the Will", Van Fraassen proposed what is now known as Van Fraassen's reflection principle: "to satisfy the principle, the agent's present subjective probability for proposition A, on the supposition that his subjective probability for this proposition will equal r at some later time, must equal this same number r". Within Bayesian epistemology this principle is recognized as an important synchronic norm; Van Fraassen points out that a Dutch Book argument can be made in favor of the principle.

== Books ==
- Scientific Representation: Paradoxes of Perspective, OUP, 2008.
- The Empirical Stance, Yale University Press, 2002.
- Quantum Mechanics: An Empiricist View, Oxford University Press, 1991.
- Laws and Symmetry, Oxford University Press 1989.
- The Scientific Image, Oxford University Press 1980.
- Derivation and Counterexample: An Introduction to Philosophical Logic (with Karel Lambert), Dickenson Publishing Company, Inc. 1972.
- Formal Semantics and Logic, Macmillan, New York 1971.
- An Introduction to the Philosophy of Time and Space, Random House, New York 1970.

== See also ==
- American philosophy
- List of American philosophers
