= Constructive empiricism =

Form of empiricism in philosophy of science

In philosophy of science, constructive empiricism is a form of empiricism. While it is sometimes referred to as an empiricist form of structuralism, its main proponent, Bas van Fraassen, has consistently distinguished between the two views.

== Overview ==
Bas van Fraassen is nearly solely responsible for the initial development of constructive empiricism; its historically most important presentation appears in his The Scientific Image (1980). Constructive empiricism states that scientific theories are semantically literal, that they aim to be empirically adequate, and that their acceptance involves, as belief, only that they are empirically adequate. A theory is empirically adequate if and only if everything that it says about observable entities is true (regardless of what it says about unobservable entities). A theory is semantically literal if and only if the language of the theory is interpreted in such a way that the claims of the theory are either true or false (as opposed to an instrumentalist reading).

Constructive empiricism is thus a normative, semantic and epistemological thesis. That science aims to be empirically adequate expresses the normative component. That scientific theories are semantically literal expresses the semantic component. That acceptance involves, as belief, only that a theory is empirically adequate expresses the epistemological component.

Constructive empiricism opposes scientific realism, logical positivism (or logical empiricism) and instrumentalism. Constructive empiricism and scientific realism agree that theories are semantically literal, which logical positivism and instrumentalism deny. Constructive empiricism, logical positivism and instrumentalism agree that theories do not aim for truth about unobservables, which scientific realism denies.

Constructive empiricism has been used to analyze various scientific fields, from physics to psychology (especially computational psychology).

== See also ==
- Structuralism (philosophy of science), a related view
