= Ann-Sophie Barwich =

Cognitive scientist, philosopher, and historian of science

- Other name: Smellosopher
- Education: University of Exeter; Humboldt University of Berlin
- Known for: The philosophy of olfaction
- Scientific career
- Fields: Neurophilosophy; Cognitive neuroscience Neuroscience; Philosophy of Science; Olfaction
- Workplaces: Indiana University Bloomington; Konrad Lorenz Institute; Columbia University in the City of New York
- Thesis: Making Sense of Smell: Classifications and Model Thinking in Olfaction Theory (2013)
- Doctoral advisor: John Dupré; Michael Hauskeller
- Other academic advisors: Hasok Chang; Sabina Leonelli
- Website: www.smellosophy.com

Ann-Sophie Barwich is a cognitive scientist, an empirical philosopher, and a historian of science. She is an assistant professor with joint positions in the cognitive science program and the department of history and philosophy of science at Indiana University Bloomington. Barwich is best known for her interdisciplinary work on the history, philosophy, and neuroscience of olfaction. Her book, Smellosophy: What the Nose tells the Mind, highlights the importance of thinking about the sense of smell as a model for neuroscience and the senses. She is also noted for her analyses on methodological issues in molecular biology and neuroscience.

== Biography ==
Ann-Sophie Barwich, originally from Weimar, East Germany, received her Magister Artium (M.A.) in German Literature Studies and Philosophy in 2009 at the Humboldt University of Berlin with her thesis on causality in Leibniz and its relevance for theories of biological classification. She received her Ph.D. in philosophy in 2013 at the Centre for the Study of the Life Sciences at University of Exeter with advisors John Dupré and Michael Hauskeller, taking a philosophy of science approach to olfaction theory in her dissertation. Barwich held a postdoctoral fellowship at the Konrad Lorenz Institute for Evolution and Cognition Research before receiving the prestigious Presidential Scholar in Society and Neuroscience fellowship at the Center for Science and Society at Columbia University. At the center, she worked in the neuroscience lab of Stuart Firestein on the project “From the Air to the Brain: Laboratory Routines in Olfaction”.

== Research ==
Barwich's research focuses on the chemical senses, with olfaction as the main target of study. Her approach applies philosophical ideas to empirical research to inform theories and methods on how perception and cognition should be modeled in the brain. This combines historical and philosophical analyses with sociological, qualitative methods that include interviews with experts in neuroscience, psychology, chemistry, and the industry of perfumery. A prime example is the research that went into the book Smellosophy, in which she interviewed numerous neuroscientists such as Linda Buck, Stuart Firestein, philosophers including Barry C. Smith, winemaker Allison Tauziet, perfumers Harry Fremont and Christophe Laudamiel, sensory chemists such as Ann C. Noble, Avery Gilbert, as well as zoologists and biophysicists.

Her publications are clustered around two areas: (1) the perceptual and cultural dimensions of smell and its link to cognition, which brings theoretical analyses to the empirical exploration of three aspects of odor: its affective nature, its phenomenological structure, and its cross-modal influences with the other senses, and (2) the role of scientific expertise in laboratory-based neuroscience, focusing on how current advances in olfaction can contribute to the conceptual foundations of neuroscience. By tracking the emergence, success, and decline of standard laboratory routines, her research investigates the cognitive and behavioral patterns that influence scientific decision-making. Barwich is also notable in philosophy of neuroscience and philosophy of molecular biology for her work on the historical and philosophical study of G-protein coupled receptors (GPCRs).

== Awards ==
- Presidential Scholar in Society and Neuroscience fellowship at the Center for Science and Society, Columbia University

== Media appearances ==
Her work, especially her book, has been covered by Science and national outlets including The New York Times, The Wall Street Journal, Harpers, The Spectator, and The Times Literary Supplement. Smellosophy has also been selected by The Daily Telegraph as one of the "best wine books to buy for Christmas."

The parenting magazine Fatherly covered her work in articles on children's sense of smell, pre-teens' body odor, and debunking the myth that humans have a poor sense of smell. She has been interviewed by the Italian newspaper la Repubblica, Lynne Malcolm's All in the Mind program at ABC Radio National, and the Radio New Zealand Nine to Noon with Kathryn Ryan program. Barwich was also invited to appear on the game show Tell Me Something I Don't Know on Freakonomics Radio.

=== Podcasts ===
- The New Books Network
- The Super Awesome Science Show
- The SCI PHI Podcast
- Sean M. Carroll's Mindscape
- The Dissenter
- NOUS

== Public writings ==
Barwich is currently a writer for the column Molecules to Mind: The sense of smell as a window into mind and brain in Psychology Today. She has also written on smell training and wine tasting for the NEO.LIFE magazine, on the philosophy and science of olfaction for Aeon and Nautilus Quarterly, and the importance of olfaction for philosophy in The Philosophers' Magazine. During the COVID-19 pandemic, she wrote about COVID-19-related loss of smell and what it means for our understanding of the mind for StatNews. De Standaard picked up Barwich's work to address one of the core symptoms of COVID-19: the loss of smell and taste. Focusing on the case of Mary Hesse, she has also written for Aeon on the erasure of women philosophers from collective memory.

== Selected bibliography ==
- Barwich, Ann-Sophie (2020). Smellosophy: What the Nose tells the Mind. Harvard University Press. ISBN 9780674983694.
- Barwich, Ann-Sophie (2020). "What makes a discovery successful? The story of Linda Buck and the olfactory receptors" (PDF). Cell. 181 (4): 749–753. doi:10.1016/j.cell.2020.04.040. PMID 32413294. S2CID 218627484.
- Barwich, Ann-Sophie (2019). "The value of failure in science: The story of grandmother cells in neuroscience". Frontiers in Neuroscience. 13 (1121): 1121. doi:10.3389/fnins.2019.01121. PMC 6822296. PMID 31708726.
- Barwich, Ann-Sophie (2018). "Measuring the World: Olfaction as a Process Model of Perception". Everything flows: Towards a processual philosophy of biology. Oxford University Press. ISBN 9780198779636.
- Barwich, Ann-Sophie; Karim, Baschir (2017). "The Manipulability of What? The History of G–Protein Coupled Receptors". Biology and Philosophy. 32 (6): 1317–1339. doi:10.1007/s10539-017-9608-9. hdl:2022/26207. S2CID 148645746.
- Barwich, Ann-Sophie (2016). "What is so special about smell? Olfaction as a model system in neurobiology". Postgraduate Medical Journal. 92 (1083): 27–33. doi:10.1136/postgradmedj-2015-133249. PMID 26534994. S2CID 31525667.
- Barwich, Ann-Sophie; Chang, Hasok (2015). "Sensory measurements: coordination and standardization". Biological Theory. 10 (3): 200–211. doi:10.1007/s13752-015-0222-2. S2CID 82111463.
- Barwich, Ann-Sophie (2014). "A sense so rare: Measuring olfactory experiences and making a case for a process perspective on sensory perception". Biological Theory. 9 (3): 258–268. doi:10.1007/s13752-014-0165-z. S2CID 84039814.
