= Unit of selection =

Biological entity within the hierarchy of biological organization

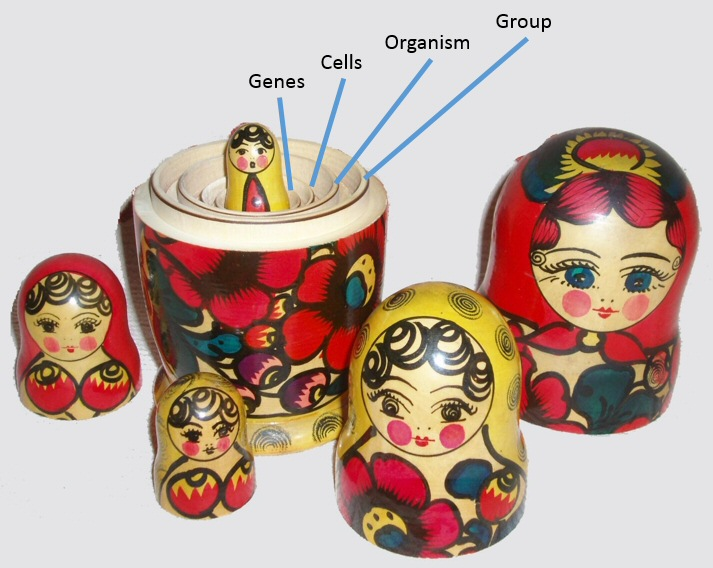
David Sloan Wilson and Elliott Sober's 1994 Multilevel Selection Model, illustrated by a nested set of Russian matryoshka dolls. Wilson himself compared his model to such a set.

A unit of selection is a biological entity within the hierarchy of biological organization (for example, an entity such as: a self-replicating molecule, a gene, a cell, an organism, a group, or a species) that is subject to natural selection. There is debate among evolutionary biologists about the extent to which evolution has been shaped by selective pressures acting at these different levels.

There is debate over the relative importance of the units themselves. For instance, is it group or individual selection that has driven the evolution of altruism? Where altruism reduces the fitness of individuals, individual-centered explanations for the evolution of altruism become complex and rely on the use of game theory, for instance; see kin selection and group selection. There also is debate over the definition of the units themselves, and the roles for selection and replication, and whether these roles may change in the course of evolution.

== Fundamental theory ==
Two useful introductions to the fundamental theory underlying the unit of selection issue and debate, which also present examples of multi-level selection from the entire range of the biological hierarchy (typically with entities at level N-1 competing for increased representation, i.e., higher frequency, at the immediately higher level N, e.g., organisms in populations or cell lineages in organisms), are Richard Lewontin's classic piece The Units of Selection and John Maynard-Smith and Eörs Szathmáry's co-authored book, The Major Transitions in Evolution. As a theoretical introduction to units of selection, Lewontin writes:

The generality of the principles of natural selection means that any entities in nature that have variation, reproduction, and heritability may evolve. ...the principles can be applied equally to genes, organisms, populations, species, and at opposite ends of the scale, prebiotic molecules and ecosystems." (1970, pp. 1-2)

Elisabeth Lloyd's book The Structure and Confirmation of Evolutionary Theory provides a basic philosophical introduction to the debate. Three more recent introductions include Samir Okasha's book Evolution and the Levels of Selection, Pierrick Bourrat's book Facts, Conventions, and the Levels of Selection, and Elisabeth Lloyd and Javier Suárez book Units of Selection.

== Selection at each level ==
Below, cases of selection at the genic, cellular, individual and group level from within the multi-level selection perspective are presented and discussed.

=== Nucleic acid ===
George C. Williams in his influential book Adaptation and Natural Selection was one of the first to present a gene-centered view of evolution with the gene as the unit of selection, arguing that a unit of selection should exhibit a high degree of permanence.

Richard Dawkins has written several books popularizing and expanding the idea. According to Dawkins, genes cause phenotypes and a gene is 'judged' by its phenotypic effects. Dawkins distinguishes entities which survive or fail to survive ("replicators") from entities with temporary existence that interact directly with the environment ("vehicles"). Genes are "replicators" whereas individuals and groups of individuals are "vehicles". Dawkins argues that, although they are both aspects of the same process, "replicators" rather than "vehicles" should be preferred as units of selection. This is because replicators, owing to their permanence, should be regarded as the ultimate beneficiaries of adaptations. Genes are replicators and therefore the gene is the unit of selection. Dawkins further expounded this view in an entire chapter called 'God's utility function' in the book River Out of Eden where he explained that genes alone have utility functions.

Some clear-cut examples of selection at the level of the gene include meiotic drive and retrotransposons. In both of these cases, gene sequences increase their relative frequency in a population without necessarily providing benefits at other levels of organization. Meiotic-drive mutations (see segregation distortion) manipulate the machinery of chromosomal segregation so that chromosomes carrying the mutation are later found in more than half of the gametes produced by individuals heterozygous for the mutation, and for this reason the frequency of the mutation increases in the population.

Retrotransposons are DNA sequences that, once replicated by the cellular machinery, insert themselves in the genome more or less randomly. Such insertions can be very mutagenic and thus reduce drastically individual fitness, so that there is strong selection against elements that are very active. Meiotic-drive alleles have also been shown strongly to reduce individual fitness, clearly exemplifying the potential conflict between selection at different levels.

According to the RNA world hypothesis, RNA sequences performing both enzymatic and information storage roles in autocatalytic sets were an early unit of selection and evolution that would later transition into living cells. It is possible that RNA-based evolution is still taking place today. Other subcellular entities such as viruses, both DNA-based and RNA-based, do evolve.

The gene-centered view of evolution normally refers to selection among different alleles of the same gene. However, gene families also differ in their tendency to diversify and avoid loss during evolution. This latter form of selection more closely resembles clade selection of groups of species.

=== Epigene ===
There is also view that evolution is acting on epigenes.

=== Cell ===
Leo Buss in his book The Evolution of Individuality proposes that much of the evolution of development in animals reflects the conflict between selective pressures acting at the level of the cell and those acting at the level of the multicellular individual. This perspective can shed new light on phenomena as diverse as gastrulation and germ line sequestration.

This selection for unconstrained proliferation is in conflict with the fitness interests of the individual, and thus there is tension between selection at the level of the cell and selection at the level of the individual. Since the proliferation of specific cells of the vertebrate immune system to fight off infecting pathogens is a case of programmed and exquisitely contained cellular proliferation, it represents a case of the individual manipulating selection at the level of the cell to enhance its own fitness. In the case of the vertebrate immune system, selection at the level of the cell and individual are not in conflict.

Some view cancer stem cells as units of selection.

=== Behavioural ===
Gene–culture coevolution was developed to explain how human behavior is a product of two different and interacting evolutionary processes: genetic evolution and cultural evolution.

=== Organism ===
Selection at the level of the organism can be described as Darwinism, and is well understood and considered common. If a relatively faster gazelle manages to survive and reproduce more, the causation of the higher fitness of this gazelle can be fully accounted for if one looks at how individual gazelles fare under predation.

The speed of the faster gazelle could be caused by a single gene, be polygenic, or be fully environmentally determined, but the unit of selection in this case is the individual since speed is a property of each individual gazelle.

When speaking about individual organism evolution an extended phenotype and superorganism must be also mentioned.

=== Group ===
If a group of organisms, owing to their interactions or division of labor, provides superior fitness compared to other groups, where the fitness of the group is higher or lower than the mean fitness of the constituent individuals, group selection can be declared to occur.

Specific syndromes of selective factors can create situations in which groups are selected because they display group properties which are selected-for. Many common examples of group traits are reducible to individual traits, however. Selection of these traits is thus more simply explained as selection of individual traits.

Some mosquito-transmitted rabbit viruses are only transmitted to uninfected rabbits from infected rabbits which are still alive. This creates a selective pressure on every group of viruses already infecting a rabbit not to become too virulent and kill their host rabbit before enough mosquitoes have bitten it, since otherwise all the viruses inside the dead rabbit would rot with it. And indeed in natural systems such viruses display much lower virulence levels than do mutants of the same viruses that in laboratory culture readily outcompete non-virulent variants (or than do tick-transmitted viruses since ticks do bite dead rabbits).

In the previous passage, the group is assumed to have "lower virulence", i.e., "virulence" is presented as a group trait. One could argue then that the selection is in fact against individual viruses that are too virulent. In this case, however, the fitness of all viruses within a rabbit is affected by what the group does to the rabbit. Indeed, the proper, directly selected group property is that of "not killing the rabbit too early" rather than individual virulence. In situations such as these, we would expect there to be selection for cooperation amongst the viruses in a group in such a way that the group will not "kill the rabbit too early". It is of course true that any group behavior is the result of individual traits, such as individual viruses suppressing the virulence of their neighbours, but the causes of phenotypes are rarely the causes of fitness differences.

=== Species and higher levels ===
It remains controversial among biologists whether selection can operate at and above the level of species. Proponents of species selection include R. A. Fisher (1929); Sewall Wright (1956); Richard Lewontin (1970); Niles Eldredge & Stephen Jay Gould (1972); Steven M. Stanley (1975). Gould proposed that there exist macroevolutionary processes which shape evolution, not driven by the microevolutionary mechanisms of the Modern Synthesis. If one views species as entities that replicate (speciate) and die (go extinct) within a clade, then species could be subject to selection and thus could change their occurrence over geological time, much as heritable selected-for traits change theirs over generations. For evolution to be driven by species selection, differential success must be the result of selection upon species-intrinsic properties, rather than for properties of genes, cells, individuals, or populations within species. Such properties include, for example, population structure, their propensity to speciate, extinction rates, and geological persistence. While the fossil record shows differential persistence of species, examples of species-intrinsic properties subject to natural selection have been much harder to document.

One issue with selection among clades is that they are not independent, i.e. all species are descended from the same last universal common ancestor and are thus part of the same clade. This criticism does not apply to selection among different gene families that are not evolutionarily related, and which are duplicated and lost at different rates rather than speciating and going extinct at different rates.

In the microbial realm, it has been interpreted that the unit of selection is a blend of ecological and functional behaviors, or guilds, beyond the species-level.

== Sources ==
- Brandon, Robert; Burian, Richard M. eds., (1984) Genes, Organisms, Population: Controversies Over the Units of Selection. Cambridge MA: MIT Press. (ISBN 978-0-262-02205-7)
- Buss, Leo W. (1988) The Evolution of Individuality. (ISBN 0-691-08468-8)
- Williams, G. C. (1966) Adaptation and Natural Selection. Princeton University Press, Princeton. (ISBN 0-691-02615-7)
- Dawkins, Richard (1976; 1989; 2006) The Selfish Gene. Oxford University Press, Oxford. (ISBN 0-19-286092-5)
- Gould, Stephen Jay (2002) The Structure of Evolutionary Theory. Harvard University Press.
- Lloyd, Elisabeth (1988) The Structure and Confirmation of Evolutionary Theory, Greenwood Press (Reprinted Princeton University Press, 1994 ISBN 0-691-00046-8).
- Sober, Elliott (1984; 1993) The Nature of Selection: Evolutionary Theory in Philosophical Focus. The University of Chicago Press.
- Maynard Smith, J. Evolutionary Genetics. Oxford University Press, 1998.
- Okasha, S. (2006) Evolution and the levels of Selection. Oxford University Press.
- Bourrat, P. (2021) Facts, Conventions and the Levels of Selection. Cambridge University Press.
