= Rachel Ankeny =

Philosopher and historian of science

Rachel A. Ankeny FAHA FASSA

Education
- Education: St. John's College, Santa Fe; University of Pittsburgh; University of Adelaide
- Doctoral advisor: James G. Lennox

Philosophical work
- Region: The Netherlands
- School: Philosophy of science in practice
- Institutions: Wageningen University; University of Adelaide
- Main interests: Philosophy of Biological & Biomedical Sciences; Philosophy of Science; Philosophy of Medicine; Bioethics; Food & Agricultural Ethics

Rachel Ankeny FAHA FASSA was appointed as Chair and Professor of philosophy at Wageningen University in 2024. She was previously Professor of history and philosophy at the University of Adelaide, where she worked from 2006 to 2024 and served as Deputy Dean Research (Faculty of Arts) from 2011 to 2022. She remains affiliated as an honorary professor at Adelaide.

In 2020, she was elected as a fellow of the American Association for the Advancement of Science (AAAS) "for her contributions to our understanding of the foundational roles that organisms play in biological research and her leadership in history and philosophy of science." She is currently the past president of the International Society for the History, Philosophy, and Social Studies of Biology (ISHPSSB) and Editor-in-Chief of Studies in History and Philosophy of Science.

== Biography ==
After finishing her B.A. at St. John's College (Santa Fe), studying the Great Books curriculum, Ankeny held an independent Thomas J. Watson Fellowship to explore families' understandings of and responses to Huntington disease risk in England, Scotland, Wales, and Denmark. She then worked for the Great Books of the Western World series at Encyclopædia Britannica and the Paideia Program in Chicago for 3 years. Ankeny received M.A.s in bioethics and in philosophy from the University of Pittsburgh, and her Ph.D. in the History and Philosophy of Science from the University of Pittsburgh. She also holds a M.A. degree in gastronomy from the University of Adelaide, where she wrote a thesis on celebratory food habits among immigrants of Italo-Australian and Italian-American origin. Prior to joining the faculty of the University of Adelaide, she was director of the Unit for History and Philosophy of Science at the University of Sydney (2000–2006).

== Research ==
Ankeny is known for her work on philosophy of science in practice, an emerging field that combines empirical approaches to the study of scientific practice with philosophical analyses. She was co-founder of the international organization Society for Philosophy of Science in Practice in 2005, together with Mieke Boon, Marcel Boumans, Hasok Chang, and Henk W. de Regt. Ankeny's work in the history and philosophy of science concerns the use of scientific models, case-based reasoning, model organisms, and the nature of scientific change. She led the project Organisms and Us: How living things help us to understand our world which explored the roles of non-human organisms in biological research and how researchers use organisms in 20th and early 21st-century science together with Sabina Leonelli and Michael Dietrich. She also is known for her co-authored work on repertoires in scientific practice with Leonelli, which provides an analytical framework for understanding how scientific communities and research groups function, focusing on the diverse conditions that enable scientific practices and knowledge production.

Ankeny's expertise also includes philosophy of medicine, bioethics, science policy, and food and agricultural studies. She founded the Food Values Research Group at University of Adelaide which seeks to understand the decision-making processes behind everyday food choices and how they are shaped by social, cultural and historical influences and individual and community values. She leads the Australian National Health and Medical Research Council (NHMRC) Medical Research Future Fund MRFF project, Enabling Openness in Australian Stem Cell Research (EOAR) an interdisciplinary research cluster explores building trust in stem cell-based research and therapies. She is an associated researcher and PhD supervisor on the Australian Research Council Training Centre for Future Crops Development in the program associated with ethical, legal, and social research on opportunities for innovation in alignment with community needs.

== Recognition ==
In 2020, Ankeny was elected as a History and Philosophy of Science Fellow of the American Association for the Advancement of Science. She was elected president of ISHPSSB in 2019. Ankeny was elected a Fellow of the Academy of the Social Sciences in Australia in 2022 and of the Australian Academy of the Humanities in 2024.

== Media and public engagement ==
Ankeny has been frequently interviewed by Australian national and international networks and programs on issues including genetic editing and GMO labeling, the quality and value of foods, updates to the Food Standards Australia New Zealand, and eating habits. She has been invited as a guest on multiple programs at ABC Radio National, including Robyn Williams's Ockham's Razor, Jonathan Green's Blueprint, the Health Report, Linda Mottram's PM, and the Catalyst. Her bylines include The Conversation, Online Opinion, The ABC's Religion and Ethics portal, and the Griffith Review. She also has been a featured speaker at science-related public events including at Adelaide Writers' Week, the Adelaide Festival of Ideas, and the World Science Festival Brisbane.

== Selected publications ==
- Model Organisms (2020) with Sabina Leonelli. (ISBN 9781108593014) Available open access at https://www.cambridge.org/core/books/model-organisms/F895B26EAC0373BCA5A138835AC73AEA.
