= Barry Stroud =

Canadian philosopher (1935–2019)

- Barry Stroud in 2009
- Born: May 18, 1935; Toronto, Ontario, Canada
- Died: August 9, 2019 (aged 84); Berkeley, California, U.S.

Education
- Education: East York Collegiate; University of Toronto; Harvard University (PhD)
- Thesis: Two Conventionalist Theories of Logical Truth (1962)
- Doctoral advisor: Morton White

Philosophical work
- Era: Contemporary philosophy
- Region: Western philosophy
- School: Analytic philosophy
- Institutions: University of California, Berkeley
- Doctoral students: Graciela De Pierris
- Main interests: Metaphysics, epistemology, philosophical skepticism, David Hume, Ludwig Wittgenstein
- Notable ideas: Transcendental approach to dealing with philosophical skepticism

Barry Stroud (/straʊd/; 18 May 1935 – 9 August 2019) was a Canadian philosopher and professor at the University of California, Berkeley. Known especially for his work on philosophical skepticism, he wrote about David Hume, Ludwig Wittgenstein, the metaphysics of color, and many other topics.

== Biography ==
Barry Greenwood Stroud was born on 18 May 1935 in Toronto, Ontario, Canada. He was the second of two sons to William and Florence Stroud (who were both born in the U.K. but emigrated to Canada as children). He attended high school at the East York Collegiate.

=== Academic career ===
Stroud received a B.A. in philosophy from the University of Toronto in 1958. At Harvard University he received an A.M. in 1960. With a thesis titled Two Conventionalistic Theories of Logical Truth, written under the direction of Morton White, he received his Ph.D. there in 1962.

From 1961, until his retirement, Stroud worked at the University of California, Berkeley. He was made a full professor there in 1974 and, from 1994, served as the Mills Professor of Metaphysics and Epistemology. In 2007 he was named Willis S. and Marion Slusser Professor of Philosophy in the Berkeley Philosophy Department, a position he held until he retired as professor emeritus. Though officially retiring at the end of the 2015-2016 academic year, he continued his research, teaching and advising as a professor of the Graduate School. During his tenure he had served as departmental chair from 1978 to 1981, 1984 to 1985, and in 1998.

Stroud was a visiting professor of philosophy at the University of Oslo (1974), at the National Autonomous University of Mexico (1979), and at the University of California, Los Angeles (1983-1984, and 1997). In 1981 Stroud was awarded a Guggenheim Fellowship. and spent a sabbatical year in Venice. He was elected a Fellow of the American Academy of Arts & Sciences in 1987, and a corresponding fellow of the British Academy in 1993.

Over 1986–1987, as a visiting fellow of New College and All Souls College, Stroud gave the John Locke Lectures at Oxford University under the title 'The Quest for Reality.' He also delivered the Gareth Evans Memorial Lecture at Oxford and Whitehead Lectures at Harvard. To the American Philosophical Association, which he served as Pacific Division president in 1995–1996, he gave the Dewey Lecture in 2008 and the Patrick Romanell Lecture in 2009. Stroud also delivered the Tanner Lectures on Human Values at the University of Buenos Aires in 1988. He returned to Brazil, where several of his works have been translated into Portuguese and discussed in print, in 2014 to participate in the 16th ANPOF conference in Campos do Jordão,

=== Philosophical work ===
Stroud's first book Hume (1977), which received positive reviews from R. F. Atkinson in Hume Studies and Donald W. Livingston amongst others, won the Matchette Prize in 1979. It would be followed, in 1984, by The Significance of Philosophical Scepticism and, in 1999, by The Quest for Reality: Subjectivism and the Metaphysics of Colour. Stroud's Engagement and Metaphysical Dissatisfaction: Modality and Value was published in 2011.

2011 would also see the publication of the first book-length critical treatment of Stroud's thought, The Possibility of Philosophical Understanding: Reflections on the Thought of Barry Stroud. It included essay contributions from Robert Fogelin, Ernest Sosa, John McDowell, Sarah Stroud and UC Berkeley colleague Hannah Ginsborg amongst others. Some of the central themes of his philosophical work are interpreted and elaborated upon in the volume editors' introduction to that work.

Several collections of Stroud's essays would also be published in his lifetime, the last of these appearing in 2018.

=== Death ===
Having been diagnosed with advanced stage brain cancer just two months prior, Barry Stroud died on 9 August 2019.

Announcing his death, Berkeley Philosophy Department recorded that:

His body of work, his influence on generations of students, his imprint on the character of our department, the example that he set of the purest philosophical inquiry — all of it is beyond reckoning. As hard as it is to imagine what philosophy at Berkeley will be like without him, it is even harder to imagine what it would have been.

A memorial by former student, and fellow philosopher, John Schwenkler was published by 3 Quarks Daily on 19 August 2019.

Obituaries in the UC Berkeley News and The Daily Californian followed shortly after.

== Works ==
=== Books ===
- (1977) Hume (Arguments of the Philosophers) Routledge. ISBN 0415203635, 9780415203630.
- (1984) The Significance of Philosophical Scepticism. Oxford University Press. ISBN 978-0-19-824761-6, doi:10.1093/0198247613.001.0001.
- (1999) The Quest for Reality: Subjectivism and the Metaphysics of Colour. Oxford University Press. ISBN 978-0-19-513388-2, doi:10.1093/0195151887.001.0001.
- (2000) Understanding Human Knowledge: Philosophical Essays. Oxford University Press. ISBN 978-0-19-825033-3.
- (2000) Meaning, Understanding, and Practice: Philosophical Essays. Oxford University Press. ISBN 978-0-19-825034-0.
- (2011) Engagement and Metaphysical Dissatisfaction: Modality and Value. Oxford University Press. ISBN 978-0-19-976496-9.
- (2011) Philosophers Past and Present: Selected Essays. Oxford University Press. ISBN 978-0-19-960859-1, doi:10.1093/acprof:oso/9780199608591.001.0001
- (2018) Seeing, Knowing, Understanding: Philosophical Essays. Oxford University Press. ISBN 978-0-19-880975-3, doi:10.1093/oso/9780198809753.001.0001

=== Select articles/chapters ===
- (1965) Wittgenstein and Logical Necessity (1965). Reprinted in: A Priori Knowledge, 1987
- (1968) Transcendental Arguments The Journal of Philosophy, Vol. 65, No. 9 (May 2, 1968), pp. 241–256
- (1980) Berkeley v. Locke on Primary Qualities Philosophy, Vol. 55, No. 212 (Apr., 1980), pp. 149–166
- (1984) The Problem of the External World Chapter I of The Significance of Philosophical Skepticism (1984)
- (1984) The Disappearing ‘We’, Jonathan Lear, Barry Stroud, Aristotelian Society Supplementary Volume, Volume 58, Issue 1, 1 July 1984, pp. 219–258,
- (1984) G. E. Moore and Scepticism: ‘Internal’ and ‘External, Chapter III of The Significance of Philosophical Scepticism
- (1985) An End to Anxiety: Review of four books on Wittgenstein, The London Review of Books 18 July 1985
- (1987) XV—The Physical World, Proceedings of the Aristotelian Society, Volume 87, Issue 1, 1 June 1987, pp. 263–277
- (1988) The Study of Human Nature and the Subjectivity of Value, The Tanner Lectures on Human Values.
- (1994) Philosophical Scepticism, Ernest Sosa, Barry Stroud Proceedings of the Aristotelian Society, Supplementary Volumes, Vol. 68 (1994), pp. 263–307
- (1996) The Charm of Naturalism, Proceedings and Addresses of the American Philosophical Association 70 (2):43 - 55 (1996)
- (2008) Modes of philosophizing: A round table debate with Jonathan Barnes, Myles Burnyeat and Raymond Geuss, Eurozine, May 2008
- (2011) Feelings and the Ascription of Feelings, Teorema, January 2011 pp. 25–33
- (2016) Responses to Sceptical Essays Sképsis, ISSN 1981-4194, ANO VII, Nº 14, 2016, p. 218-233.

Full publications list: at UC Berkeley homepage.

== See also ==
- Canadian philosophy
- List of Canadian philosophers
