= Nominal fallacy =

Logical fallacy equating naming something with explaining it

The nominal fallacy, also known as the naming-explaining fallacy, is a logical fallacy in which it is incorrectly assumed that giving something a name is tantamount to explaining it. Stuart Firestein has described the fallacy as "...the error of believing that the label carries explanatory information." One example of the nominal fallacy is the use of the word "instinct" to explain a given behavior. An assertion, statement or assumption that an entity X exhibits a certain property due to its name would exemplify the nominal fallacy.
