= Richard Healey =

Richard Healey may refer to:

- Richard Healey (luger)
- Richard Healey (philosopher), American philosopher
- Rich Healey, Canadian ice hockey
- Dick Healey, New South Wales politician
- Dick Healey (footballer)
