= Artificial chemistry =

Simulated system used to study chemical processes

An artificial chemistry is a chemical-like system that usually consists of objects, called molecules, that interact according to rules resembling chemical reaction rules. Artificial chemistries are created and studied in order to understand fundamental properties of chemical systems, including prebiotic evolution, as well as for developing chemical computing systems. Artificial chemistry is a field within computer science wherein chemical reactions—often biochemical ones—are computer-simulated, yielding insights on evolution, self-assembly, and other biochemical phenomena. The field does not use actual chemicals, and should not be confused with either synthetic chemistry or computational chemistry. Rather, bits of information are used to represent the starting molecules, and the end products are examined along with the processes that led to them. The field originated in artificial life but has shown to be a versatile method with applications in many fields such as chemistry, economics, sociology and linguistics.

== Formal definition ==
An artificial chemistry is defined in general as a triple (S, R, A). In some cases it is sufficient to define it as a tuple (S, I).

- S is the set of possible molecules S = {s_{1}, …, s_{n}}, where n is the number of elements in the set, possibly infinite.
- R is a set of n-ary operations on the molecules in S, the reaction rules R = {r_{1}, …, r_{n}}. Each rule r_{i} is written like a chemical reaction, e.g. a + b + c → a* + b* + c*. Note here that r_{i} are operators, as opposed to +.
- A is an algorithm describing how to apply the rules R to a subset P ⊂ S.
- I are the interaction rules of the molecules in S.

== Types of artificial chemistries ==
- depending on the space of possible molecules
  - finite
  - infinite
- depending on the type of reactions
  - catalytic systems
  - reactive systems
  - inhibitive systems
- depending on the space topology
  - well stirred reactor
  - topologically arranged (1-, 2-, and 3-dimensional)

== Important concepts ==
- The field is heavily reliant on mathematics, to include mathematical modeling. It in fact relies more on a mathematics background than a chemistry background.
- Organizations: An organization is a set of molecules that is closed and self-maintaining. As such, it is a set that does not create anything outside itself, and such that any molecule inside the set can be generated within the set.
- Closed sets
- Self-maintaining sets
- Hasse diagram of organizations

== History of artificial chemistries ==
Artificial chemistries emerged as a sub-field of artificial life, in particular from strong artificial life. The idea behind this field was that if one wanted to build something alive, it had to be done by a combination of non-living entities. For instance, a cell is itself alive, and yet is a combination of non-living molecules. Artificial chemistry enlists, among others, researchers that believe in an extreme bottom-up approach to artificial life. In artificial life, bits of information were used to represent bacteria or members of a species, each of which moved, multiplied, or died in computer simulations. In artificial chemistry bits of information are used to represent starting molecules capable of reacting with one another. The field has pertained to artificial intelligence by virtue of the fact that, over billions of years, non-living matter evolved into primordial life forms which in turn evolved into intelligent life forms.

== Important contributors ==
The first reference about Artificial Chemistries come from a Technical paper written by John McCaskill . Walter Fontana working with Leo Buss then took up the work developing the AlChemy model . The model was presented at the second International Conference of Artificial Life. In his first papers he presented the concept of organization, as a set of molecules that is algebraically closed and self-maintaining. This concept was further developed by Dittrich and Speroni di Fenizio into a theory of chemical organizations .

Two main schools of artificial chemistries have been in Japan and Germany. In Japan the main researchers have been Takashi Ikegami , Hideaki Suzuki and Yasuhiro Suzuki . In Germany, it was Wolfgang Banzhaf, who, together with his students Peter Dittrich and Jens Ziegler, developed various artificial chemistry models. Their 2001 paper 'Artificial Chemistries - A Review' became a standard in the field. Jens Ziegler, as part of his PhD thesis, proved that an artificial chemistry could be used to control a small Khepera robot . Among other models, Peter Dittrich developed the Seceder model which is able to explain group formation in society through some simple rules. Since then he became a professor in Jena where he investigates artificial chemistries as a way to define a general theory of constructive dynamical systems.

== Applications of artificial chemistries ==
Artificial Chemistries are often used in the study of protobiology, in trying to bridge the gap between chemistry and biology. A further motivation to study artificial chemistries is the interest in constructive dynamical systems. Yasuhiro Suzuki has modeled various systems such as membrane systems, signaling pathways (P53), ecosystems, and enzyme systems by using his method, abstract rewriting system on multisets (ARMS).

== Artificial chemistry in popular culture ==
In the 1994 science-fiction novel Permutation City by Greg Egan, brain-scanned emulated humans known as Copies inhabit a simulated world which includes the Autoverse, an artificial life simulator based on a cellular automaton complex enough to represent the substratum of an artificial chemistry. Tiny environments are simulated in the Autoverse and filled with populations of a simple, designed lifeform, Autobacterium lamberti. The purpose of the Autoverse is to allow Copies to explore the life that had evolved there after it had been run on a significantly large segment of the simulated universe (referred to as "Planet Lambert").

== See also ==
- Avida Digital Evolution
- Cellular automata
- Computational chemistry - the use of simplified models to simulate chemical interactions
