= Lakatos Award =

English philosophy award

- Awarded for: an outstanding contribution to the philosophy of science.
- Sponsored by: Latsis Foundation
- Reward: £10,000
- Website: www.lse.ac.uk/philosophy/lakatos-award/

The Lakatos Award is given annually for an outstanding contribution to the philosophy of science, widely interpreted. The contribution must be in the form of a monograph, co-authored or single-authored, and published in English during the previous six years. The award is in memory of the influential Hungarian philosopher of science and mathematics Imre Lakatos, whose tenure as Professor of Logic at the London School of Economics and Political Science (LSE) was cut short by his early and unexpected death. While administered by an international management committee organised from the LSE, it is independent of the LSE Department of Philosophy, Logic, and Scientific Method, with many of the committee's members being academics from other institutions. The value of the award, which has been endowed by the Latsis Foundation, is £10,000, and to take it up a successful candidate must visit the LSE and deliver a public lecture.

== Selection ==
The award is administered by the following committee:

- Professor Roman Frigg (Convenor, LSE)
- Professor Richard Bradley (LSE)
- Professor Hasok Chang (University of Cambridge)
- Professor Nancy Cartwright (University of Durham)
- Professor Kostas Gavroglu (University of Athens)
- Professor Helen Longino (Stanford University)
- Professor Samir Okasha (University of Bristol)
- Professor Sabina Leonelli (University of Exeter)

The Committee makes the Award on the advice of an independent and anonymous panel of selectors.

== Winners ==
The Award has so far been won by:

1986 – Bas Van Fraassen for The Scientific Image (1980) and Hartry Field for Science Without Numbers (1980)
1987 – Michael Friedman for Foundations of Space-Time Theories and Philip Kitcher for Vaulting Ambition: Sociobiology and the Quest for Human Nature
1988 – Michael Redhead for Incompleteness, Nonlocality and Realism
1989 – John Earman for A Primer on Determinism
1991 – Elliott Sober for Reconstructing the Past: Parsimony, Evolution, and Interference (1988)
1993 – Peter Achinstein for Particles and Waves: Historical Essays in the Philosophy of Science (1991) and Alexander Rosenberg for Economics—Mathematical Politics or Science of Diminishing Returns? (1992)
1994 – Michael Dummett for Frege: Philosophy of Mathematics (1991)
1995 – Lawrence Sklar for Physics and Chance: Philosophical Issues in the Foundations of Statistical Mechanics (1993)
1996 – Abner Shimony for The Search for a Naturalistic World View (1993)
1998 – Jeffrey Bub for Interpreting the Quantum World and Deborah Mayo for Error and the Growth of Experimental Knowledge
1999 – Brian Skyrms for Evolution of the Social Contract (1996) on modelling 'fair', non self-interested human actions using (cultural) evolutionary dynamics
2001 – Judea Pearl for Causality: Models, Reasoning and Inference (2000) on causal models and causal reasoning
2002 – Penelope Maddy for Naturalism in Mathematics (1997) on the issue of how the axioms of set theory are justified
2003 – Patrick Suppes for Representation and Invariance of Scientific Structures (2002) on axiomatising a wide range of scientific theories in terms of set theory
2004 – Kim Sterelny for Thought in a Hostile World: The Evolution of Human Cognition (2003) ISBN 978-0-631-18886-5 on the idea that thought is a response to threat
2005 – James Woodward for Making Things Happen (2003) on causality and explanation
2006 – Harvey Brown for Physical Relativity: Space-time Structure from a Dynamical Perspective (2005) and Hasok Chang for Inventing Temperature: Measurement and Scientific Progress (2004)
2008 – Richard Healey for Gauging What’s Real: the conceptual foundations of contemporary gauge theories (2007)
2009 – Samir Okasha for Evolution and the Levels of Selection (2006).
2010 – Peter Godfrey-Smith for Darwinian Populations and Natural Selection
2012 – Wolfgang Spohn for The Laws of Belief: Ranking Theory and its Philosophical Implications (2012)
2013 – Laura Ruetsche for Interpreting Quantum Theories (2011) and David Wallace for The Emergent Multiverse: Quantum Theory According to the Everett Interpretation (2012)
2014 – Gordon Belot for Geometric Possibility (2011) and David Malament for Topics in the Foundations of General Relativity and Newtonian Gravitation Theory (2012)
2015 – Thomas Pradeu for The Limits of the Self: Immunology and Biological Identity (2012) ISBN 978-0-19-977528-6
2016 – Brian Epstein for The Ant Trap: Rebuilding the Foundations of the Social Sciences (2015) ISBN 978-0-19-938110-4
2017 – Craig Callender for What Makes Time Special? ISBN 978-0-19-879730-2
2018 – Sabina Leonelli for Data-Centric Biology: A Philosophical Study (2016) ISBN 978-0-226-41647-2
2019 – Henk W. de Regt for Understanding Scientific Understanding (2017) ISBN 978-0-19-065291-3
2020 – Nicholas Shea for Representation in Cognitive Science (2018) ISBN 978-0-19-881288-3
2021 – Anya Plutynski for Explaining Cancer: Finding Order in Disorder (2018) ISBN 978-0-19-996745-2
2022 – Catarina Dutilh Novaes for The Dialogical Roots of Deduction: Historical, Cognitive, and Philosophical Perspectives on Reasoning (2020) ISBN 978-1-10-880079-2
2023 – Michela Massimi for Perspectival Realism (2022).
2024 – Carl Hoefer for Chance in the World: A Humean Guide to Objective Chance (2019).
2025 – Mazviita Chirimuuta for The Brain Abstracted: Simplification in the History and Philosophy of Neuroscience (2024)
2026 – John D. Norton for The Material Theory of Induction (2021) and The Large Scale Structure of Inductive Inference (2024)
