= Janiak =

Janiak is a surname. Notable people with the surname include:

- Andrew Janiak, American philosopher
- Claude Janiak (born 1948), Swiss politician and lawyer
- Edward Janiak (1952–2021), Polish bishop and theologian
- Jeff Janiak (born 1976), American/British punk rock singer and songwriter, Discharge
- Leigh Janiak (born 1980), American film director and screenwriter
