= Graciela De Pierris =

Argentine-American philosopher (1950–2024)

- Born: January 1, 1950; Argentina
- Died: August 20, 2024 (aged 74); Stanford, California, U.S.
- Spouse: Michael Friedman

Education
- Education: Universidad Nacional de La Plata, University of California, Berkeley (PhD)
- Thesis: A Priori Knowledge (1983)
- Doctoral advisor: Barry Stroud

Philosophical work
- Era: Contemporary philosophy
- Region: Western philosophy
- School: Analytic philosophy
- Institutions: Stanford University
- Main interests: Early modern philosophy, history of analytic philosophy, David Hume, Immanuel Kant

Graciela De Pierris (Latin American Spanish: [ɡɾaˈsjela ðe ˈpjeris]; January 1, 1950 – August 20, 2024) was an Argentine-American philosopher and Clarence Irving Lewis Professor of Philosophy at Stanford University. She was known for her works on early modern philosophy.

== Books ==
- Ideas, Evidence, and Method, Oxford University Press 2015
