= Laura Ruetsche =

American philosopher

Laura Ruetsche is an American philosopher focusing on the foundations of quantum physics, feminist philosophy and philosophy of science. Ruetsche is a Professor and Chair of the department of philosophy at the University of Michigan. Her book, Interpreting Quantum Theories: The Art of the Possible was published in 2011 and received the 2013 Lakatos Award. She has also published on a diverse array of topics, exploring, among other things, philosophically salient differences between non-relativistic quantum mechanics and quantum field theory, modal semantics for quantum physics and virtue-epistemological theories of warrant. She is the partner of Gordon Belot also at the philosophy department of the University of Michigan.

== Education and career ==
Ruetsche graduated with a B.A. in Physics and Philosophy with a minor in Classical Greek from Carleton College. She went on to earn her B.Phil. in Philosophy at the University of Oxford, writing her thesis on Plato's Timeaus under the supervision of J. L. Ackrill. She then obtained her PhD at the University of Pittsburgh, writing her dissertation, entitled "On the Verge of Collapse: Modal Interpretations of Quantum Mechanics", under the supervision of John Earman.

She taught philosophy at Middlebury College from 1994 to 1996, before accepting a position at the University of Pittsburgh. Ruetsche held visiting appointments at Cornell University (Spring session, 1999) and at Rutgers University (2000–2001). Following a tenured position at Pittsburgh (1996–2008), she became the Professor of Philosophy at the University of Michigan in 2008. She currently holds the office of the Department Chair.

== Philosophical work ==
=== Interpreting Quantum Theories: The Art of the Possible ===
Ruetsche pursues three distinct tasks in this book. First, she offers an introduction to the conceptual foundations of the algebraic approaches i.e. generalisations of Hilbert spaces of ordinary quantum mechanics, that apply to systems with an infinite number of degrees of freedom (collectively referred to as QM-∞ by Ruetsche). Second, she offers a set of exegetical challenges raised by QM-∞. Third, Ruetsche manages to relate the interpretive problem besetting QM-∞ to the more general philosophical disputes concerning scientific realism. Her main contention, serving as a leitmotif for the whole book, is that no single interpretive strategy can fully accommodate the explanatory power of QM-∞, (call this contention Interpretive Pluralism [IP] ). Ruetsche isolates the total absence of any finite-dimensional projections from the algebras of linear operators of QM-∞ as presenting a distinctive interpretive problem for QM-∞ (QM-∞ differs from normal quantum theories whose algebras are equipped with linear operators that include such projections). Ruetsche also examines ontological commitments of the QM-∞ given the set algebraic formulation in order to determine whether they include elementary particles in a substantive sense of that phrase. In light of her investigations, Ruetsche ultimately offers a deflated particle ontology by anchoring the concept of a particle in phenomenological framework. She then proceeds to defend IP by exploiting the fact that macroscopically distinct equilibrium phases can co-exist given certain values of parameters of a quantum theory such as temperature.

=== Feminist epistemology ===
In her capacity as an epistemologist and a philosopher of science, Ruetsche is particularly concerned with reconciling traditional epistemologies with radical feminist epistemologies that locate gendered dimensions in the former's articulation of justification and norms. To that effect, she developed a virtue-epistemological model for a kind of epistemically valid warrant that agents can obtain "only through having lived types of contingent history'. In that Ruetsche follows Sandra Harding by homing in on the gendered status of epistemic agents. She also draws on theories of Aristotle, Wilfrid Sellars and John McDowell in order to broaden the extant conception of rationality in service of traditional epistemologies.

== Awards and fellowships ==
- Fellow of the American Association for the Advancement of Science, 2023
- Lakatos Award, 2013
- Fellow, Stanford Center for the Advanced Study of the Behavioral Sciences, 2006–2007
- Charles A. Ryskamp Fellowship (administered by the American Council of Learned Societies), 2002–2003

== Selected works ==
=== Books ===
- (2011a). Interpreting Quantum Theories: The Art of the Possible (Oxford University Press). ISBN 978-0-19-953540-8
