= Kathleen Akins =

Philosopher

Kathleen Akins is a Canadian philosopher who serves as the Professor of Philosophy at Simon Fraser University. She is James S. McDonnell Centennial Fellow in Philosophy of Science and a Burnaby Mountain Endowed Research Professor. Her primary area of research is Neurophilosophy, with her research goal as of 1999 being fostering better exchange between philosophy and neuroscience to see what can be revealed about "the nature of mind and its relation to the world."

She is particularly famous for two articles: "Of Sensory Systems and the "Aboutness" of Mental States" and "What is it like to be boring and myopic", a response to Nagel's "What is it like to be a bat?". In that article, Akins delves into bat physiology, arguing that much about bat subjectivity, such as the function of cortical activity profiles of the bat's brain, remains to be fleshed out in neuroscientific detail, and Nagel is too quick in ruling these out as answers to his central question.

In 2011, Akins wrote an essay for "Disabled Philosophers" detailing her experience with a severe form of arthritis, Ankylosing spondylitis, saying:

The nature and range of 'disability' is so vast that nothing about my own case necessarily generalizes to the experiences of other philosophers on this blog. Still, I think we really needed this forum if only to say "Hey, we're here. We contribute. We're a part of the profession. We're good citizens and good philosophers."

== Notable publications ==
- Brook, Andrew, and Kathleen Akins, eds. Cognition and the brain: The philosophy and neuroscience movement. Cambridge University Press, 2005. ISBN 978-0521836425
- Akins, Kathleen. "Of sensory systems and the "aboutness" of mental states." The Journal of Philosophy (1996): 337-372.
- Akins, Kathleen. "What is it Like to be Boring and Myopic?." (1993).
- Akins, Kathleen. "A Bat Without Qualities." Readings in Animal Cognition, MIT Press (1996): 344–358.
