= Hannah Ginsborg =

American academic

Academic background
- Education: University of Oxford (B.A.); Harvard University (PhD)
- Thesis: The Role of Taste in Kant's Theory of Cognition (1989)
- Doctoral advisor: Burton Dreben, John Rawls
- Other advisor: Michael Friedman

Hannah Ginsborg is a British-American philosopher who is Willis S and Marion Slusser Professor of Philosophy at the University of California, Berkeley.

== Education and career ==
She received a B.A. in Philosophy and Modern Languages (French) from the University of Oxford in 1980 and a Ph.D. in Philosophy from Harvard University in 1989. Her education included a year in Paris (1978-1979) studying logic and philosophy at the Université de Paris-I, and a year in Berlin (1985-1986) affiliated with the Free University of Berlin. Since 1988 she has been teaching at the University of California, Berkeley. In 2004-2005 she was a visiting scholar at the Max Planck Institute for the History of Science in Berlin. She spent the academic year 2010-2011 as a Fellow at the Wissenschaftskolleg in Berlin and the fall of 2014 as a Visiting Research Professor at LMU Munich.

She served as Chair of the Berkeley Philosophy Department from 2016 to 2019.

== Philosophical work ==
Much of Ginsborg's research, beginning with her 1989 doctoral thesis "The Role of Taste in Kant's Theory of Cognition," has been concerned with Immanuel Kant's Critique of Judgment. She has argued for the importance of the Critique of Judgment to Kant's theory of cognition and for the internal unity of the Critique of Judgment, which she sees as grounded in a notion of purposiveness as normativity. Within Kant's aesthetics, she has proposed a controversial interpretation of judgments of beauty as self-referential judgments which claim their own universal validity. This "austere" account rests on a distinctive notion of normativity – a normativity not based on rules or concepts—which also figures in her interpretation of Kant's theory of biology.

Since 2006 she has applied this notion of normativity to issues in the interpretation of Kant's Critique of Pure Reason, in particular questions about Kant's theory of perceptual experience and whether Kant was a nonconceptualist, and to issues in contemporary philosophy including the philosophy of perception, the theory of knowledge, and the philosophy of language and mind. She has argued that this notion of normativity, which she calls "primitive normativity," resolves the paradox about rule-following which Saul Kripke finds in Wittgenstein and helps makes sense of the controversial idea that meaning is normative.

Ginsborg has published two books, The Role of Taste in Kant's Theory of Cognition (Garland Press, 1990) and The Normativity of Nature: Essays on Kant's Critique of Judgement (Oxford University Press, 2015). She has also published articles in journals such as Nous, Ethics, The Journal of Philosophy, and Philosophy and Phenomenological Research, as well as book chapters and encyclopedia articles.

== Selected publications ==
- The role of taste in Kant's theory of cognition, 1998
- "Kant on understanding organisms as natural purposes", 2001
- "Thinking the particular as contained under the universal", 2006
- The normativity of nature : essays on Kant's Critique of judgement, 2014
