= History and Philosophy of the Life Sciences =

Academic journal

- Discipline: History of science Philosophy of science
- Language: English; French; German; Italian
- Edited by: Sabina Leonelli, Giovanni Boniolo

Publication details
- History: 1979–present
- Publisher: Springer Science+Business Media
- Frequency: Quarterly
- Impact factor: 0.559 (2017)

Standard abbreviations
- ISO 4: Hist. Philos. Life Sci.

Indexing
- ISSN: 0391-9714 (print); 1742-6316 (web)
- OCLC no.: 827256148

Links
- Journal homepage; Online archive

History and Philosophy of the Life Sciences is a quarterly peer-reviewed academic journal covering the history and philosophy of biology. It was established in 1979 and is published by Springer Science+Business Media. The editors in chief are Sabina Leonelli and Giovanni Boniolo. According to the Journal Citation Reports, the journal has a 2017 impact factor of 0.559.
