= Eric Winsberg =

American philosopher (born 1968)

- Born: February 4, 1968 (age 58)

Education
- Education: University of Chicago; Indiana University Bloomington
- Thesis: Simulation and the Philosophy of Science: Computationally Intensive Studies of Complex Physical Systems (1999)
- Doctoral advisor: Michael Friedman

Philosophical work
- Institutions: University of South Florida University of Cambridge
- Main interests: Philosophy of science, Philosophy of physics, Climate Science
- Notable works: Science in the Age of Computer Simulation; Philosophy and Climate Science

Eric Winsberg (born February 4, 1968) is an American philosopher who is a professor of philosophy at the University of South Florida. He holds a Global Professorship from the British Academy in the Department of History and Philosophy of Science at the University of Cambridge until 2027. He is known for his research in philosophy of science, in particular the philosophy of climate science, and the philosophy of physics. He is especially interested in the role of computer simulations in the physical sciences. His work in the philosophy of climate science specifically relates to its application in science policy and ethics. He was an early critic of many of the public health policies aimed at mitigating the Covid-19 pandemic, arguing that the quality of the science justifying these policies was poor or missing, and that many of the policies unnecessarily sacrificed the welfare of the young and the poor. He also writes on truth and on scientific authorship.

== Early life and education ==
Winsberg was born in New York City on February 4, 1968. His father was a physician and his mother was a data scientist. At an early age, his family moved to Montreal, where he spent most of his childhood. He attended college at The University of Chicago, and then earned his Ph.D, in History and Philosophy of Science at Indiana University Bloomington in 1999.

== Philosophical work ==
Winsberg wrote his doctoral dissertation on the use of computer simulation to study complex physical systems. Over the next several years, he published a number of articles on computer simulation, including their implications for understanding the nature of scientific theories and their application, scientific realism, the role of fiction in science, and the nature of inter-theoretic reduction. His work on computer simulation has been called "pioneering," "groundbreaking," and "trailblazing." He also contributed to the literature on the role of the thermodynamics for understanding the arrow of time. More recently he has devoted much of his attention to topics in climate science, especially the role of values therein, the importance of the chaotic nature of the atmosphere, the nature of probabilities and the role of robust results in climate modeling and climate science generally.

== Publications ==
=== Books ===
- Philosophy and Climate Science Cambridge University Press, 2018.
- Science in the age of computer simulation University of Chicago Press, 2010.
- Climate Modelling: Philosophical and Conceptual Issues, edited with Elisabeth Lloyd, Palgrave MacMillan, 2018.

=== Journal articles ===
- "Simulated Experiments: Methodology for a virtual World." Philosophy of Science 70: pages 105-125. 2003.
- "Sanctioning models: the epistemology of simulation." Science in Context 12: pages 275-202. 1999.
- "Simulations, models, and theories: Complex physical systems and their representations". Philosophy of Science 70, pages 105-125. 2001.
- "Severe weather event attribution: Why values won't go away." with Elisabeth Lloyd and Naomi Oreskes Studies in History and Philosophy of Science
