= David Malament =

American philosopher

David B. Malament
- Born: 21 December 1947 (age 78)
- Awards: Quantrell Award, Lakatos Award

Education
- Education: Columbia University (BA); Rockefeller University (PhD)
- Thesis: Does the causal structure of space-time determine its geometry (1975)
- Doctoral advisor: Donald A. Martin

Philosophical work
- Era: Contemporary philosophy
- Region: Western philosophy
- School: Analytic philosophy
- Doctoral students: Jeremy Butterfield; JB Manchak; James Owen Weatherall
- Main interests: Philosophy of physics
- Website: https://faculty.sites.uci.edu/malament/

David B. Malament (born 21 December 1947) is an American philosopher of science specializing in the philosophy of physics.

== Biography ==
Malament attended Stuyvesant High School and received a B.A. degree in mathematics in 1968 from Columbia University and a Ph.D. degree in philosophy in 1975 from Rockefeller University. After teaching for nearly a quarter-century at the University of Chicago, Malament left to become Distinguished Professor of Logic and Philosophy of Science at the University of California, Irvine, where he is now emeritus. His book Topics in the Foundations of General Relativity and Newtonian Gravitation Theory (Chicago, 2012) was awarded the 2014 Lakatos Award.

Malament's work focuses the conceptual foundations of the special and general theories of relativity. Regarding whether simultaneity in special relativity, the Einstein synchronisation is conventional, Malament argues against conventionalism and is regarded by some as having refuted Adolf Grünbaum's argument for conventionalism. Grünbaum, as well as Sahotra Sarkar and John Stachel, don't agree, whereas Robert Rynasiewicz sides with Malament.

During the Vietnam War Malament was a conscientious objector to the draft, spending time in jail for refusing induction into the military. He was in the same jail as the Berrigan Brothers, and bunked with Phillip Berrigan. He published an article on the subject of selective conscientious objection in an early issue of the journal Philosophy and Public Affairs.

He received the Quantrell Award.
