= Fernando Gil International Prize for the Philosophy of Science =

The Fernando Gil International Prize for the Philosophy of Science, named after the Portuguese philosopher Fernando Gil, is an award of the Portuguese government for "work of particular excellence in the domain of the Philosophy of Science, whether regarding general epistemological problems or particular scientific areas". It includes a monetary reward of €75 000.

== Winners ==
- 2010: Ladislav Kvasz (cs), Slovakia
- 2011: Niccolò Guicciardini, Italy
- 2013: Hasok Chang, United Kingdom
- 2015: Michael Friedman, United States
- 2017: Emily Grosholz, United States
- 2019: Adrian Currie, United Kingdom
