= Mazviita Chirimuuta =

Dr Mazviita Chirimuuta
- Occupation: Senior Lecturer
- Awards: Lakatos Award, Nayef Al-Rodhan Book Prize

Academic background
- Education: University of Bristol (BA / BSc) University of Cambridge (PhD)

Academic work
- Discipline: Philosopher
- Sub-discipline: Philosophy of science, neuroscience, colour perception, realism and anti-realism
- Institutions: University of Edinburgh

Mazviita Chirimuuta is a British philosopher of science primarily working in topics of neuroscience and colour perception within the realism / anti-realism debate. She is a Senior Lecturer at the University of Edinburgh, having previously held positions at Monash University, Washington University in St. Louis, and the University of Pittsburgh.

== Education and career ==
Chirimuuta completed her undergraduate studies in philosophy and psychology at the University of Bristol, continuing on to complete a PhD at the University of Cambridge in 2004 on visual neuroscience.

== Awards and honours ==
In 2025, Chirimuuta's book The Brain Abstracted: Simplification in the History and Philosophy of Neuroscience (2024) was awarded the Lakatos Award by the London School of Economics and Political Science, awarded for excellent contribution to the philosophy of science. The Brain Abstracted is also the recipient of the Nayef Al-Rodhan Book Prize from The Royal Institute of Philosophy.

== Bibliography ==
=== Books ===
- Chririmuuta, M. 2024. The Brain Abstracted: Simplification in the History and Philosophy of Neuroscience. The MIT Press.
- Chririmuuta, M. 2017. Outside Color: Perceptual Science and the Puzzle of Color in Philosophy. The MIT Press.

=== Journal articles and book chapters ===
- Chirimuuta, M., and D. J. Tolhurst. 1996. “Natural Scenes and the Dipper Function.” In Perception, edited by Enrique Villanueva, 33–176. Ridgeview Pub. Co.
- Chirimuuta, M, and David Tolhurst. 2005. “Does a Bayesian Model of V1 Contrast Coding Offer a Neurophysiological Account of Human Contrast Discrimination?”
- Chirimuuta, M, and David Tolhurst. 2005. “Accuracy of Identification of Grating Contrast by Human Observers: Bayesian Models of V1 Contrast Processing Show Correspondence Between Discrimination and Identification Performance.”
- Chirimuuta, M. 2008. “Reflectance Realism and Colour Constancy: What Would Count as Scientific Evidence for Hilbert's Ontology of Colour?” Australasian Journal of Philosophy 86 (4): 563–82.
- Chirimuuta, M., and I. Gold. 2009. “The Embedded Neuron, the Enactive Field?” In The Oxford Handbook of Philosophy and Neuroscience, edited by John Bickle. Oxford University Press.
- Chirimuuta, M. 2010. “The Red and the Real: An Essay on Color Ontology.” International Studies in the Philosophy of Science 24 (3): 339–42.
- Chirimuuta, M. 2013. “Extending, Changing, and Explaining the Brain.” Biology and Philosophy 28 (4): 613–38.
- Chirimuuta, M. 2014. “Psychophysical Methods and the Evasion of Introspection.” Philosophy of Science 81 (5): 914–26.
- Chirimuuta, M, and Mark Paterson. 2014. “A Methodological Molyneux Question.” In Perception and Its Modalities, edited by Dustin Stokes, Mohan Matthen, and Stephen Biggs, 410–31. OUP Usa.
- Chirimuuta, M. 2014. “Minimal Models and Canonical Neural Computations: The Distinctness of Computational Explanation in Neuroscience.” Synthese 191 (2): 127–53.
- Paterson, Mark, and Mazviita Chirimuuta. 2014. “A Methodological Molyneux Question: Sensory Substitution, Plasticity and the Unification of Perceptual Theory.” In , edited by Dustin Stokes, Mohan Matthen, and Stephen Biggs, 410–30. Oxford University Press.
- Chirimuuta, M. 2015. “The Self Locating Property Theory of Color.” Minds and Machines 25 (2): 133–47.
- Chirimuuta, M. 2015. Outside Color: Perceptual Science and the Puzzle of Color in Philosophy. The MIT Press.
- Chirimuuta, M., and F. A. A. Kingdom. 2015. “The Uses of Colour Vision: Ornamental, Practical, and Theoretical.” Minds and Machines 25 (2): 213–29.
- Chirimuuta, M. 2015. “Editorial for Minds and Machines Special Issue on Philosophy of Colour.” Minds and Machines 25 (2): 123–32.
- Chirimuuta, M. 2016. “Perceptual Pragmatism and the Naturalized Ontology of Color.” Topics in Cognitive Science 8 (4).
- Chirimuuta, M. 2016. “Why the ‘Stimulus Error’ Did Not Go Away.” Studies in History and Philosophy of Science Part A 56: 33–42.
- Chirimuuta, M. 2016. “Vision, Perspctivism, and Haptic Realism.” Philosophy of Science 83 (5): 746–56.
- Chirimuuta, M. 2017. “Précis of Outside Color.” Philosophy and Phenomenological Research 95 (1): 215–22.
- Chirimuuta, M. 2017. “Hughlings Jackson and the ‘Doctrine of Concomitance’: Mind Brain Theorising Between Metaphysics and the Clinic.” History and Philosophy of the Life Sciences 39 (3): 26.
- Chirimuuta, M. 2017. “Replies.” Philosophy and Phenomenological Research 95 (1): 244–55.
- Chirimuuta, M. 2017. “Perceptual Pragmatism and the Naturalized Ontology of Color.” Topics in Cognitive Science 9 (1): 151–71.
- Chirimuuta, M. 2017. “Crash Testing an Engineering Framework in Neuroscience: Does the Idea of Robustness Break Down?” Philosophy of Science 84 (5): 1140–51.
- Chirimuuta, M. 2018. “The Development and Application of Efficient Coding Explanation in Neuroscience.” In Explanation Beyond Causation: Philosophical Perspectives on Non-Causal Explanations, edited by Alexander Reutlinger and Juha Saatsi, 164–84. Oxford University Press.
- Chirimuuta, M. 2018. “Marr, Mayr, and Mr: What Functionalism Should Now Be About.” Philosophical Psychology 31 (3): 403–18.
- Chirimuuta, M. 2018. “Explanation in Computational Neuroscience: Causal and Non Causal.” British Journal for the Philosophy of Science 69 (3): 849–80.
- Springle, A, Declan Smithies, Susanna Siegel, Raja Rosenhagen, Mazviita Chirimuuta, and Ori Beck. 2018. “Discussion of Susanna Siegel's ‘Can Perceptual Experiences Be Rational?’” Analytic Philosophy 59 (1): 175–90.
- Chirimuuta, M. 2019. “Synthesis of Contraries: Hughlings Jackson on Sensory Motor Representation in the Brain.” Studies in History and Philosophy of Science Part C: Studies in History and Philosophy of Biological and Biomedical Sciences 75: 34–44.
- Chirimuuta, M. 2020. “Cassirer and Goldstein on Abstraction and the Autonomy of Biology.” Hopos: The Journal of the International Society for the History of Philosophy of Science 10 (2): 471–503.
- Chirimuuta, M. 2020. “Prediction Versus Understanding in Computationally Enhanced Neuroscience.” Synthese 199 (1-2): 767–90.
- Chirimuuta, M. 2020. “The Reflex Machine and the Cybernetic Brain: The Critique of Abstraction and Its Application to Computationalism.” Perspectives on Science 28 (3): 421–57.
- Chirimuuta, M. 2020. “Naturalism and the Philosophy of Colour Ontology and Perception.” Philosophy Compass 15 (2): e12649.
- Chirimuuta, M. 2021. “Reflex Theory, Cautionary Tale: Misleading Simplicity in Early Neuroscience.” Synthese 199 (5-6): 12731–51.
- Chirimuuta, M. 2022. “X—Disjunctivism and Cartesian Idealization.” Proceedings of the Aristotelian Society 122 (3): 218–38.
- Chirimuuta, M. 2022. “The Case for Medium Dependence: Comment on Neurocognitive Mechanisms by Gualtiero Piccinini.” Journal of Consciousness Studies 29 (7-8): 185–94.
- Chirimuuta, M. 2023. “Haptic Realism for Neuroscience.” Synthese 202 (3): 1–16.
- Chirimuuta, M. 2023. “The Critical Difference Between Holism and Vitalism in Cassirer’s Philosophy of Science.” In Vitalism and Its Legacy in Twentieth Century Life Sciences and Philosophy, edited by Christopher Donohue and Charles T. Wolfe, 85–105. Springer Verlag.
- Chirimuuta, M. 2024. “Critical Realism and Technocracy – Rw Sellars’ Radical Philosophy in Its Context.” Topoi 43 (1): 147–60.
- Chirimuuta, M. 2024. “From Analogies to Levels of Abstraction in Cognitive Neuroscience.” In Levels of Explanation, edited by Katie Robertson and Alastair Wilson, 200–221. Oxford University Press.
- Chirimuuta, M. 2024. “Empiricism Reformed.” In Empirical Reason and Sensory Experience, edited by Ori Beck and Miloš Vuletić, 43–53. Springer Verlag.
- Chirimuuta, M. 2025. “Physiology and the Problem of Mind and Life.” In The Early Years of Mind: Making Contemporary Philosophy and Psychology, edited by Lukas M. Verburgt, 126–45. Oxford University Press.
