= Sabina Leonelli =

Philosopher of science

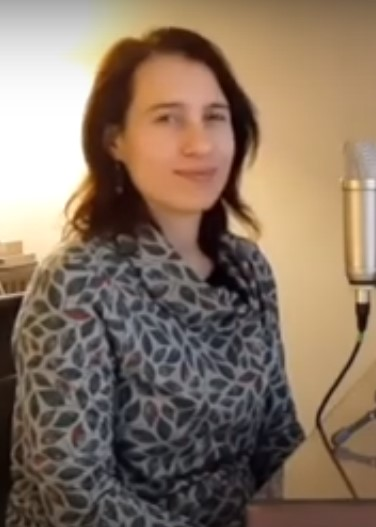
- Leonelli in 2020
- Scientific career
- Fields: Philosophy of Science
- Institutions: University of Exeter; Alan Turing Institute; Konrad Lorenz Institute for Evolution and Cognition Research
- Website: experts.exeter.ac.uk/363-sabina-leonelli

Sabina Leonelli is a philosopher of science and professor at the Technical University of Munich, Germany. She is well known for her work on scientific practices, data-centric science, and open science policies. She was awarded the 2018 Lakatos Award for her book Data-Centric Biology: A Philosophical Study (2016).

== Biography ==
Originally from Italy, Leonelli moved to the UK for a B.Sc. degree in history, Philosophy and Social Studies of Science at University College London and an M.Sc. degree in History and Philosophy of Science at the London School of Economics. Her doctoral research was carried out in the Netherlands at the Vrije Universiteit Amsterdam with Henk W. de Regt and Hans Radder. Before joining the Exeter faculty, she was a research officer under Mary S. Morgan at the Department of Economic History of the London School of Economics.

Leonelli is the co-director of the Exeter Centre for the Study of the Life Sciences (Egenis) and a Turing Fellow at the Alan Turing Institute in London. She is also Editor-in-Chief of the international journal History and Philosophy of the Life Sciences and Associate Editor for the Harvard Data Science Review. She serves as External Faculty for the Konrad Lorenz Institute for Evolution and Cognition Research.

Since 2024, Leonelli is Professor for Philosophy and History of Science and Technology at the Technical University of Munich.

== Involvement in science policy ==
Leonelli is currently an ambassador of Plan S, an open-access science publishing initiative supported by cOAlition S. From 2015 to 2017, Leonelli led the Open Science working group of the Global Young Academy, and from 2016 to 2019 represented the GYA on the Open Science Policy Platform of the European Commission. In 2016, she co-chaired the production of the Open Data Position Statement by the GYA and European Young Academies and in 2018, co-authored the GYA Statement on Plan S.

== Recognition ==
Leonelli was awarded with the 2018 Lakatos award for Data-Centric Biology: A Philosophical Study (2016), a book on the use of data and databases in contemporary biological research practices.

She was elected to the Academia Europaea in 2021.

== Media appearances ==
=== Podcasts ===
- Technoculture Podcast – Episode #9: Sabina Leonelli on the Open Science Movement
- Oxford Internet Institute Podcast on "Researching Life in the Digital Age: A Philosophical Analysis of Data-Intensive Biology"
- The Dissenter Podcast on Science in the World of Big Data
- SCI PHI Podcast

== Grants and projects ==
- From 2019 to 2021: Turing Project "From Field Data to Global Indicators: Towards a Framework for Intelligent Plant Data Linkage"
- From 2016 to 2020: Australian Research Council Discovery Grant "Organisms and Us: How Living Things Help Us to Understand Our World," led by Rachel Ankeny
- From 2018 to 2021: Economic and Social Research Council Research Grant "Understanding the Use of Digital Forensics in Policing in England and Wales," led by Dana Wilson-Kovacs
- From 2019 to 2023: Engineering and Physical Sciences Research Council Doctoral Training Centre on Environmental Intelligence, led by Gavin Shaddik
- From 2014 to 2019: European Research Council Starting Grant on The Epistemology of Data-Intensive Science (DATA_SCIENCE).

== Selected publications ==
- Stanford Encyclopedia of Philosophy article 'Scientific Research and Big Data'
- Model Organisms (2020) with Rachel Ankeny. ISBN 978-1-108-74232-0
- Data Journeys in the Sciences (2020), Editors: Leonelli, Sabina, Tempini, Niccolò (Eds.). ISBN 978-3-030-37177-7
- Data-Centric Biology: A Philosophical Study (2016). ISBN 978-0-226-41633-5
