= Richard Bradley (philosopher) =

South African philosopher (born 1964)

Richard Bradley FBA (born 13 December 1964) is a South African philosopher. He is a professor at the London School of Economics and Political Science, a project leader at the Centre for Philosophy of Natural and Social Science, and the former editor of the journal Economics and Philosophy.

Bradley is best known for work on decision theory, formal epistemology, semantics, and climate change policy. His PhD thesis began his work on decisions involving conditional attitudes, which culminates in his 2017 book Decision Theory with a Human Face.

On 22 July 2022, Bradley was elected a Fellow of the British Academy (FBA), the United Kingdom's national academy for the humanities and social sciences.

== Biography ==
Bradley attended the University of Witwatersrand studying economics, politics and sociology. He holds an MSc in Social Philosophy from the LSE and completed his doctorate at the University of Chicago, under the supervision of Richard Jeffrey and David Malament.

== Selected publications ==
- Bradley, Richard (11 October 2017). Decision Theory with a Human Face. Cambridge University Press. doi:10.1017/9780511760105. ISBN 978-1-107-00321-7.
- Bradley, R.; List, C. (1 January 2009). "Desire-as-belief revisited". Analysis. 69 (1). Oxford University Press (OUP): 31–37. doi:10.1093/analys/ann005. ISSN 0003-2638.
- Bradley, Richard (10 May 2007). "The kinematics of belief and desire". Synthese. 156 (3). Springer Science and Business Media LLC: 513–535. doi:10.1007/s11229-006-9136-7. ISSN 0039-7857. S2CID 17765767.
- Bradley, R. (1 January 2007). "A Defence of the Ramsey Test". Mind. 116 (461). Oxford University Press (OUP): 1–21. doi:10.1093/mind/fzm001. ISSN 0026-4423.
- Bradley, Richard (23 June 2005). "Ramsey's Representation Theorem". Dialectica. 58 (4). Verein philosophie.ch: 483–497. doi:10.1111/j.1746-8361.2004.tb00320.x. ISSN 0012-2017.
- Bradley, Richard (1998). "A representation theorem for a decision theory with conditionals". Synthese. 116 (2). Springer Science and Business Media LLC: 187–229. doi:10.1023/a:1005030124500. ISSN 0039-7857. S2CID 40941621.
