= Jeffrey Bub =

Physicist and philosopher of science

Jeffrey Bub (born 1942) is a physicist and philosopher of physics, and Distinguished Professor in the department of philosophy at the University of Maryland, College Park.

== Education ==
He obtained his bachelor's degree in pure mathematics and physics from the University of Cape Town. A scholarship allowed him to work at Birkbeck College with David Bohm who had profound intellectual influence on his work. Bub obtained his PhD in Mathematical Physics from University of London in 1966. Before taking up his position as professor at the University of Maryland in 1986, he worked at the University of Minnesota, Yale University, Tel Aviv University, and the University of Western Ontario. He has been visiting professor at Princeton University, Yale University, the University of California, Irvine, the CPNSS at the London School of Economics, the University of California, San Diego, the Perimeter Institute for Theoretical Physics, and the Institute for Quantum Optics and Quantum Information at the University of Vienna.

His main research interests relate to quantum foundations, quantum information, quantum computing, and quantum cryptography. In 1998, his book Interpreting the Quantum World won the Lakatos Award. In 2005 he received the University of Maryland's Kirwan Faculty Research and Scholarship Prize for his work in the area of quantum foundations and quantum information.

Bub has published over 100 scientific articles; the first of these are three articles authored together with David Bohm and published in 1966 and 1968. In 2010, he published an argument that the famous work of John Stewart Bell (and, thus, Grete Hermann) had misconstrued John von Neumann's no hidden variables proof of the impossibility of hidden variables in quantum mechanics. The validity of Bub's argument is, in turn, disputed.

== Works ==
- Bananaworld: Quantum Mechanics for Primates, Oxford University Press, 2016, ISBN 978-0-19-871853-6
- Interpreting the Quantum World, Cambridge University Press, 1997, ISBN 978-0-521-65386-2 (revised paperback edition, 1999) – Review by Kent A. Peacock
- The Interpretation of Quantum Mechanics (The Western Ontario Series in Philosophy of Science), Springer, 1974, ISBN 978-90-277-0465-8
- Totally Random:Why Nobody Understands Quantum Mechanics (A Serious Comic on Entanglement). Princeton University Press. 2018. ISBN 978-0-691-17695-6.
