= Elisabeth Lloyd =

American philosopher of biology

Elisabeth Anne Lloyd (born September 3, 1956) is an American philosopher of science specialising in the philosophy of biology. She is currently Distinguished Professor of History and Philosophy of Science and Medicine - as well as Adjunct Professor of biology - at Indiana University, Bloomington, affiliated faculty scholar at the Kinsey Institute and Adjunct Faculty at the Center for the Integrative Study of Animal Behavior.

== Education and career ==
Lloyd was born in Morristown, New Jersey, and earned her BA in science and political theory from University of Colorado, Boulder in 1980, summa cum laude. Lloyd studied under Bas van Fraassen at Princeton University for a PhD in philosophy 1980 – 1984. While a student at Princeton, she spent a year (1983) studying with Richard C. Lewontin at Harvard's Museum of Comparative Zoology.

She worked as an assistant professor in the Department of Philosophy at University of California, San Diego, 1985–88; and then was assistant professor, then associate professor, then full professor in the Department of Philosophy at the University of California, Berkeley from 1988 to 1999, before moving to Indiana University.

In 2022, she was elected a Fellow of the American Academy of Arts & Sciences.

== Philosophical work ==
Her 2005 book, The Case of the Female Orgasm, was widely discussed in the scholarly and popular press, including Isis, Nature and The New York Times. The book criticizes what it portrays as anti-scientific biases infecting the many proposed adaptive explanations of female orgasm. Lloyd goes on to argue that the available evidence, such as from sexology studies, is far more supportive of a neutral "byproduct" explanation put forward by Donald Symons, under which female orgasm is the result of orgasm developing as a species trait due to its critical role in males for procreation (akin to explanations for why nipples, which are required for nursing in females, are also present in males). The book received so much attention that it was lampooned on an episode of Saturday Night Live because its title sounds like a racy version of a Hardy Boys novel. Lloyd had been working on the subject for two years, when a discussion with Stephen Jay Gould in 1986 led to her providing the basis for his 1987 essay in Natural History titled 'Freudian Slip', which was reprinted in 1992 as 'Male Nipples and Clitoral Ripples.'

In 2001, Michigan Law Review published her essay "Science Gone Astray: Evolution and Rape" that criticized Randy Thornhill and Craig T. Palmer's famous work A Natural History of Rape for "glaring flaws in their science."

== Bibliography ==
- The Structure and Confirmation of Evolutionary Theory, Greenwood Press, 1988 (Reprinted Princeton University Press, 1994 ISBN 0-691-00046-8).
- Keywords in Evolutionary Biology (co-edited with Evelyn Fox Keller), Harvard University Press, 1992 (reprinted 1998 ISBN 0-674-50313-9).
- The Case of the Female Orgasm: Bias in the Science of Evolution, Harvard University Press, 2005 (new edition, 2006 ISBN 0-674-02246-7).
- Science, Politics and Evolution, Cambridge University Press, 2008 (ISBN 9780521865708).
- Climate Modelling: Philosophical and Conceptual Issues (co-edited with Eric Winsberg) Palgrave MacMillan, 2018

== See also ==
- American philosophy
- Evolutionary psychology
- List of American philosophers
- Sexual selection in human evolution
