= Andrew Janiak =

American philosopher

Andrew Janiak is an American philosopher who is professor of philosophy at Duke University, where he co-leads Project Vox and formerly directed the Graduate Program in History and Philosophy of Science.

He received a Bachelor of Arts from Hampshire College in 1994, Master of Arts from the University of Michigan in 1996 and a Ph.D. from Indiana University Bloomington in 2001. His dissertation was directed by Michael Friedman. He received the Richard K. Lublin Distinguished Award for Teaching Excellence in 2009.

Janiak writes on the philosophy of science, philosophy of physics, and the history of modern philosophy, especially on the philosophical works of Émilie_du_Châtelet and Isaac Newton. He is the author of two monographs that concern Isaac Newton's influence of modern philosophy, Newton as Philosopher and Newton. His most recent book is The Enlightenment's Most Dangerous Woman, published by Oxford University Press (2024), which concerns Du Châtelet's thought and the creation of the modern philosophy canon. In The New Yorker, Adam Gopnik reviewed the book and considered its principal arguments and claims in some detail.

Janiak has served on more than three dozen PhD dissertation committees over the past twenty years. Janiak served as dissertation advisor for Matthew C. Harris, who was taken into custody after making threats against his former employer, University of California, Los Angeles. As the Courthouse News Service reported in 2024, Harris was later found not guilty by reason of insanity.
