= Robert Rynasiewicz =

Robert Rynasiewicz is a professor of philosophy at Johns Hopkins University and an adjunct professor in philosophy and the Committee on History and Philosophy of Science at the University of Maryland.

Rynasiewicz earned his ScB. in physics from Brown University, and his PhD from the University of Minnesota. He has held NSF, NEH, and Mellon fellowships.

His research interests include Philosophy of Physics, Logic, Philosophy of Language, and Philosophy of psychology. His publications have chiefly addressed the history and foundations of space-time physics.
