= Michael Friedman (philosopher) =

American philosopher (1947–2025)

- Born: April 2, 1947; Brookline, Massachusetts, U.S.
- Died: March 24, 2025 (aged 77); Stanford, California, U.S.
- Spouse: Graciela De Pierris
- Awards: Matchette Prize, Lakatos Award, Humboldt Research Award

Education
- Education: Queens College, City University of New York; Princeton University (PhD)
- Thesis: Foundations of Space-Time Theories (1972)
- Doctoral advisor: Clark Glymour; Carl Hempel
- Other advisor: Burton Dreben

Philosophical work
- Era: Contemporary philosophy
- Region: Western philosophy
- School: Analytic philosophy
- Institutions: Harvard University, University of Pennsylvania, University of Illinois at Chicago, Indiana University, UC Berkeley, University of Western Ontario, University of Konstanz
- Doctoral students: Andrew Janiak, Eric Winsberg
- Main interests: Philosophy of science, philosophy of physics, history of philosophy, Kantianism
- Notable ideas: Dynamics of reason, retrospective communicative rationality, relativized (constitutive) a priori principles as paradigms

Michael Friedman (April 2, 1947 – March 24, 2025) was an American philosopher who was Emeritus Patrick Suppes Professor of Philosophy of Science and Professor, by courtesy, of German Studies at Stanford University. Friedman was best known for his work in the philosophy of science, especially on scientific explanation and the philosophy of physics, and for his historical work on Immanuel Kant. Friedman has done historical work on figures in continental philosophy such as Martin Heidegger and Ernst Cassirer. He also served as the co-director of the Program in History and Philosophy of Science and Technology at Stanford University.

== Education and career ==
Friedman earned his BA from Queens College, City University of New York in 1969 and his PhD from Princeton University in 1973. Before moving to Stanford in 2002, Friedman taught at Harvard University, the University of Pennsylvania, the University of Illinois at Chicago, Indiana University, and UC Berkeley as a visiting professor.

Friedman was a Fellow of the American Academy of Arts & Sciences from 1997 until his death in 2025. In 2024 he was elected an honorary member of the International Academy of Philosophy of Science (AIPS). Four of his articles have been selected as among the "ten best" of their year by The Philosopher's Annual.

== Philosophical work ==
Friedman's early work was on the nature of scientific explanation and the philosophy of physics. His first book, Foundations of Space-Time Theories, was published by Princeton University Press in 1983 won the Matchette Prize (now known as the Book Prize) from the American Philosophical Association, to recognize work by a younger scholar. It also won the Lakatos Award from the London School of Economics to recognize outstanding work in philosophy of science.

Kant and the Exact Sciences was described in Philosophical Review as "a very important book," "required reading for researchers on the relation between the exact sciences and Kant's philosophy."

UC Berkeley German philosophy professor Hans Sluga described Friedman's 2000 book A Parting of the Ways: Carnap, Cassirer, and Heidegger, a book that detailed the philosophies of Carnap, Cassirer, and Heidegger, as "eye-opening" and "ambitious". The book shed new light on the split between analytic philosophy and Continental philosophy.

In his book Dynamics of Reason, Friedman "provides the fullest account to date not only of [his] neo-Kantian, historicized, dynamical conception of relativized a priori principles of mathematics and physics, but also of the pivotal role that [he] sees philosophy as playing in making scientific revolutions rational."

In 2015, he was awarded the Fernando Gil International Prize for the Philosophy of Science for his book Kant's Construction of Nature.

Friedman was an honorary professor at the University of Western Ontario.

== Personal life and death ==
Friedman was married to Graciela De Pierris, a professor of philosophy at Stanford who has published work on early modern philosophy.

Friedman died in Stanford on March 24, 2025, at the age of 77.

== Selected publications ==
=== Books ===
- Foundations of Space-Time Theories: Relativistic Physics and the Philosophy of Science (Princeton University Press, 1983)
- Kant and the Exact Sciences (Harvard University Press, 1992)
- Reconsidering Logical Positivism (Cambridge University Press, 1999)
- A Parting of the Ways: Carnap, Cassirer, and Heidegger (Open Court, 2000)
- Dynamics of Reason: The 1999 Kant Lectures at Stanford University (CSLI/University of Chicago Press, 2001)
- Immanuel Kant: Metaphysical Foundations of Natural Science (Cambridge University Press, 2004) (editor)
- The Kantian Legacy in Nineteenth-Century Science (MIT Press, 2006) (co-editor with Alfred Nordmann)
- The Cambridge Companion to Carnap (2007) (co-editor with Richard Creath)
- Kant's Construction of Nature: A Reading of the Metaphysical Foundations of Natural Science (Cambridge University Press, 2013)

=== Journal articles ===
- Friedman, Michael (June 1998). "Kantian themes in contemporary philosophy". Proceedings of the Aristotelian Society, Supplementary Volumes. 72 (1): 111–130. doi:10.1111/1467-8349.00038. JSTOR 4107015.
