= John McCaskill =

Australian chemist

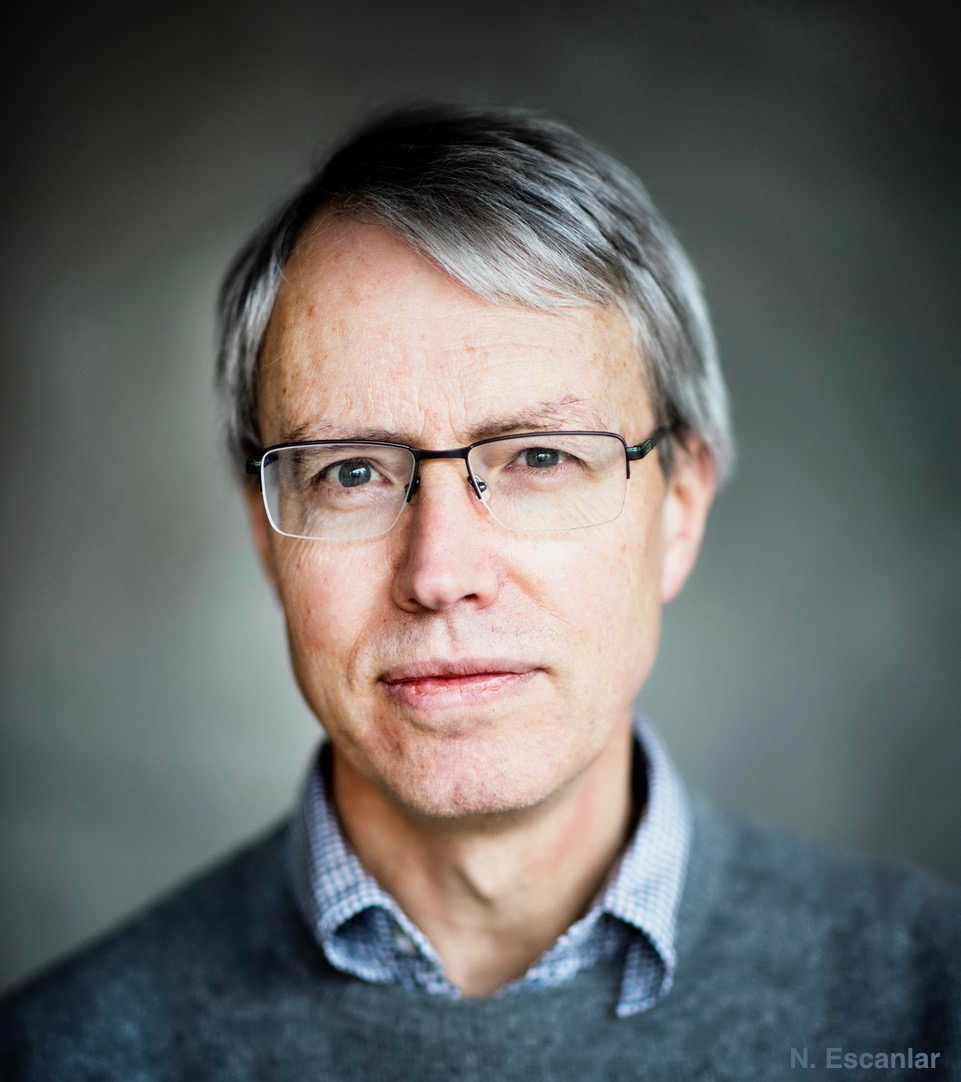
- Born: 1957 (age 68–69); Australia
- Education: University of Sydney
- Occupation: Chemist
- Known for: Information processing in evolving and self-organizing molecular systems

John S. McCaskill (born 1957) is an Australian chemist who works on the evolution of information processing in a wide variety of fields ranging from theoretical biochemistry to novel computation to artificial life and microrobotics.

== Biography ==
After graduating from Sydney University in 1978 (R. G. Gilbert advisor) and obtaining his PhD (D. Phil.) in 1982 as a Rhodes Scholar at New College, Oxford, McCaskill joined the group of Nobel prize-winner Manfred Eigen at the Max Planck Institute for Biophysical Chemistry in Göttingen, Germany. He became Professor for Theoretical Biochemistry at the Friedrich Schiller University Jena in 1992, founding a multidisciplinary research group in Biomolecular Information Processing (BioMIP) at the Institute for Molecular Biotechnology (imb Jena), a field which he pioneered for 25 years while holding positions at the GMD (National Research Center for Information Technology), the Fraunhofer Society, Ruhr University Bochum, the Santa Fe Institute, and the European Centre for Living Technology at the Ca' Foscari University of Venice.

== Research ==
McCaskill is best known for his work on information processing in evolving and self-organizing molecular systems, spanning theoretical and experimental approaches that include novel devices and systems. His early work on molecular evolution was theoretical, using non-equilibrium statistical mechanics to solve Eigen’s equations of molecular quasispecies for realistic fitness landscapes . He developed an ensemble approach to RNA structure prediction, now in wide use, and made several contributions, both theoretical and experimental, to the study of spatially-resolved molecular evolution, including the experimental implementation of spatially-resolved capillary and microfluidic flow reactors and also including the construction of NGEN and MEREGEN, large-scale reconfigurable systolic computers for simulating spatial evolution based on reprogrammable FPGA hardware

Since 2000, he has established a chemical microprocessor technology for electronically programmable matter via microscale electrochemistry, and applied it to the development of novel approaches towards artificial cells and DNA/RNA processing systems, including in vitro DNA/RNA processing systems, including Qß RNA, 3SR, SDA, 3SR-Predator-Prey , CATCH and optical DNA Computing systems based on magnetic beads in microfluidic reactors McCaskill led an international initiative to investigate evolvable artificial chemical cells with an EU-funded project, PACE, one of the earliest projects to explore a bottom-up approach to create an artificial living cell . Most recently his research has led to the development of novel autonomous and programmable electronic-chemical systems, leading other EU-funded projects, ECCell and MICREAgents, and opening a wide range of potential applications in basic and applied research.

McCaskill's current work includes modeling the essential interplay of self-organization and evolution in life-like chemical and electronic systems, and exploring the potential of electronic-chemical hybrid Information Technology based on these properties. He has produced over 100 scientific publications, taught courses and supervised PhD theses in disciplines ranging from chemistry, physics and biology to computer science, and his multidisciplinary work straddling theory and experiment has been recognized in invited lectures at international conferences around the world. He was an inaugural director of the European Centre for Living Technology, and has since served on its science board. While McCaskill's main work is in basic science, it has helped spawn several start-up companies and continues to involve the coordination of major collaborative projects fostering novel links between science and industry.
