= Nicholas Shea =

British philosopher

- Occupations: Philosopher, professor
- Awards: Lakatos Award

Education
- Education: King's College London (PhD), Birkbeck, University of London (MA)

Philosophical work
- Era: 21st-century philosophy
- Region: Western philosophy
- School: Analytic
- Institutions: Institute of Philosophy, University of London, King’s College, London
- Main interests: philosophy of science
- Website: https://www.nicholasshea.co.uk/

Nicholas Shea is a British philosopher and Professor of Philosophy at the Institute of Philosophy, University of London. He is known for his work on philosophy of cognitive science, particularly on mental representation, concepts, and the philosophy of mind. Shea is a winner of the Lakatos Award for his contributions to the philosophy of science.

== Books ==
- Concepts at the Interface, Oxford University Press, 2024
- Representation in Cognitive Science, Oxford University Press, 2018 (winner of the Lakatos Award 2020)
- On Millikan, Wadsworth, 2004
