= Leo Buss =

Evolutionary biologist

Leo W. Buss
- Born: 1953 (age 72–73)
- Education: Johns Hopkins University
- Scientific career
- Thesis: Competition on marine hard-substrata : pattern, process and mechanism (1980)

Leo W. Buss (born 1953) is a retired Professor at Yale University's departments of geology, geophysics, and ecology and evolutionary biology.

== Life ==
He graduated from Johns Hopkins University with a B.A., M.A., and Ph.D in 1979.

His evolutionary developmental biology book approaches the subject of the evolution of metazoan development from a cell lineage selection point of view. He reevaluates August Weismann's model of the cell compartmentalization of somatic and germline cell lineages (see Weismann barrier), and argues that the vision of the individual taken by the modern synthesis is insufficient to explain the early evolution of development or ontogeny.

He collaborated with Walter Fontana in producing some of the first papers on artificial chemistries.

== Works ==
- The Evolution of Individuality, Princeton University Press, 1987, ISBN 978-0-691-08468-8
- "Beyond Digital Naturalism", Artificial life: an overview, Editor Christopher G. Langton, MIT Press, 1997, ISBN 978-0-262-62112-0
- "What would be conserved "If the tape were played twice?"", Complexity: metaphors, models, and reality, Editors George A. Cowan, David Pines, David Elliott Meltzer, Westview Press, 1999, ISBN 978-0-7382-0232-7
- "Growth by Intussusception in Hyrdactiniid Hydroids", Evolutionary patterns: growth, form, and tempo in the fossil record in honor of Allan Cheetham, Editors Alan H. Cheetham, Jeremy B. C. Jackson, Scott Lidgard, Frank Kenneth McKinney, University of Chicago Press, 2001, ISBN 978-0-226-38931-8
