= Richard Healey (philosopher) =

American philosopher

- Awards: Lakatos Award

Philosophical work
- Era: 21st-century philosophy
- Region: Western philosophy
- Institutions: University of Arizona
- Main interests: philosophy of science, metaphysics
- Website: https://sites.google.com/view/richard-healey/home

Richard Healey is an American philosopher and Professor of Philosophy Emeritus at the University of Arizona. He is known for his works on philosophy of science and is a winner of the Lakatos Award.

== Books ==
- The Quantum Revolution in Philosophy, Oxford University Press, 2017
- Gauging What's Real: The Conceptual Foundations of Gauge Theories, Oxford University Press, 2007
- The Philosophy of Quantum Mechanics, Cambridge University Press, 1989
