= Samir Okasha =

Professor of Philosophy of Science

Samir Okasha FBA
- سمیر عکاشه
- Education: University of Oxford
- Awards: Lakatos Award (2009), Henry Wilde Prize (1992)
- Scientific career
- Fields: History and philosophy of science
- Workplaces: University of Bristol; University of York; National Autonomous University of Mexico
- Doctoral advisor: Bill Newton-Smith
- Website: bristol.ac.uk/school-of-arts/people/samir-okasha

Samir Okasha FBA is a Professor of Philosophy of Science at University of Bristol. He is a winner of Lakatos Award for his book Evolution and the Levels of Selection. He was appointed a Fellow of the British Academy in 2018.

== Books ==
- Philosophy of Biology (OUP 2019)
- Agents and Goals in Evolution (OUP 2018)
- Evolution and the Levels of Selection (OUP 2006)
- Philosophy of Science: A Very Short Introduction (OUP 2002; second edition 2015)
