= Henk de Regt =

Professor of philosophy of science

Henk W. de Regt is a Dutch philosopher of science and Professor of Philosophy of Natural Sciences at the Institute for Science in Society of Radboud University in Nijmegen, the Netherlands, where he also serves as the institute's director. His research concerns scientific understanding, explanation and the public understanding of science. He is best known for the contextual theory of intelligibility developed in his book Understanding Scientific Understanding (Oxford University Press, 2017), for which he received the 2019 Lakatos Award.

== Career ==
Before moving to Radboud University in 2019, de Regt held a professorship in the philosophy of science at the Vrije Universiteit Amsterdam for eighteen years. In the same year he was elected a member of the International Academy of Philosophy of Science. His work bridges philosophy of science and the history of science, with case studies drawn from physics and chemistry.

== Research ==
De Regt is associated with the development of a contextual theory of scientific understanding. In a 2005 paper co-authored with the philosopher of physics Dennis Dieks, he proposed a general criterion of intelligibility for scientific theories that is essentially context-sensitive: whether a given theory satisfies the criterion depends on factors that can vary between scientific communities and historical periods.

In Understanding Scientific Understanding (2017) de Regt extends this account into a full philosophical theory. He argues that providing correct explanations is an epistemic aim of science, that giving such explanations requires theories that are intelligible to the scientists using them, and that the standards by which intelligibility is judged vary by context. On this view, scientific understanding is neither reducible to a single explanatory template (such as the deductive-nomological model or unificationist accounts) nor purely subjective; it is a relation between a theory, a community of scientists, and the cognitive and historical conditions in which they work.

== Awards ==
In 2019, de Regt was awarded the Lakatos Award for Understanding Scientific Understanding. The award is administered by the London School of Economics and given annually for an outstanding contribution to the philosophy of science published in English in the previous six years. The award selectors described the book as "a remarkable book ... a magnificent example of how history and philosophy of science can be productively integrated." He delivered the corresponding public lecture at LSE in November 2019.

In the same year he was elected to the International Academy of Philosophy of Science.

== Selected publications ==
- De Regt, Henk W. (2017). Understanding Scientific Understanding. Oxford Studies in Philosophy of Science. New York: Oxford University Press. ISBN 978-0190652913.
- De Regt, Henk W.; Leonelli, Sabina; Eigner, Kai, eds. (2009). Scientific Understanding: Philosophical Perspectives. University of Pittsburgh Press. ISBN 978-0822943969.
- De Regt, Henk W.; Dieks, Dennis (2005). "A Contextual Approach to Scientific Understanding". Synthese. 144 (1): 137–170. doi:10.1007/s11229-005-5000-4.
