= Stuart Firestein =

American biologist

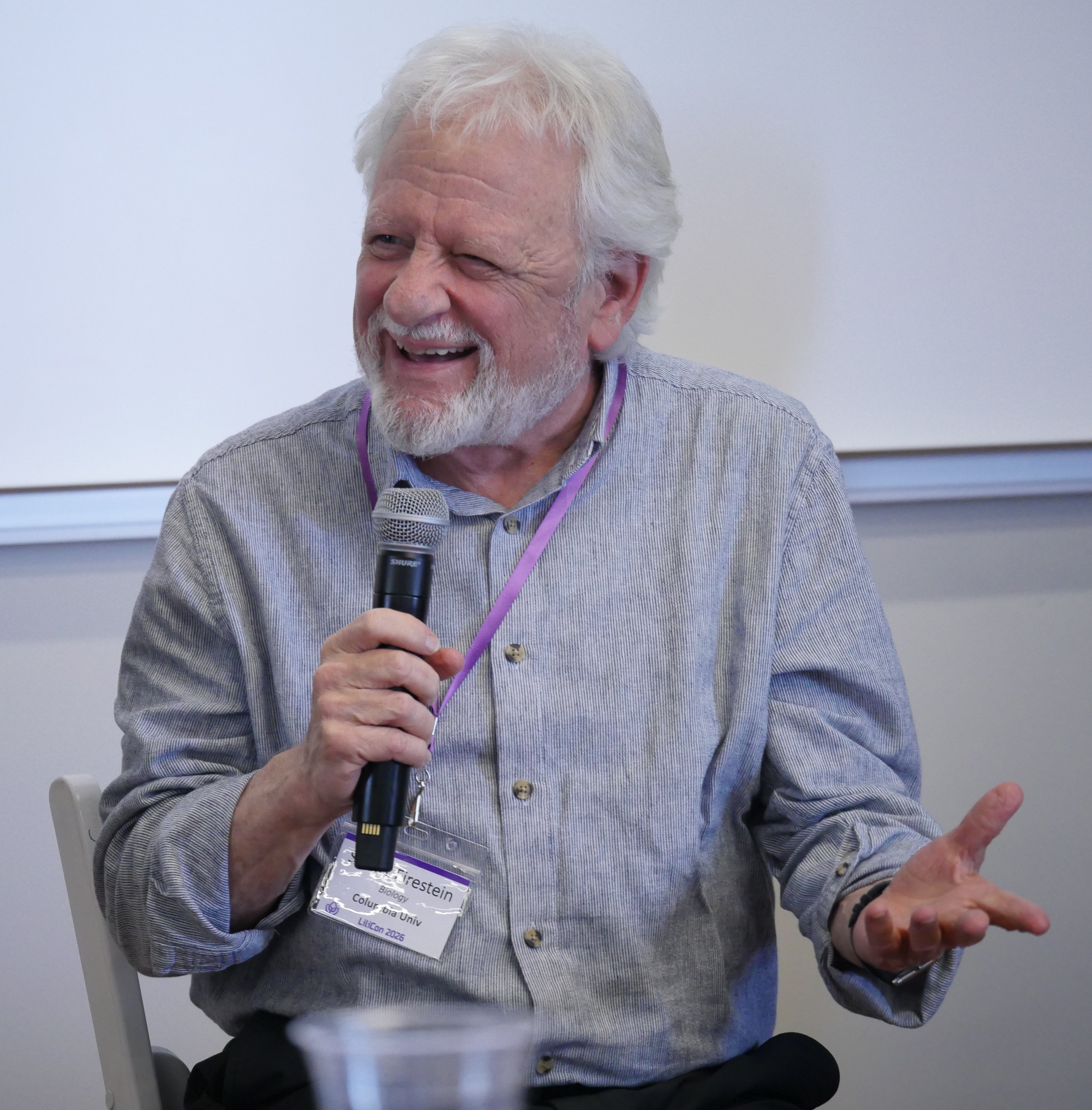
- Firestein at LiliCon 2026
- Education: San Francisco State University BS in Biology, UC Berkeley PhD
- Known for: Chairman of the Department of Biology at Columbia University, professor of neuroscience
- Spouse: Diana Reiss
- Scientific career
- Fields: Biology
- Workplaces: Columbia University
- Website: bioweb.biology.columbia.edu/firestein/

Signature
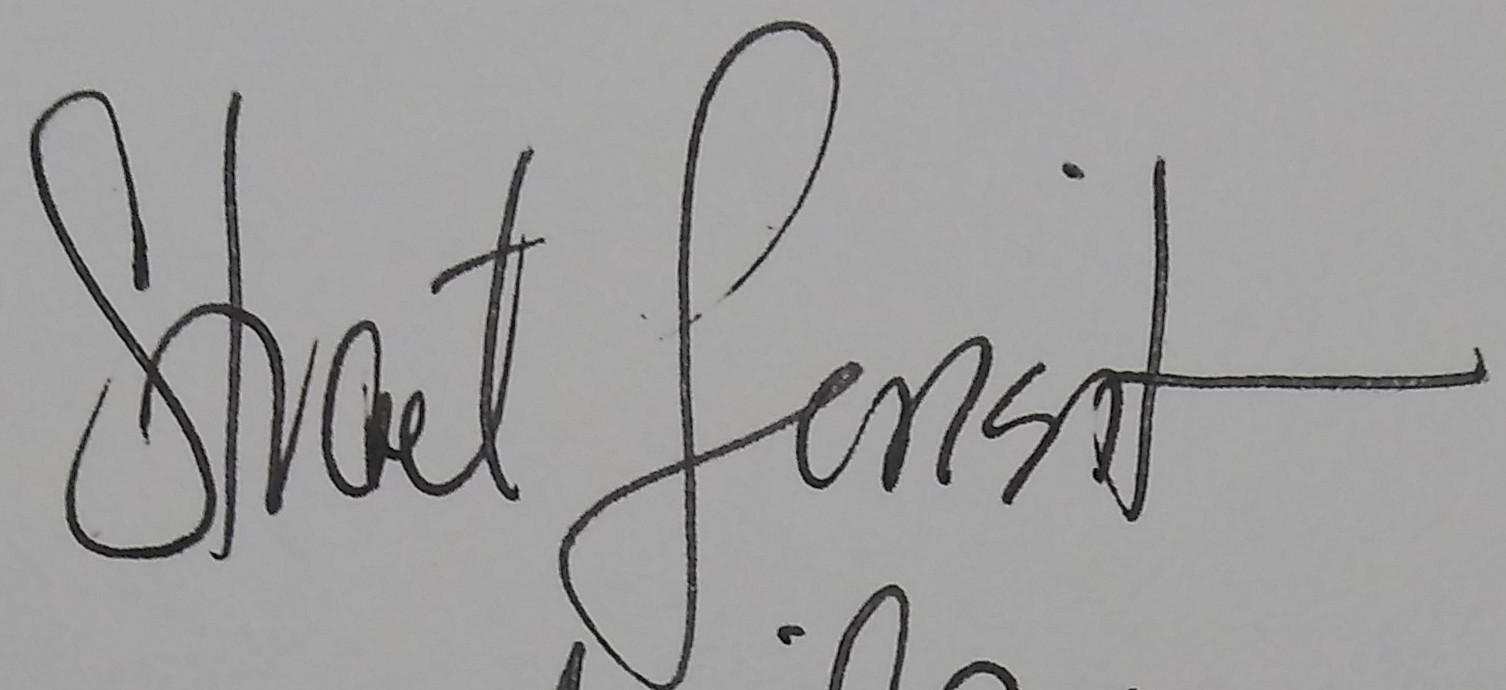

Stuart J. Firestein is the chair of the Department of Biological Sciences at Columbia University, where his laboratory is researching the vertebrate olfactory receptor neuron. He has published articles in Wired magazine, Huffington Post, and Scientific American. Firestein has been elected as a fellow by the American Association for the Advancement of Science (AAAS) for his meritorious efforts to advance science. He is an adviser to the Alfred P. Sloan Foundation program for the Public Understanding of Science. Firestein's writing often advocates for better science writing. In 2012 he released the book Ignorance: How it Drives Science, and in 2015, Failure: Why Science Is So Successful.

== Early life ==
Firestein was raised in Philadelphia. As a child, Firestein had many interests. In an interview with a reporter for Columbia College, he described his early history. "I started out with the usual childhood things — cowboy, fireman. My first interests were in science. I wanted to be an astronomer." Firestein attended an all-boys middle school, a possible reason he became interested in theater arts, because they were able to interact with an all-girls school. Firestein worked in theater for almost 20 years in San Francisco and Los Angeles and rep companies on the East Coast. At the age of 30, Firestein enrolled in San Francisco State as a full-time student. He has credited an animal communication class with Professor Hal Markowitz as "the most important thing that happened to me in life." Firestein received his graduate degree at age 40.

== Career ==
After earning his Ph.D. in neurobiology, Firestein was a researcher at Yale Medical School, then joined Columbia University in 1993.

At the Columbia University Department of Biological Sciences, Firestein is now studying the sense of smell. In his neuroscience lab, they investigate how the brain works, using the nose as a "model system" to understand the smaller piece of a difficult complex brain.

=== Ignorance: How It Drives Science ===
External videos
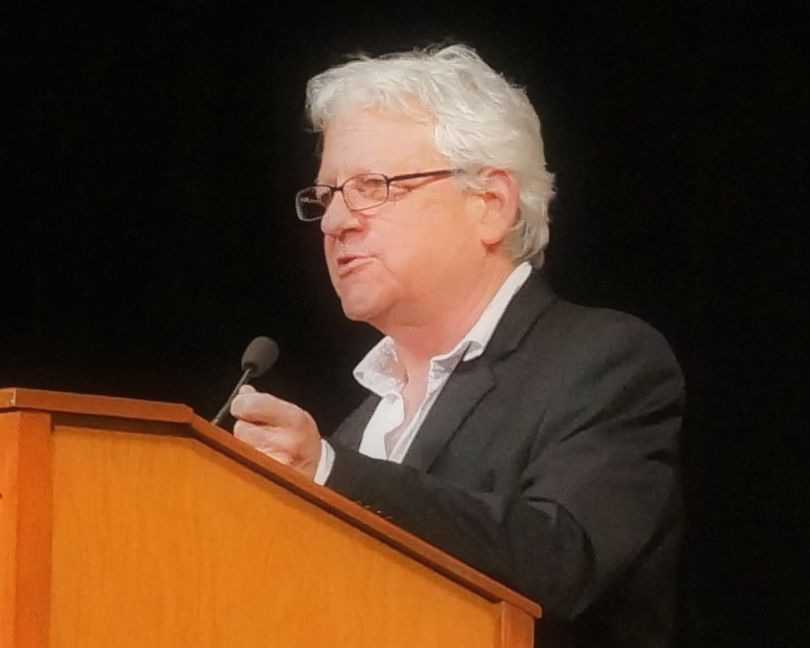
- Stuart Firestein: The pursuit of ignorance, (18:33), TED talks
- Ignorance: The Birthsplace of Bang: Stuart Firestein at TEDxBrussels, (16:29)

In his 2012 book Ignorance: How It Drives Science, Firestein argues that pursuing research based on what we don't know is more valuable than building on what we do know. When asked why he wrote the book, Firestein replied, "I came to the realization at some point several years ago that these kids [his students] must actually think we know all there is to know about neuroscience. And that's the difference. That's not what we think in the lab. What we think in the lab is, we don't know bupkis. So I thought, well, we should be talking about what we don't know, not what we know." The book was largely based on his class on ignorance, where each week he invited a professor from the hard sciences to lecture for two hours on what they do not know. No audio-visuals and no prepared lectures were allowed, the lectures became free-flowing conversations that students participated in.

Firestein explained to talk show host Diane Rehm that most people believe ignorance precedes knowledge, but in science, ignorance follows knowledge. Knowledge enables scientists to propose and pursue interesting questions about data that sometimes don't exist or fully make sense yet. "I use that term purposely to be a little provocative. But I don't mean stupidity. I don't mean dumb. I don't mean a callow indifference to facts or data or any of that," Firestein said. Instead, thoughtful ignorance looks at gaps in a community's understanding and seeks to resolve them.

=== Scientific method ===
The scientific method is a huge mistake, according to Firestein. He says that a hypothesis should be made after collecting data, not before. Firestein claims that scientists fall in love with their own ideas to the point that their own biases start dictating the way they look at the data. Oddly, he feels that facts are sometimes the most unreliable part of research. He feels that scientists don't know all the facts perfectly, and they "don't know them forever."

=== Searching for a black cat in a dark room ===
According to Firestein, scientific research is like trying to find a black cat in a dark room: It's very hard to find it, "especially when there's no black cat." His thesis is that the field of science has many black rooms where scientists freely move from one to another once the lights are turned on. Another analogy he uses is that scientific research is like a puzzle without a guaranteed solution.

== Personal life ==
Firestein is married to Diana Reiss, a cognitive psychologist at Hunter College and the City University of New York, where she studies animal behavior.

== Awards ==
- 2011 Lenfest Distinguished Columbia Faculty Award for excellence in scholarship and teaching
- 2011 Elected a fellow of the American Association for the Advancement of Science (AAAS). He was recognized for his "pioneering work" on the mammalian olfactory system.

== Bibliography ==
- Firestein, Stuart (2012). Ignorance: How it Drives Science. Oxford University Press. ISBN 978-0199828074.
- Firestein, Stuart (2015). Failure: Why Science Is So Successful. Oxford University Press. ISBN 9780199390106.
