= Hasok Chang =

American historian and philosopher (born 1967)

- 장하석
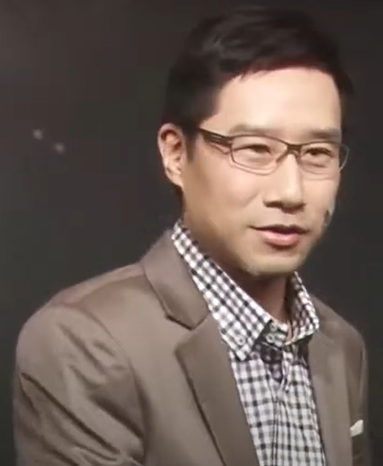
- Born: March 26, 1967 (age 59); Seoul, South Korea
- Citizenship: United States
- Education: Northfield Mount Hermon School; Hampshire College; California Institute of Technology (B.S.); Harvard University; Stanford University (Ph.D.)
- Known for: Active scientific realism
- Spouse: Gretchen Siglar
- Awards: BSHS Slade Prize (2005), Lakatos Award (2006), Fernando Gil International Prize for the Philosophy of Science (2013), Wilkins-Bernal-Medawar Lecture (2015)
- Scientific career
- Fields: History and philosophy of science
- Workplaces: Harvard University; University College London; University of Cambridge
- Academic advisors: Nancy Cartwright
- Website: www.people.hps.cam.ac.uk/index/teaching-officers/chang

- Korean name
- Hangul: 장하석
- Hanja: 張夏碩
- RR: Jang Haseok
- MR: Chang Hasŏk
- IPA: [tɕaŋɦasʌk]

Hasok Chang (Korean: 장하석; born March 26, 1967) is a South Korean-born American historian and philosopher of science currently serving as the Hans Rausing Professor at the Department of History and Philosophy of Science at the University of Cambridge and a board member of the Philosophy of Science Association. He previously served as president of the British Society for the History of Science from 2012 to 2014.

His areas of interest include the history and philosophy of chemistry and physics, the philosophy of scientific practice, measurement in quantum mechanics, realism, scientific evidence, pluralism and pragmatism.

== Early life and education ==
Chang was born in Seoul in 1967 to Korean civil servant (later politician) Che-Shik Chang and teacher Woo Sook Choi. Chang is the younger brother of economist Ha-Joon Chang and cousin of economist and Korea University professor Hasung Jang. He is married to psychotherapist Gretchen Siglar.

Chang studied at Northfield Mount Hermon School, Massachusetts, where he was valedictorian in 1985, and he was a visiting student at Hampshire College in Massachusetts. He graduated at the California Institute of Technology in 1989 with a B.S. Honors in an Independent Studies Program, concentrating on theoretical physics and philosophy. He went to Stanford University where he completed his Ph.D. in philosophy in 1993. His dissertation topic was entitled, Measurement and the Disunity of Quantum Physics. He was also a visiting graduate student at Harvard University.

== Career and awards ==
Chang was a research associate in physics at Harvard University from July 1993 to December 1994. In 1995 he moved to the United Kingdom where he worked as a lecturer at University College London's Department of Science and Technology Studies, becoming a professor in 2008. Chang moved to the University of Cambridge in 2010, becoming the Hans Rausing Professor of History and Philosophy of Science.

He worked as a consultant on BBC Four's series Shock and Awe: The Story of Electricity and Channel 4's Genius of Britain: The Scientists Who Changed the World. He appeared on EBS's series Chang Hasok's Science Meets Philosophy from February to May 2014, where he delivered lectures in Korean.

Chang is a founding member of the Committee for Integrated History and Philosophy of Science and the Society for Philosophy of Science in Practice, and he served as president of the British Society for the History of Science from 2012 to 2014 and vice-president from 2014 to 2015. He won the Lakatos Award in 2006 for his book Inventing Temperature: Measurement and Scientific Progress and in 2013 he won the Fernando Gil International Prize for the Philosophy of Science for his book Is Water H_{2}O?: Evidence, Realism and Pluralism. On May 10, 2016, he gave the Wilkins-Bernal-Medawar Lecture at the Royal Society.

He was awarded the Abraham Pais Prize for History of Physics in 2021 from the American Physical Society "For innovative and influential studies on the history and philosophy of the physical sciences, including scholarly works on scientific evidence, the physics-chemistry interaction, and historical and epistemic aspects of thermal physics."

== Bibliography ==
=== English ===
- Inventing Temperature: Measurement and Scientific Progress (2004)
- Is Water H_{2}O?: Evidence, Realism and Pluralism (2012)
- Realism for Realistic People: A New Pragmatist Philosophy of Science (2022)

=== Korean ===
- 장하석의 과학, 철학을 만나다 (Science Meets Philosophy) (2014)

== Media appearances ==
- Horizon, "What is One Degree?" (January 10, 2011) – Interviewed by Ben Miller
- Nova – Absolute Zero: The Conquest of Cold (January 8, 2008)
- Chang Hasok's Science Meets Philosophy (February–May 2014) – Aired on EBS

== See also ==
- Pictet's experiment, which Chang drew attention to in Inventing Temperature and a 2002 article.
