= Sneed =

- Gender: male

Origin
- Origin: snǣd
- Meaning: A detached piece of land or woodland
- Region of origin: Staffordshire, Worcestershire

Other names
- Related names: Sneyd, Snead, Sneath, Sneede, Snede

Sneed is a family surname of English origin. It derives from the Middle English word snede (Old English snǣd), meaning "a detached piece of land or woodland", and identified someone who lived in or came from such a location. It has its geographical origin in the English counties of Staffordshire and Worcestershire. Common variations include Sneyd, Snead, Sneath, Sneede and Snede.

== People ==
=== Surname ===
- Carly Sneed (married name Carly Fiorina, born 1954), American businesswoman and politician
- Chris Sneed, American politician
- Christine Sneed (born 1971), American author
- Cy Sneed (born 1992), American baseball player
- Ed Sneed (born 1944), American golfer
- Floyd Sneed (born 1942), Canadian drummer
- Jaylen Sneed (born 2004), American football player
- Joseph Sneed (disambiguation):
  - Joseph D. Sneed (born 1938), American physicist
  - Joseph P. Sneed (1804–1881), American Christian minister
  - Joseph Tyree Sneed III (1920–2008), American jurist
- John Sneed (1861–1898), American baseball player
- L'Jarius Sneed (born 1997), American football cornerback
- Lavinia B. Sneed (1867–1932), American journalist
- Louise Sneed Hill (1862–1955), American society leader in Denver, Colorado
- Meg Sneed (born 1982), American LGBT activist
- Omar Sneed (born 1976), American former professional basketball player
- Pamela Sneed, American artist
- R. R. Sneed (1875–1947), American politician
- Richard Sneed (born 1967), Native American, 28th Principal Chief of the Eastern Band of Cherokee Indians
- Richard A. Sneed (1845–1936), American Confederate veteran and politician
- Sam Sneed (born 1968), American rap musician
- Troy Sneed (1967–2020), American gospel musician
- William Sneed (disambiguation)
  - William Henry Sneed (1812–1869), American politician
  - William J. Sneed (1835–1907), American Confederate veteran, surgeon and educator
- Xavier Sneed (born 1997), American professional basketball player

=== Given name ===
- Sneed B. Collard III (born 1959), American author

== Fictional characters ==
- Shockwave (comics) (Lancaster Sneed), a Marvel Comics character
- Earl Sneed Sinclair, a fictional dinosaur on the TV show Dinosaurs
- Sneed, minor character from the 1999 The Simpsons episode "E-I-E-I-(Annoyed Grunt)"

== See also ==
- Snead
- Sneath
- Sneyd
