= Joseph Sneed =

Joseph Sneed may refer to:

- Joseph D. Sneed (1938-2020), American physicist
- Joseph P. Sneed (1804–1881), American Christian minister
- Joseph Tyree Sneed III (1920–2008), American jurist

== See also ==
- Joseph (disambiguation)
- Sneed (disambiguation)
