= Sneath =

Sneath is a surname.

== People ==
- Bob Sneath (born 1949), Australian politician
- H. Rochester Sneath (fl. 1948), British hoax letter writer
- Peter Sneath (1923–2011), British microbiologist
- Samuel B. Sneath (1828–1915), American banker, railroad owner, and manufacturer
- William Sneath (born 1977), English cricketer

== See also ==
- Snead
- Sneed
