= The Expedition School =

- Headquarters: Austin, Texas, USA
- Key people: Kimery Duda
- Website: www.expeditionschool.com

The Expedition School is an adventure company in Austin, Texas that offers excursions, adventure teambuilding, paddling programs, workshops, and first aid safety training.

== History ==
The Expedition School was founded in 2006 by Kimery Duda. She was inspired to offer environmentally-friendly experiences while professionally guiding around the world. The Expedition School was launched in Texas, but expanded to outdoor programs in Colorado and Costa Rica.

As of 2018, the Expedition School has trained 3,800 people in CPR and those trainees have saved a reported 92 lives. In total, 60,000 people have participated in programs run by the Expedition School.

== Services ==
The Expedition School offers customized adventure teambuilding, safety courses, school adventures tours, as well as lessons in stand up paddle boarding, kayaking, canoeing, surfing, hiking, climbing, teambuilding, and first aid. Their clients include children, adults, and corporate clients, and they partner with programs like the Texas Mountain Bike League and the Texas School for the Blind and Visually Impaired.

The Expedition School has also partnered with Keep Austin Beautiful’s Clean Lady Bird Lake program for the last seven years, helping to remove more than 8 tons of litter from the lake. The program garnered the 2017 Litter Abatement Award from Keep Austin Beautiful.
