= William Sneed =

William Sneed may refer to:

- William Henry Sneed (1812–1869), American attorney and politician in Murfreesboro and Knoxville, Tennessee
- William J. Sneed (1835–1907), American Confederate veteran, surgeon, and educator in Nashville, Tennessee
