= Sneed (disambiguation) =

Sneed is an English surname.

Sneed might also refer to:

== Places ==
=== Towns and settlements ===
- Sneed, Arkansas, a ghost town in Arkansas, USA
- Sneedville, Tennessee, a town in Tennessee, USA
- Sneedsboro, North Carolina, a ghost town in North Carolina, USA

=== Houses ===
- Constantine Sneed House, a house in Brentwood, Tennessee, USA
- Judge Sebron G. Sneed House, a house in Fayetteville, Arkansas, USA

== Other ==
- Sneed's pincushion cactus, the common name for the cactus Escobaria sneedii
- Trying to Save Piggy Sneed, a 1996 short story collection by John Irving
- Sneed, internet meme and slang based in the 1999 The Simpsons episode "E-I-E-I-(Annoyed Grunt)"
- Boyce–Sneed feud, a conflict in early 20th-century Texas between two wealthy cattlemen, Albert Boyce Jr and John Beal Sneed.

== See also ==
- Snead (disambiguation)
- Sneyd (disambiguation)
