= Sneyd (disambiguation) =

Sneyd is a surname.

Sneyd may also refer to:

== Places ==
- Sneyd Green, an area in the city of Stoke-on-Trent, Staffordshire, England
- Sneyd Park, a suburb of Bristol, England, developed and named in Victorian times
- Sneyd Comprehensive School, a school in Bloxwich, Walsall, West Midlands, England, closed in 2011
- Sneyd High School, now Newcastle Academy, Newcastle-under-Lyme, Staffordshire, England

== Other uses ==
- Sneyd Davies (1709–1769), English poet, academic and churchman
- Sneyd Colliery Disaster, coal mine disaster in Burslem, Staffordshire, England

== See also ==
- Sneed (disambiguation)
- Snead (disambiguation)
