= Texas School for the Blind and Visually Impaired =

Texas special public school

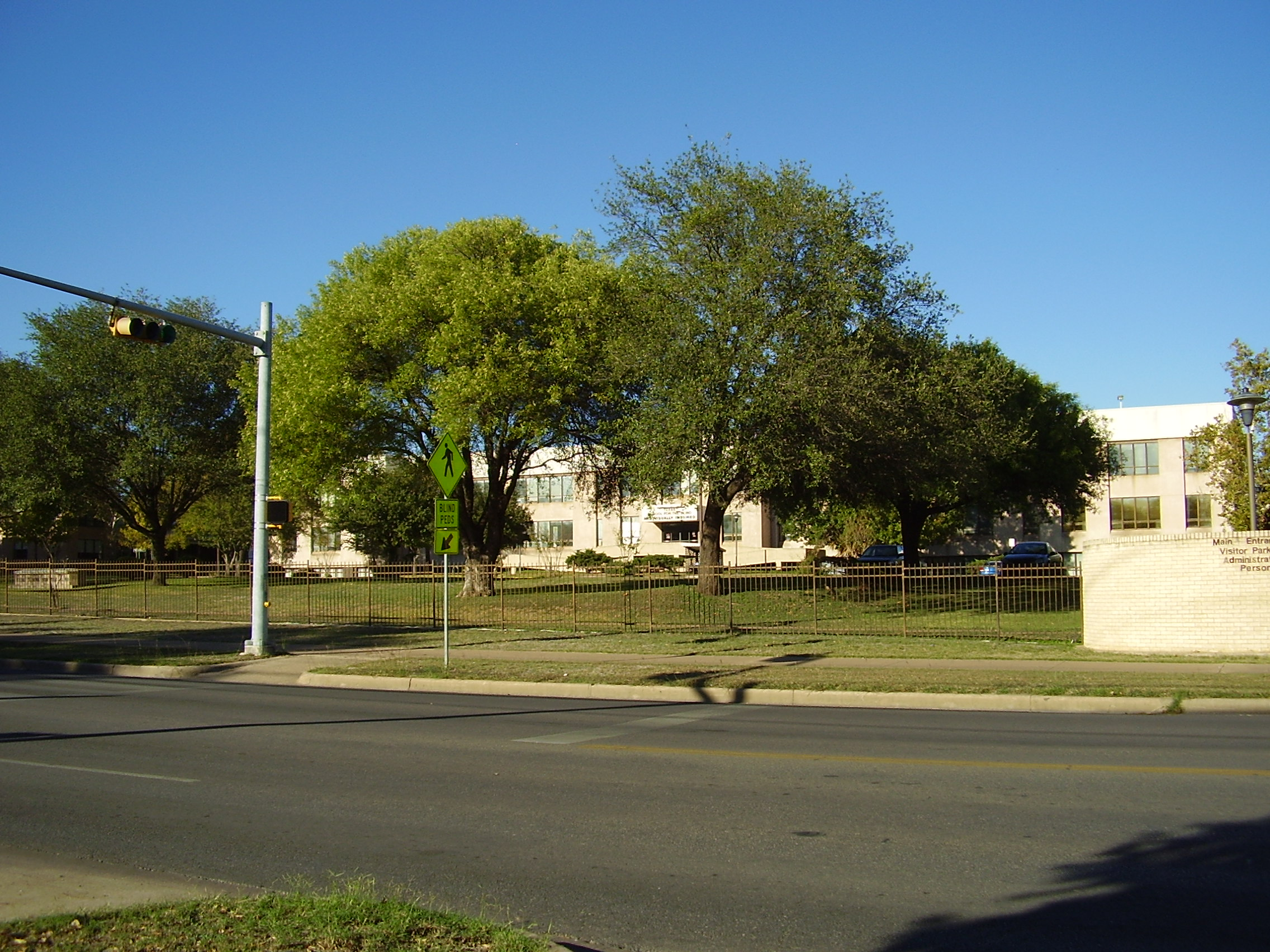
Texas School for the Blind and Visually Impaired

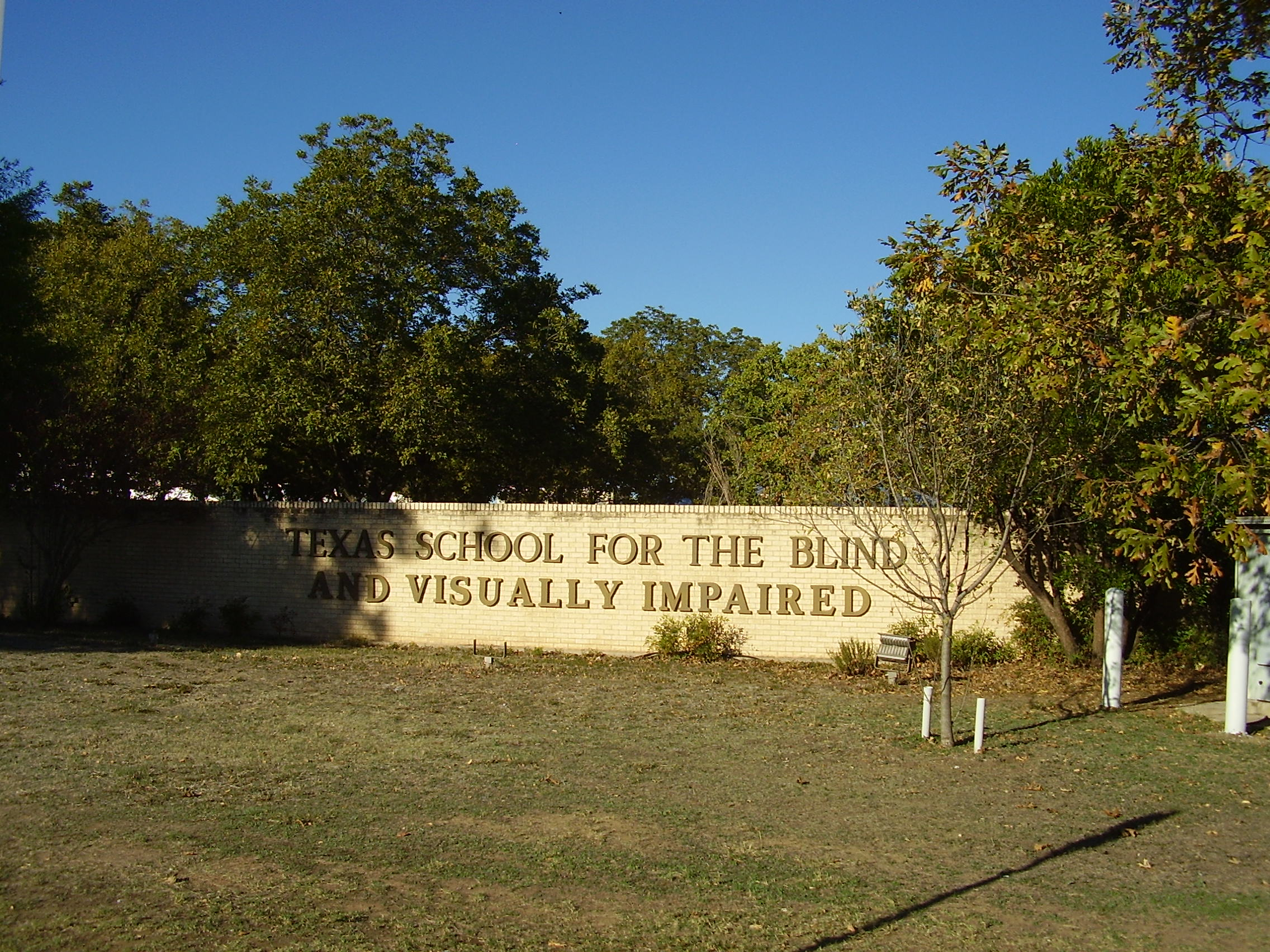
Texas School for the Blind and Visually Impaired

The Texas School for the Blind and Visually Impaired (TSBVI) is a Texas special public school, in the continuum of statewide placements for students who have a visual impairment. It is considered a statewide resource to parents of these children and professionals who serve them. Students, ages 6 through 21, who are blind, deaf-blind, or visually impaired, including those with additional disabilities, are eligible for consideration for services at TSBVI.

Founded in 1856, the school is currently located at 1100 West 45th Street in Austin and serves not only the local community but also most of the blind children in other schools across the state. The school has special equipment and classroom routines tailored to blind students, and according to a 2008 Texas Monthly article, blind students who previously attended ordinary public schools had a positive reception to TSBVI after enrolling there. It is the subject of a documentary, The Eyes of Me.

== History ==
On August 16, 1856, the Texas Legislature enacted a measure providing for the establishment of a Texas Asylum for the Blind in Austin. The state leased the Neill–Cochran House as a temporary site for the asylum while a permanent campus was constructed. The asylum facility was designed and built by Abner H. Cook, a local architect who had recently designed both the Neill–Cochran House and the Texas Governor's Mansion. In 1857 the asylum moved into its new campus (now the University of Texas at Austin's Little Campus), where it operated until the end of the American Civil War in 1865.

After having its facility commandeered by Reconstruction forces for a year, the asylum was reopened in 1866 and occupied its original campus from then until 1915, while the program was renamed the Texas Blind Institute in 1905 and then the Texas School for the Blind in 1915. During World War I the School for the Blind was displaced by a military pilot training program, and it relocated to its current campus in 1917.

The state transferred control of the school to the Texas Education Agency in 1953, from which point the School for the Blind became a self-contained school district. In the late 1960s the school was integrated with the all-black Texas Blind and Deaf School. In 1989 the program was renamed the Texas School for the Blind and Visually Impaired.

== Student body ==
As of 2008 50% of the school's students are of high school age. TSBVI may take up to 150 boarding students. Usually, blind students in Texas attend school in their local school districts, which are obligated to educate them under the law. Students who attend TSBVI do so only after their parents and their schools and school districts all agree that TSBVI is best-equipped for their education.

== See also ==
- Blindness and education
- Texas School for the Deaf
