= Neill–Cochran House =

Historic house in Texas, United States

- Neill–Cochran House Museum
- U.S. National Register of Historic Places
- Recorded Texas Historic Landmark
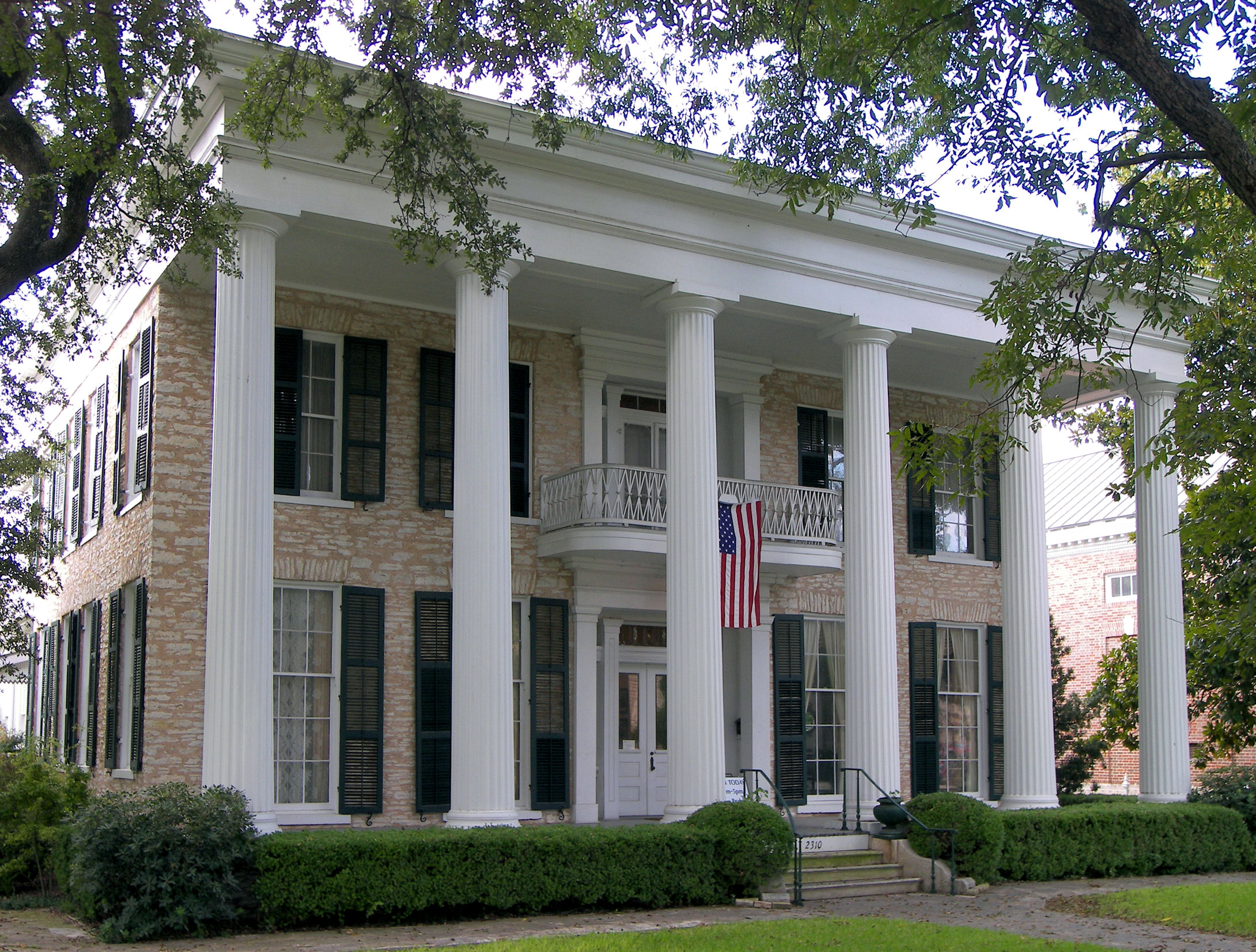
- The Neill–Cochran House Museum in 2007

- Location within Texas Location within the United States
- Interactive map showing the location of Neill-Cochran House
- Location: 2310 San Gabriel; Austin, Texas, USA
- Coordinates: 30°17′14″N 97°44′53″W
- Built: 1855
- Architect: Abner Cook
- Architectural style: Greek Revival
- NRHP reference No.: 70000768
- RTHL No.: 15134

Significant dates
- Added to NRHP: August 25, 1970
- Designated RTHL: 1966

The Neill–Cochran House Museum is a historic home in north-central Austin, Texas. Abner Cook designed and built the house in 1855 as a suburban estate many years before the surrounding area was settled by other homes and businesses. The two-story Greek Revival home features prominent Doric columns and Cook's signature "sheaf of wheat" balusters.

== History ==
The house was built on 17.5 acres (71,000 m^{2}) northwest of town for Washington and Mary Hill, although they never occupied it. In 1856, it was leased to the Texas Institute for the Blind, currently known as the Texas School for the Blind and Visually Impaired, to serve as its first home until Abner Cook finished the school's campus across town.

Subsequently, the House was leased by Lt. Governor Fletcher Stockdale and, it is believed, former Provisional Governor Andrew J. Hamilton. At the end of the Civil War, Federal troops converted the House into a hospital. General George Armstrong Custer was stationed in Austin during Reconstruction, occupying the blind school and, no doubt, visit the Neill–Cochran House. A two-story building behind the main house is believed to be Austin's last remaining recognizable slave quarters.

In 1876, the home was sold to Colonel Andrew Neill, a Confederate veteran. Neill lived there with his wife Jennie Chapman Neill, who stayed on after Neill's death and in 1893 rented the home to Judge Thomas Beauford Cochran.

Cochran purchased the home outright in 1895 for his family and expanded and modernized the home. In 1958, the Cochran family sold the property to The National Society of the Colonial Dames of America in The State of Texas. The NSCDA operates the home today as a historic house museum. The Neill–Cochran House Museum is listed on the National Register of Historic Places and is a Texas Historical Commission landmark.

In 2007, White Rabbit Adventure Games published a walk-through computer adventure game based on the Neill–Cochran House. The game, "Sterling's Gift", features a fictional story based on published memoirs and diaries that helps the player solve a 150-year-old mystery involving George Custer's wife Libbie. Royalties from the sale of this unique game go to the Neill–Cochran House Museum.

== Gallery ==
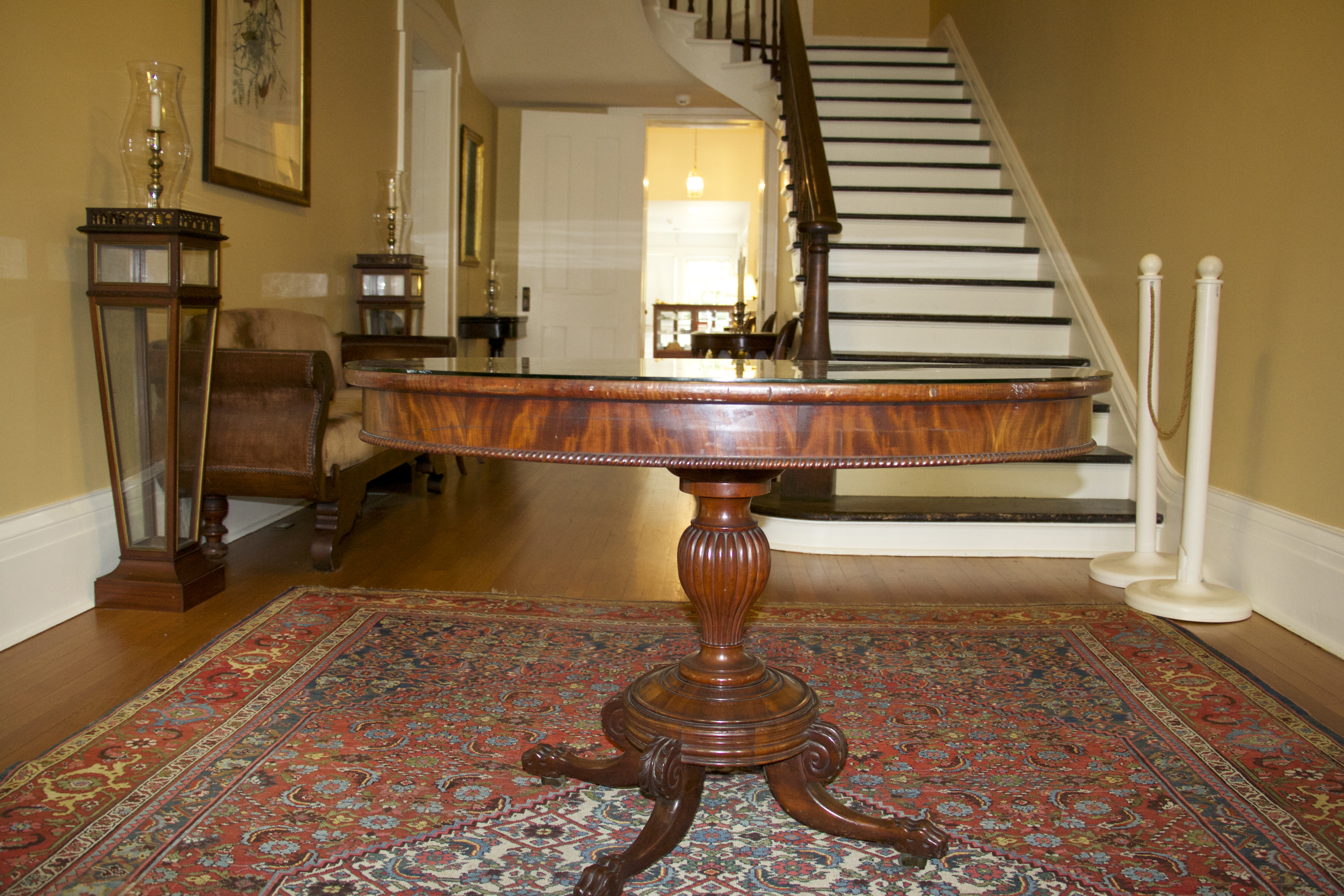
Neill–Cochran House Museum atrium

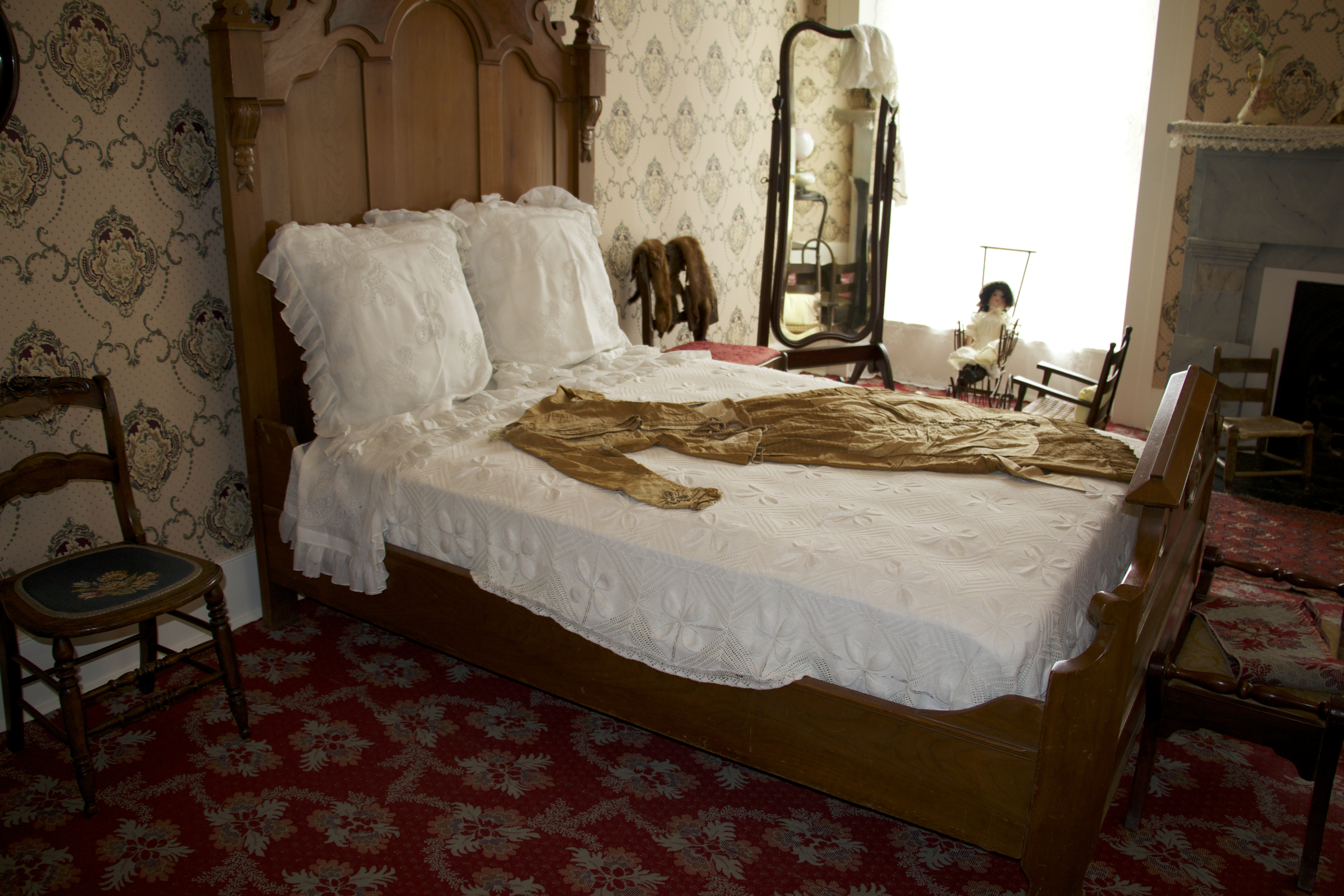
Neill–Cochran House Museum bedroom
