= Port Sullivan, Texas =

Port Sullivan
- Ghost town
- Location within Texas Location within the United States
- Coordinates: 30°51′58″N 96°41′44″W
- Country: United States
- State: Texas
- County: Milam
- Established: 1835

Port Sullivan, Texas is a ghost town in Milam County, Texas. It was established in 1835 by Augustus W. Sullivan. By the 1850s, Joseph P. Sneed, a pastor of the Methodist Episcopal Church, South, founded the Port Sullivan Male and Female Institute (also known as the Port Sullivan College). The town is home to the Port Sullivan Cemetery.
