= A. J. Jernigan House =

Historic house in Texas, United States

- U.S. National Register of Historic Places
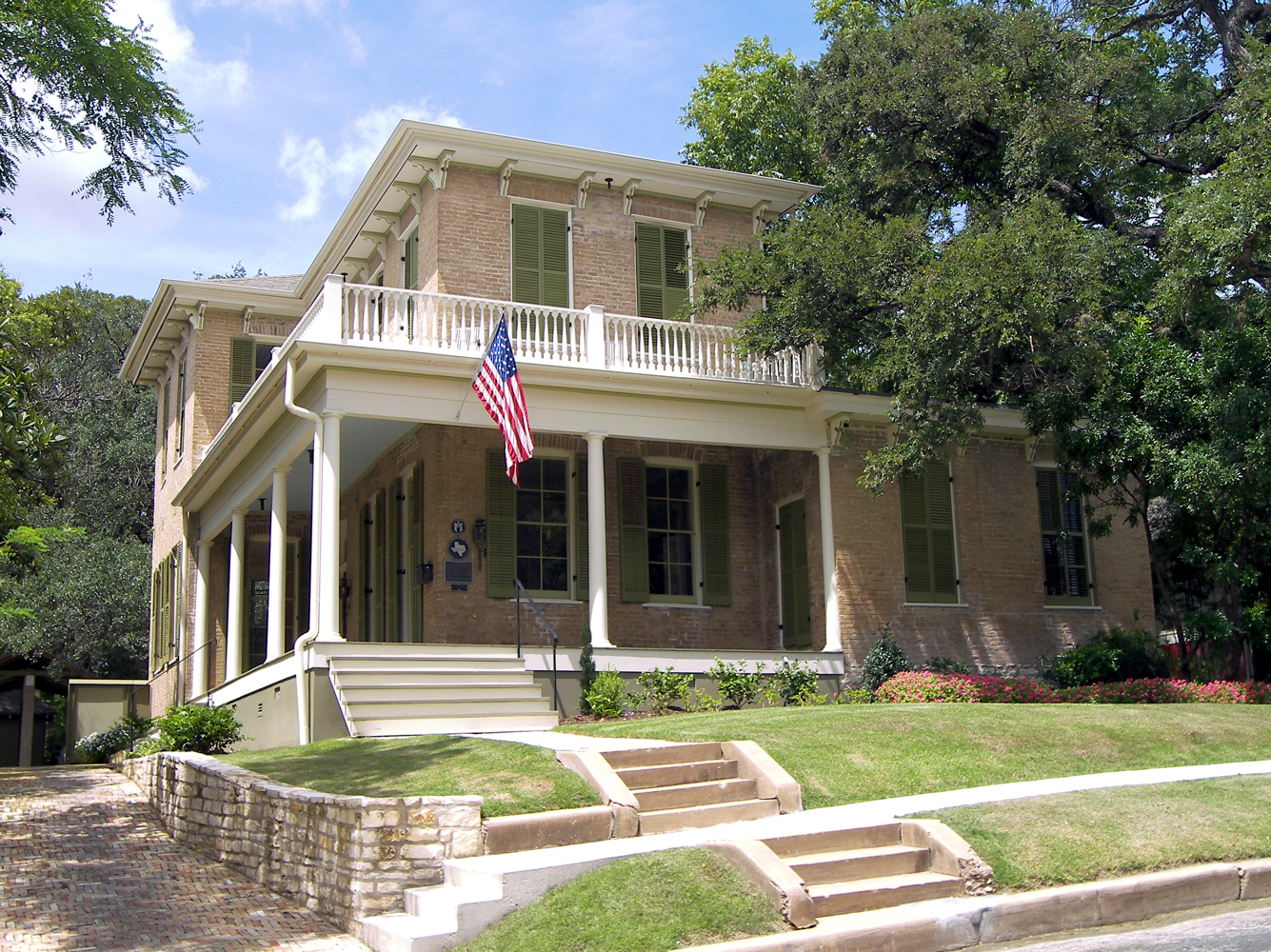
- Las Ventanas in 2007

- Location within Texas Location within the United States
- Location: 602 Harthan Street; Austin, Texas, USA
- Coordinates: 30°16′25″N 97°45′28″W
- Built: 1875
- NRHP reference No.: 83003166
- Added to NRHP: September 22, 1983

The A. J. Jernigan House, known as Las Ventanas, is a historic home in west-central Austin, Texas, United States. The home was designed and built in 1875 for Mr. Jernigan, then the Travis County treasurer, by noted master builder Abner Cook.

The home was expanded in the late 1880s and 1912. In the late 20th century it served as commercial office space, before being renovated near the start of the 21st century for use as a single-family home again.

The home is located at 602 Harthan Street. It was added to the National Register of Historic Places in 1983.
