= Frederick George Hamley =

American judge (1903–1975)

Senior Judge of the United States Court of Appeals for the Ninth Circuit
- In office July 6, 1971 – May 5, 1975

Judge of the United States Court of Appeals for the Ninth Circuit
- In office July 2, 1956 – July 6, 1971
- Appointed by: Dwight D. Eisenhower
- Preceded by: Homer Bone
- Succeeded by: Joseph Tyree Sneed III

Member of the Seattle City Council
- In office March 1935 – March 1938

Personal details
- Born: Frederick George Hamley; October 24, 1903 Seattle, Washington, U.S.
- Died: May 5, 1975 (aged 71)
- Education: University of Washington (BA); University of Washington School of Law (LLB)

Frederick George Hamley (October 24, 1903 – May 5, 1975) was a United States circuit judge of the United States Court of Appeals for the Ninth Circuit.

== Education and career ==
Born in Seattle, Washington, Hamley received a Bachelor of Arts degree from the University of Washington, and a Bachelor of Laws from the University of Washington School of Law in 1932. He was in private practice in Seattle from 1932 to 1938, and was active in civic politics. He was elected to Seattle City Council in 1935 and served for one term until 1938. In June 1938, he became the Superintendent of the Seattle Water Department, serving for only a few months before becoming an assistant district counsel for the United States Bureau of Reclamation for the Grand Coulee Dam from 1938 to 1940. He was a special assistant state attorney general and legal advisor to the governor of Washington from 1940 to 1941. He was director of the Department of Public Service for the State of Washington from 1941 to 1943. He was an assistant general solicitor for the National Association of Railroad and Utilities Commissioners from 1943 to 1945, and was then the general solicitor o that organization from 1945 to 1949. He was appointed as a justice of the Washington Supreme Court in 1949, to a seat vacated by the retirement of Clyde G. Jeffers, and served until 1956, serving as chief justice from 1955 to 1956.

== Federal judicial service ==
On May 22, 1956, Hamley was nominated by President Dwight D. Eisenhower to a seat on the United States Court of Appeals for the Ninth Circuit vacated by Judge Homer Bone. Hamley was confirmed by the United States Senate on June 29, 1956, and received his commission on July 2, 1956. He assumed senior status on July 6, 1971, serving in that capacity until his death on May 5, 1975.

== Sources ==
- Frederick G. Hamley Papers. 1933-1963. 6.83 cubic feet. At the Labor Archives of Washington, University of Washington

Legal offices
Preceded by Homer Bone	Judge of the United States Court of Appeals for the Ninth Circuit; 1956–1971	Succeeded by Joseph Tyree Sneed III
