= Wolfgang Stegmüller =

Austrian philosopher

- Born: 3 June 1923; Natters, Austria
- Died: 11 June 1991 (aged 68); Munich, Germany

Education
- Education: University of Innsbruck
- Theses: Erkenntnis und Sein in der modernen Ontologie mit besonderer Berücksichtigung der Erkenntnismetaphysik Nicolai Hartmanns: eine kritische Untersuchung (1947); Sein, Wahrheit und Wert in der heutigen Philosophie (1949)
- Doctoral advisor: Theodor Paul Erismann; Richard Strohal

Philosophical work
- Era: 20th-century philosophy
- Region: Western philosophy
- School: Analytic philosophy Scientific structuralism
- Institutions: University of Innsbruck
- Main interests: Philosophy of science
- Notable ideas: Dynamics of theories

Wolfgang Stegmüller (Austrian German: [ˈʃteːgˌmʏlɐ]; June 3, 1923 – June 11, 1991) was an Austrian philosopher who made important contributions in philosophy of science and analytic philosophy.

== Biography ==
Stegmüller studied economics and philosophy at the University of Innsbruck. In 1944, he graduated as "Diplom-Volkswirt" and one year later he obtained a PhD in economics. Also at the University of Innsbruck he obtained in 1947 a PhD in philosophy with the thesis Erkenntnis und Sein in der modernen Ontologie mit besonderer Berücksichtigung der Erkenntnismetaphysik Nicolai Hartmanns: eine kritische Untersuchung. In 1949, he habilitated with the thesis Sein, Wahrheit und Wert in der heutigen Philosophie.

After a stay of one year at the University of Oxford in 1954 he returned to the University of Innsbruck where he was appointed as associate professor for philosophy in 1956. After staying as a visiting professor at the Universities of Kiel and Bonn he received a call from the Ludwig-Maximilians-Universität München (LMU). In 1958, he was appointed professor for philosophy, logic, and philosophy of sciences there and became director of the "Seminar II". Except for two stays as a visiting professor in 1962/63 and 1964 at the University of Pennsylvania, he remained in Munich and ran there a center for analytical philosophy until his retirement in 1990. From 1977 to 1979 he also was dean of the faculty for philosophy, philosophy of science, and statistics.

Stegmüller was from 1966 onwards a corresponding member of the Austrian Academy of Sciences and from 1967 on a member of the Bavarian Academy of Sciences and Humanities. 1972 he became a member of the French Institut International de Philosophie, located in Paris. He also was a member of the International Academy of Science, Munich founded in 1980. In 1989 W. Stegmüller was awarded an honorary doctorate from the University of Innsbruck. After his retirement he was elected as honorary president of the Gesellschaft für Analytische Philosophie (Society for Analytical Philosophy).

== Work ==
Stegmüller can be credited with essential contributions to the dissemination of ideas of analytical philosophy and philosophy of science in the German-speaking world. In his inaugural lecture at the University of Innsbruck, he outlined the four problems in epistemology, which he focussed on in his later work:

- The problem of induction
- The fundamental role of experience
- The problem of theoretical concepts
- The problem of scientific explanation

=== Logic ===
In his books Das Wahrheitsproblem und die Idee der Semantik (The Problem of Truth and the Idea of Semantics, 1957), and Unvollständigkeit und Unentscheidbarkeit (Incompleteness and Undecidability, 1959) Stegmüller disseminated the ideas of Alfred Tarski and Rudolf Carnap on semantics and logics as well as those of Kurt Gödel on mathematical logic. Later similar works are on Die Antinomien und ihre Behandlung (Antinomies and Their Treatment, 1955) as well as Strukturtypen der Logik (Types of Structures of Logic, 1961).

=== Epistemology ===
One of the most influential books of Stegmüller is Metaphysik, Skepsis, Wissenschaft (1954). In this work, he discusses the epistemological foundations of metaphysics, scepticism, and science. He demonstrates that any search for epistemological fundamentals will necessarily lead to the problem of the evidence—which Stegmüller does not regard as solvable. He also refuses the potential solution that universal skepticism is self-refuting. Even if it were self-refuting, universal skepticism can be stated if the skeptic does not try to justify it. In consequence, explicit conditions (Evidenzvoraussetzungen) are necessary in metaphysics as well as in science. This means that neither can be fundamentally justified but do presuppose a decision.

A further focus of Stegmüller's work was phenomenalism. In "Der Phänomenalismus und seine Schwierigkeiten" (1958), he describes the extreme problems, which hinder a stringent implementation of the phenomenalism program.

=== Philosophy of science ===
Stegmüller is regarded as one of the leading philosophers of science of the second half of the 20th century. Deeply influenced by Thomas S. Kuhn and Joseph D. Sneed, he and several co-workers expanded upon the ideas of Sneed in order to overcome the prevalent rationality crisis of science that was often regarded as a consequence of Kuhn's works. Furthermore, this led him to a new answer to the problems of theoretical concepts. This line of investigations is today known as the "structural theory of the empirical sciences".

== Selected publications ==
- Das Wahrheitsproblem und die Idee der Semantik, 1957
- Unvollständigkeit und Unentscheidbarkeit, 1959
- Einheit und Problematik der wissenschaftlichen Welterkenntnis, 1967
- Metaphysik – Skepsis – Wissenschaft, 1969
- Probleme und Resultate der Wissenschafttheorie und Analytischen Philosophie
  - Band I, Erklärung – Begründung – Kausalität, 1983
  - Band II, Theorie und Erfahrung, 1974
    - 1. Teilband: Theorie und Erfahrung, 1974
    - 2. Teilband: Theorienstrukturen und Theoriendynamik, 1985
    - 3. Teilband: Die Entwicklung des neuen Strukturalismus seit 1973, 1986
  - Band III, Strukturtypen der Logik, 1984
  - Band IV, Personelle und statistische Wahrscheinlichkeit, 1973
    - 1. Halbband: Personelle Wahrscheinlichkeit und rationale Entscheidung, 1973
    - 2. Halbband: Statistisches Schließen – Statistische Begründung – Statistische Analyse, 1973
- Das Problem der Induktion: Humes Herausforderung und moderne Antworten, 1975
- Rationale Rekonstruktion von Wissenschaft und ihrem Wandel, 1979
- The Structuralists View of Theories, 1979
- Aufsätze zur Wissenschaftstheorie, 1980
- Philosophy of economics, 1982
- Kripkes Deutung der Spätphilosophie Wittgensteins. Kommentarversuch über einen versuchten Kommentar. 1986
- Hauptströmungen der Gegenwartsphilosophie, Bd. I–IV, Kröner, 7. Auflage (1989), ISBN 3-520-30807-X
