= Abner Cook =

American architect

Abner Hugh Cook
- Born: March 15, 1814; Salisbury, North Carolina, US
- Died: February 22, 1884 (aged 69); Austin, Texas, US
- Occupation: Architect
- Notable work: Texas Governor's Mansion; Woodlawn; Neill-Cochran House
- Spouse: Eliza T. Logan

Abner Hugh Cook (March 15, 1814 – February 22, 1884) was a self-taught Texas architect and general contractor responsible for the design of several historic and notable buildings in Texas, particularly Austin, such as the Texas Governor's Mansion. He also designed the west wing of the original main building of the University of Texas at Austin (since demolished) and the first state penitentiary in Huntsville.

== Early life ==
Abner Hugh Cook was born to William Cook and Susanna Hill Cook in Rowan County, North Carolina, in 1814. In 1820, Cook had a brother and two sisters, and two young enslaved persons were listed with the household. He apprenticed to a master builder in the area and remained there until 1835.

At age 21, Cook moved to Macon, Georgia, and found work in construction. When the Panic of 1837 brought building to a halt, Cook moved to Nashville, Tennessee, but there was little work to be found in Nashville, and he moved to Texas in 1839.

== Career ==
After the end of his apprenticeship in 1835, Cook moved to the young town of Macon. In 1835, the town was prosperous and growing, providing opportunities for journeymen carpenters. Cook worked there until the Panic of 1837 bankrupted the largest local company, the Monroe Railroad and Banking Company, arresting local construction work and putting Cook out of work. Cook moved to Nashville in 1837, which exposed him to a variety of Greek Revival architecture. Yet employment for carpenters was also scarce in Nashville.

in 1839, when Cook arrived in the Republic of Texas at the port of Velasco, the government was planning to move to the new capital city of Austin. Cook, still a journeyman carpenter, met Heman Ward, a carpenter from New York. They formed the partnership of Ward, Cook and Company, with plans to solicit construction work in Austin.

Cook settled in Austin and supported himself with private commissions as a builder-architect for houses and furniture. Cook helped form the first Presbyterian church in Austin and is credited with constructing the main building of its first sanctuary. During this time there was little building construction in Austin, so he entered the finished lumber business in 1840 with Jacob Higgins and established a partnership based in Bastrop. The Higgins Mill was located in the Lost Pines, which was the few rich sources of trees within the region.

As the United States admitted Texas as a state in 1845, there was still doubt whether Austin would remain the capitol. Thomas W. Ward was an advocate for Austin, and planned a home for his family there. He purchased three town lots at the corner of Hickory and Lavaca. Ward, who like Cook, was trained and experienced as a builder-architect, had lost one arm and one leg in separate artillery tragedies and was no longer able to fully implement construction plans. When Ward was ready to build in 1846, he shared his plan with Cook, who constructed a house with a central plan with similarities in design with the French Legation in Austin. Cook completed the house for Ward in 1847.

In 1847, Cook accepted his first leadership role in government. He was appointed to a planning committee for a new jail for Travis County. By 1848, Texas its plan for a state prison while hiring Cook as superintendent of construction for the new facility in Huntsville. At that time a journeyman carpenter in Austin could expect to earn about $500 per year, while the superintendent job paid Cook twice that in annual salary. Cook consulted on the drafting of plans for the prison, as well as input on important hirings. He supervised the construction of the framing and masonry work on the building until his resignation in March 1850.

Cook returned to his work as a builder-architect in Austin after his return from Huntsville. His first commission was a new chapel for the re-organized Presbyterian church. Built facing the old structure, he erected the new building on the northeast corner of Lavaca and Bois d'Arc streets, where the first service convened on August 24, 1851. The chapel was austere and functional.

Cook revisited the materials business in 1851. He formed a partnership with Lamar Moore to manufacture brick, which earned a reputation for quality and supplied the claddings for many buildings in Austin in the early 1850s. After Moore's death, Cook acquired his partner's share of the business. He operated kilns and a brickyard as an individual proprietor from February 1853 through July 1858, when he sold the company to James H. Raymond. Meanwhile, in 1853, Cook returned to the finished lumber business when he acquired a one-third interest in a sawmill from Hiram Chapin and Kener Keener in Bastrop County. While Cook had sold his brick to other builders, he also constructed the brick-clad Methodist Church in Austin at the corner of Mulberry and Brazos streets. By engaging in the brick and finished lumber businesses, he secured access to high-quality construction supplies for his own building contracts.

== Notable works ==
In 1847, Cook built a large residence for a wealthy Austin patron. Between summer 1848 until early 1850 he was at Huntsville, supervising the construction of the Texas State Penitentiary and served as its first superintendent. Cook then designed and built three large Greek Revival homes in Austin which still stand: Woodlawn (1853), the Texas Governor's Mansion (1855), and the Neill-Cochran House (1855).

== Personal life ==
On September 15, 1842, Cook married Eliza Taylor Logan. She was a widow with three children. The Cooks had four of their own sons: Abner Hugh, Jr., William Franklin, Charles B., and Edgar T. In addition to acquiring Eliza's house and furnishing, Eliza brought three enslaved persons into the marriage, Hannah, Rebecca, and Prince. By 1850, Cook owned as many as ten enslaved persons.

Cook was among those attending organizational meetings for a Presbyterian church in Austin in 1839. He also was a member of the local temperance society. Cook was also a member of the newly formed Presbyterian church in Huntsville and the local chapter of the Sons of Temperance. The Presbyterian church in Austin had lost its status as a Presbytery in 1846, but Cook was among the leaders of the congregation to reorganize the church in 1851 and the Cooks boarded the newly arrived Reverend Daniel Baker and his wife. Cook was elected as a church elder.

== Death ==
Cook died in Austin in 1884, aged 69. The immediate cause of death was blood poisoning, brought on by acute kidney disease. His funeral was held in Austin at the Southern Presbyterian Church and he was buried at Oakwood Cemetery.

== Gallery ==
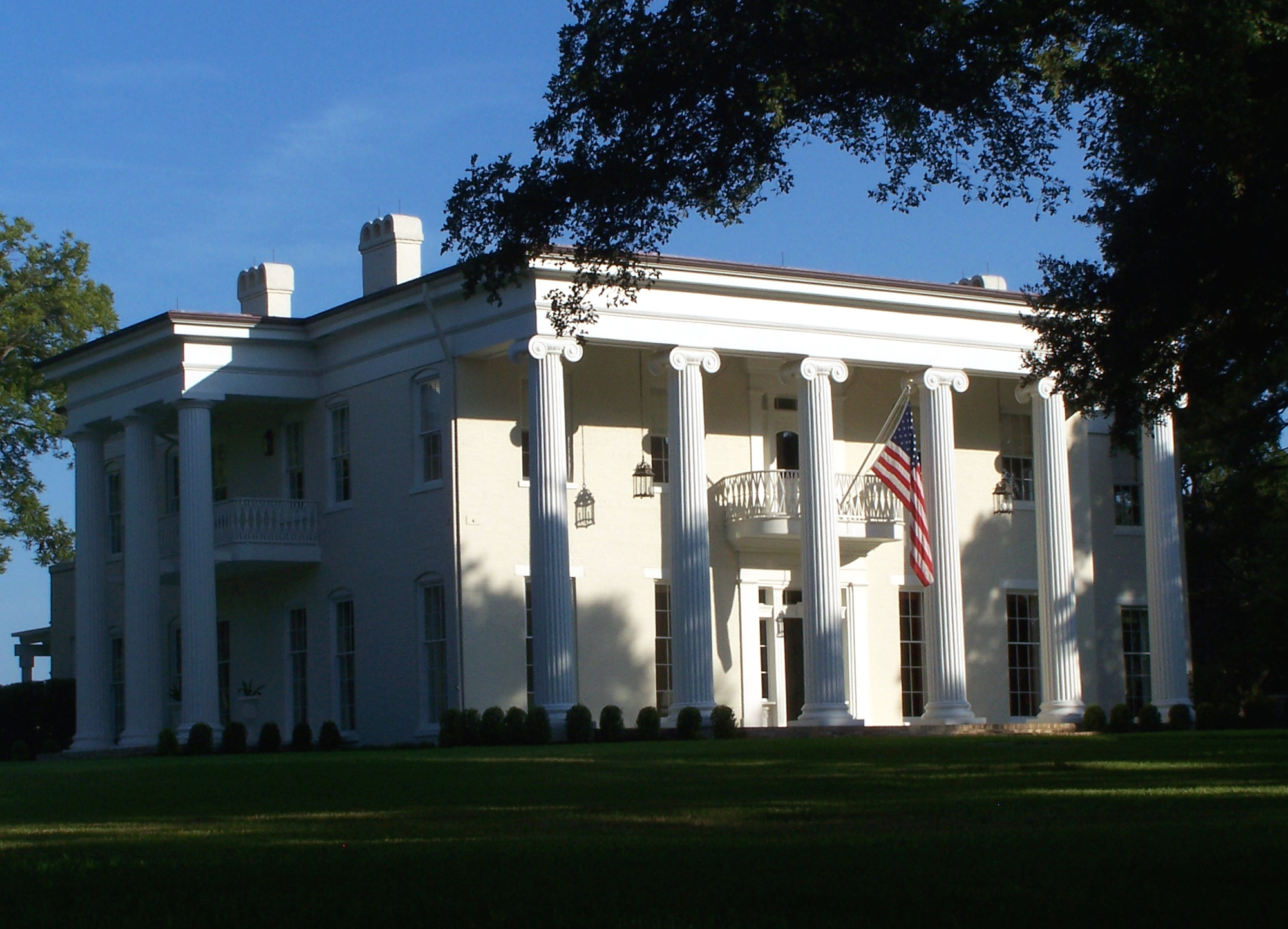
Woodlawn (1853)

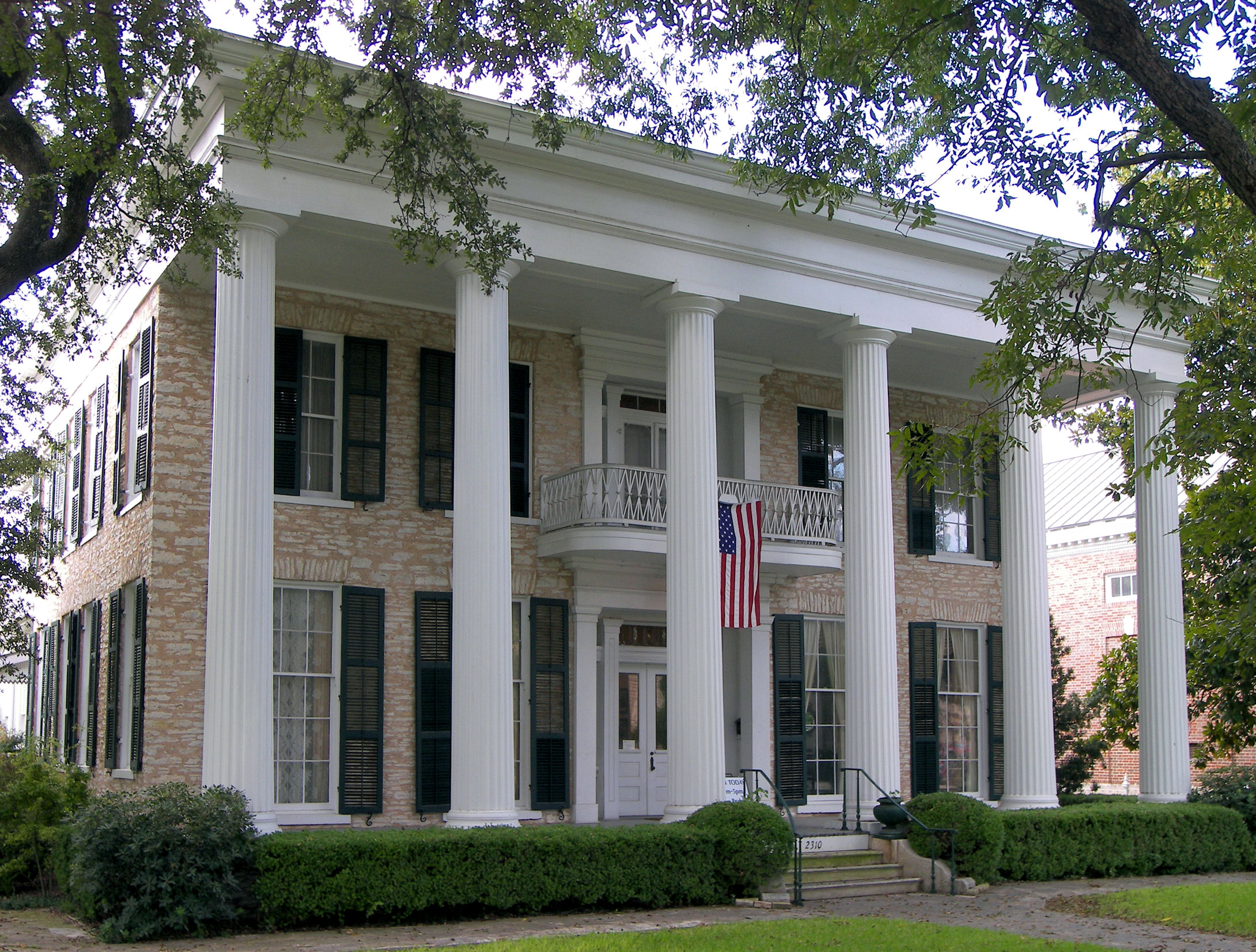
Neill-Cochran House (1855)

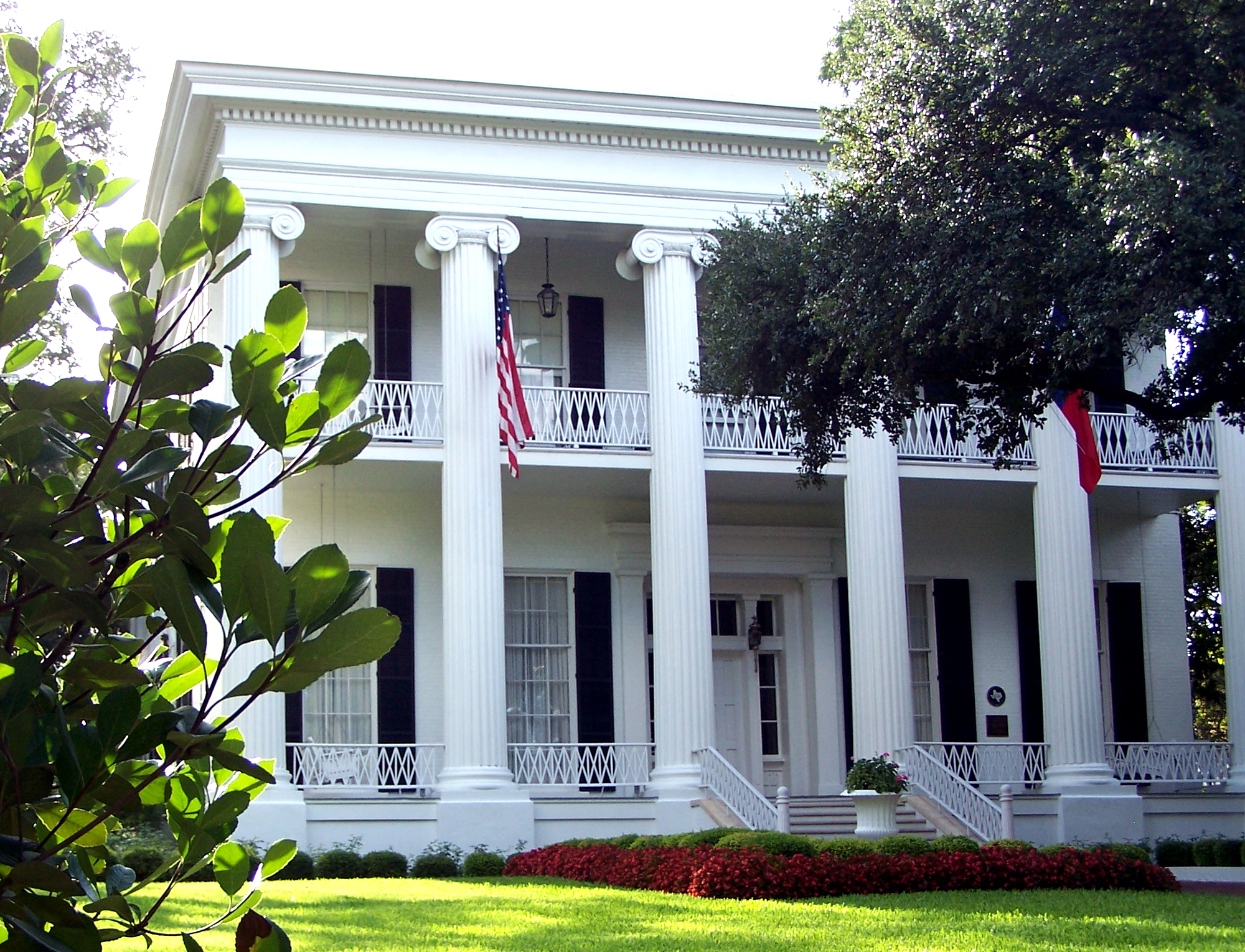
Texas Governor's Mansion (1855)

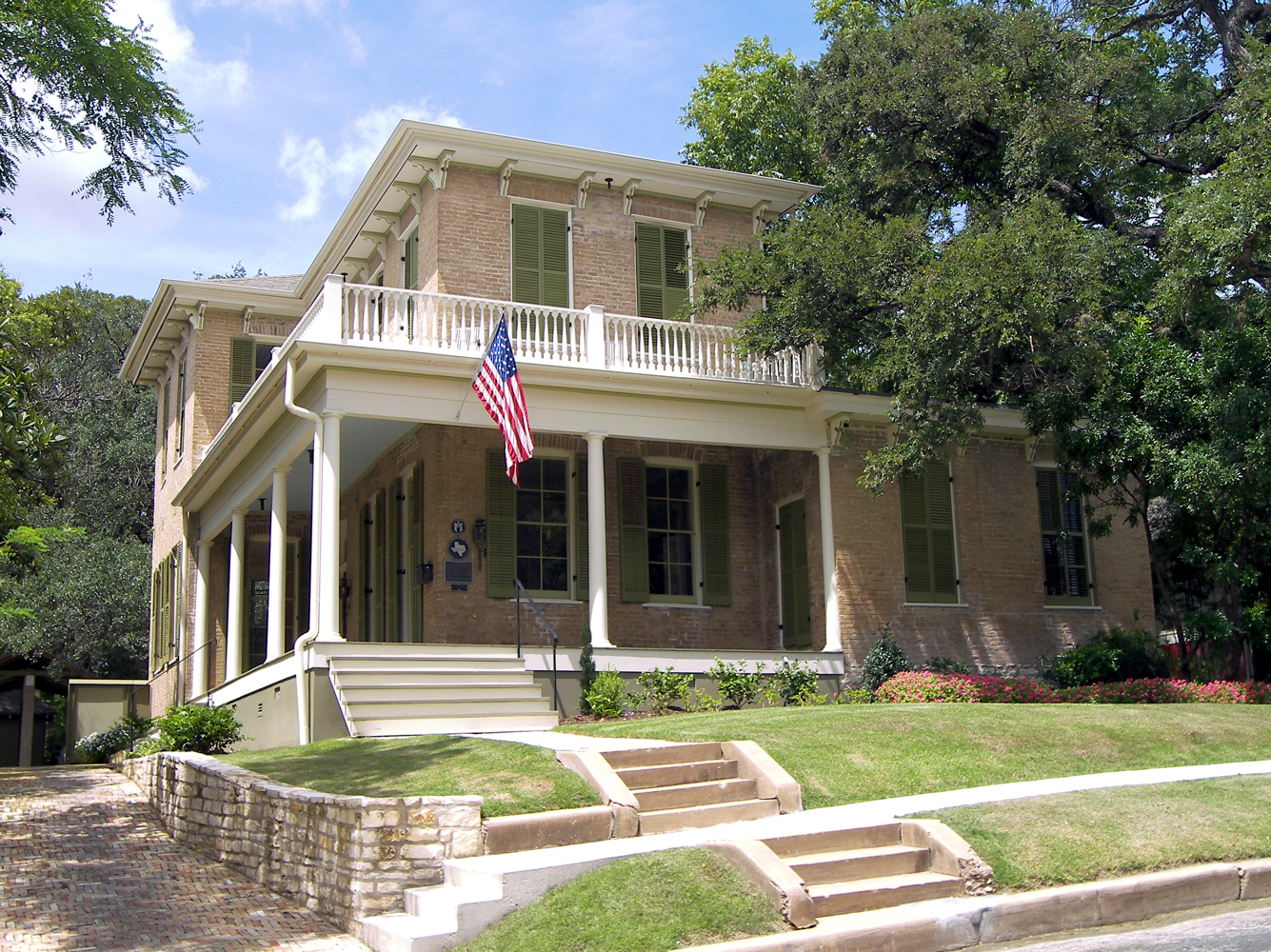
Las Ventanas (1875)

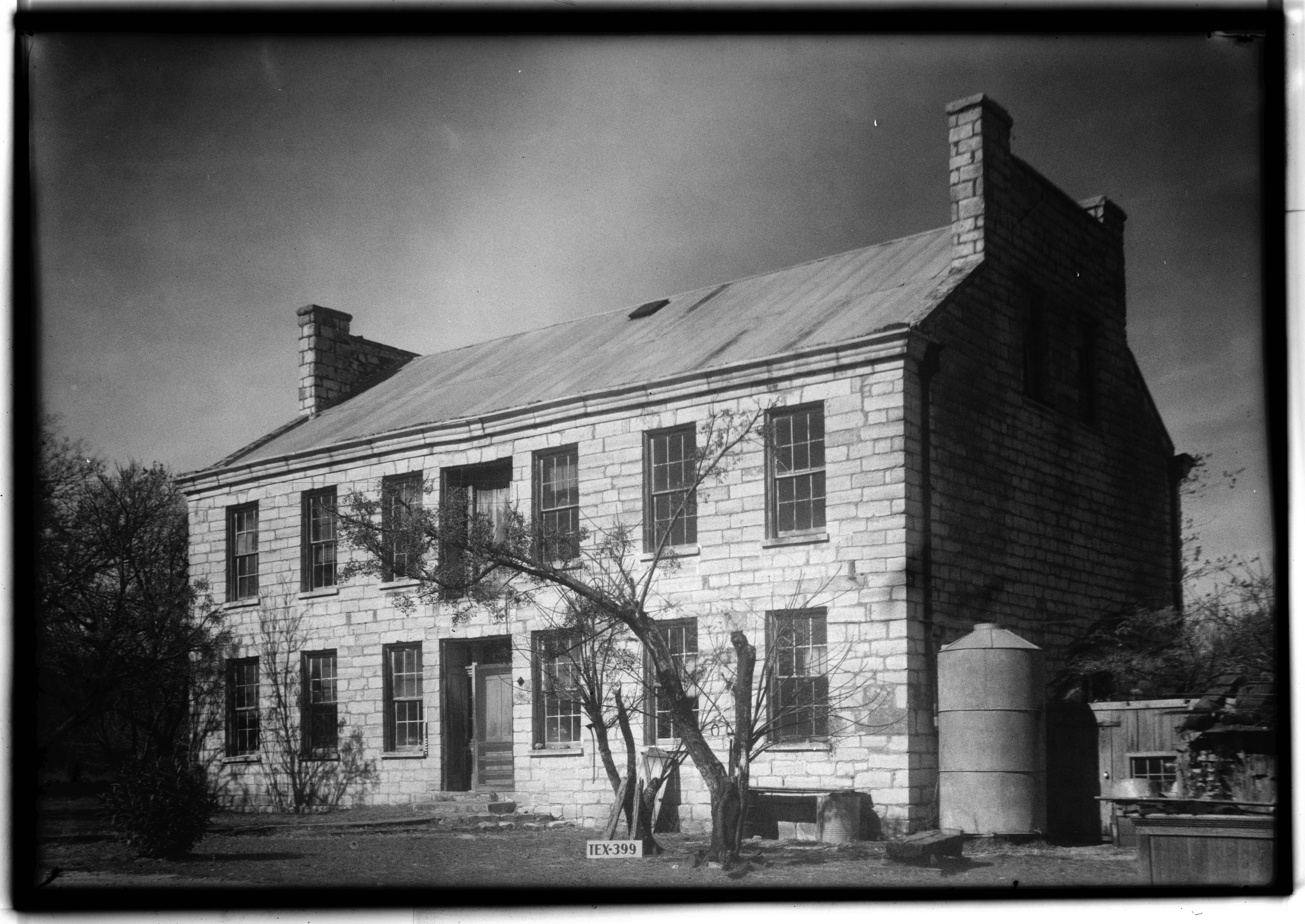
Judge Sebron G. Sneed House (likely designed by Cook)

== Bibliography ==
- Hafertepe, Kenneth (1992). Abner Cook: Master Builder on the Texas Frontier. Austin: Texas State Historical Press. ISBN 0-87611-102-9.
