= Judge Sebron G. Sneed House =

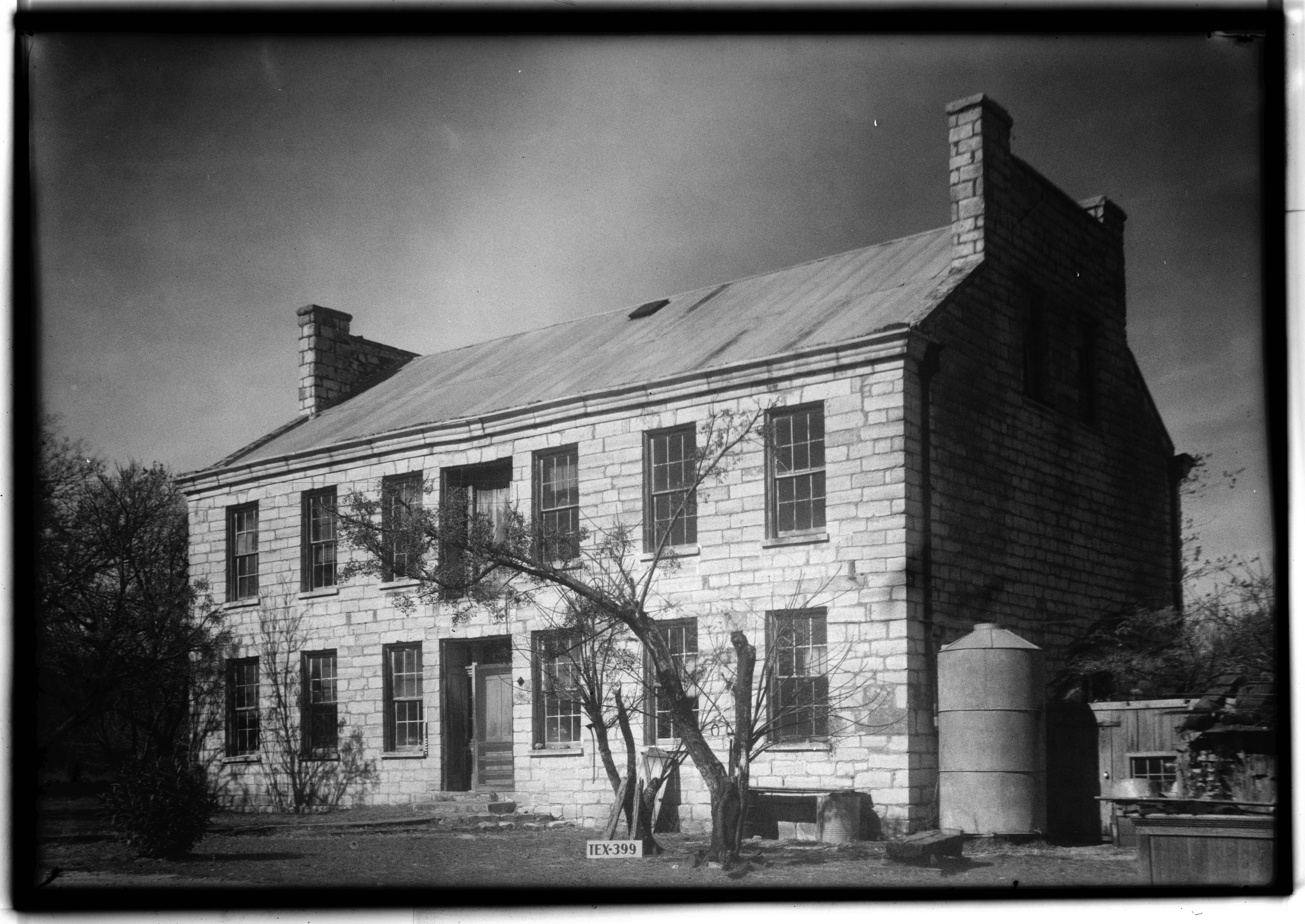
- Judge Sebron G. Sneed House (southeast façade), November 27, 1936

- Location within Texas
- Alternative names: Comal Bluff

General information
- Status: Ruins
- Type: Homestead
- Architectural style: Federal Style
- Location: Southeast of IH-35, Comal Bluff, Dove Springs neighborhood, Travis County, Southeast corner of Bluff Springs Road & Nelms Drive, Austin, Texas, United States
- Coordinates: 30.192236°N 97.764795°W
- Named for: Judge Sebron G. Sneed
- Groundbreaking: 1852
- Completed: 1857
- Destroyed: June 1989

Height
- Roof: 38 feet 4 inches (11.68 m)
- Top floor: 12 feet 6 inches (3.81 m)

Dimensions
- Diameter: 58 feet 4 1/4 inches (17.79 m) × 39 feet 8 1/2 inches (12.10 m)

Technical details
- Material: Limestone & pine
- Floor count: 2
- Grounds: Original farm: 470 acres (190 ha); Current site: 1.73 acres (0.70 ha)

Design and construction
- Architects: Likely, Abner Hugh Cook

Other information
- Number of rooms: 12; 4 bedrooms

The Judge Sebron G. Sneed House (also, Sneed House and Comal Bluff) is a historic former limestone plantation house in Austin, Texas, commissioned by Judge Sebron Graham Sneed, and built between 1852 and 1857. It was likely designed by architect and general contractor, Abner Hugh Cook, co-owner of the sawmill where Sneed had purchased lumber for the construction of the house. Cook is most notable for designing the Texas Governor's Mansion in Austin.

== History ==
In 1848, Judge Sebron Graham Sneed and his family moved to Austin from Fayetteville, Arkansas. In 1850, Sneed purchased a 470-acre farm from the Santiago Del Valle Land Grant for $1000. The homestead was built starting in 1852 by Sneed's slaves and was completed by 1857. The walls of the house were built with limestone that was quarried from the Sneed farm, and brought to the construction site to be finished by hand. Lumber that was used for the floors, roof, and millwork was obtained 30 miles east in Bastrop, Texas. It was likely purchased from the Higgins Mill, a sawmill that had operated out of Lost Pines Forest along Copperas Creek since 1841. It is one of the few surviving pre-Civil War structures in the city.

By 1860, the Sneed family owned 21 slaves. During the Civil War, Sebron Sneed's sons enlisted as soldiers with the Confederacy and the house was used as a recruiting station (or Confederate hospital) during the war. By the end of the war, Abraham Lincoln's Emancipation Proclamation freed the slaves who would have maintained the homestead and farm. Sneed later willed 55 acres of the property and the house at Comal Bluff to his daughter Miranda Bledsoe on July 15, 1871, who then willed the property to her daughter, Rockie Bledsoe by 1916. The family lived on the premises until August 1, 1922, when it was sold with 196.4 acres to Bledsoe's cousin, Calvin L. Hughes for $8000. Hughes then willed the property to his daughter, Virgia Lo Cage, where she lived until her death there sometime in the 1960s.

== Architecture ==
Section drawing of the Sneed House

The first floor of the Sneed House consisted of six rooms; front and rear halls, three parlors (south, west, east), and a kitchen. A stairwell led to the upper story from the rear hall. The second floor also had six rooms; front and rear halls, and four bedrooms with access to the attic via a stairwell in the southeast bedroom. The bedrooms, parlors, and kitchen each had fireplaces. Access to the exterior was through doors located at the front and rear halls of the first and second floor. Later photographs show doors at the upper floor, yet no access to a balcony. It can be assumed that there was once a balcony along both sides of the first and second floors (see McKinney Homestead). Each of the rooms of the homestead had two windows, while the first floor front doors had lights on either side and a transom window above. The attic had two windows at each end. Floors of each of the rooms were finished with 6–8 inches (150–200 mm) wide pine planks. Each of the downstairs rooms had exposed ceilings, except for the kitchen which had a beaded ceiling and the south parlor which was plastered. Rooms along the north end and rear hall had unplastered limestone interior walls, while the kitchen and south parlor walls were plastered. The ceilings and walls of all of the upstairs rooms were plastered. Hearths were originally limestone. Those in the east parlors and kitchen were covered with concrete, while the original stone hearth in the west parlor was replaced with brick during renovations after 1900. Another exterior door was added to the east end of the house through the east parlor during this time. Four chimneys graced the exterior of the house.

== Conservation status ==
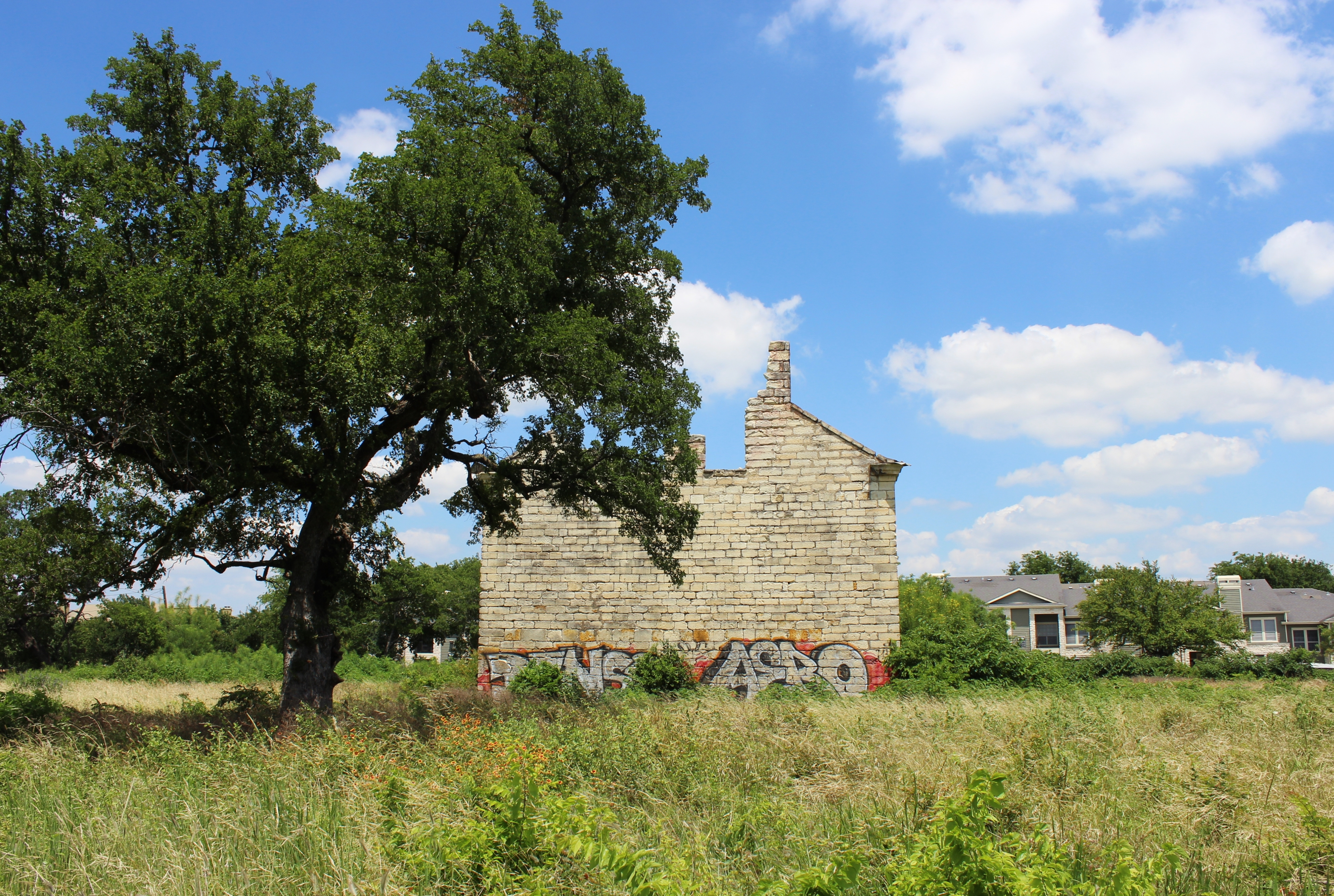
Current condition of the homestead, June 2015

Efforts to document the site were taken in on November 27, 1936 when photographs were taken, and from August to September 1961 when architectural drawings were made of the homestead. The latter program was financed from the National Park Service's "Mission 66" Project funds. After the death of Virgia Lo Cage in the 1960s, the homestead fell into a state of disrepair. During the years following, the conditions of the home began to deteriorate. Windows were boarded up, pine millwork and other interior elements were stolen, and the white plaster walls and exterior walls were vandalized with graffiti. The Sneed House burned down in July 1989, and currently sits in ruin where only portions of the stone walls, such as the majority of the west and east exterior walls and sections of some of the interior walls remain standing. It has yet to be registered with the National Register of Historic Places.

Local resident Bobby Cervantes has made efforts to save the site from being demolished and redeveloped into an apartment complex by its current owners, Indo Pak Investments LLC. Cervantes was successful in preserving the nearby Sneed family burial plot, known as the Sneed Family Cemetery, where the Judge and wife are resting, as well as Williamson Creek Cemetery where former slaves of the household were also known to have been buried.

== Gallery ==
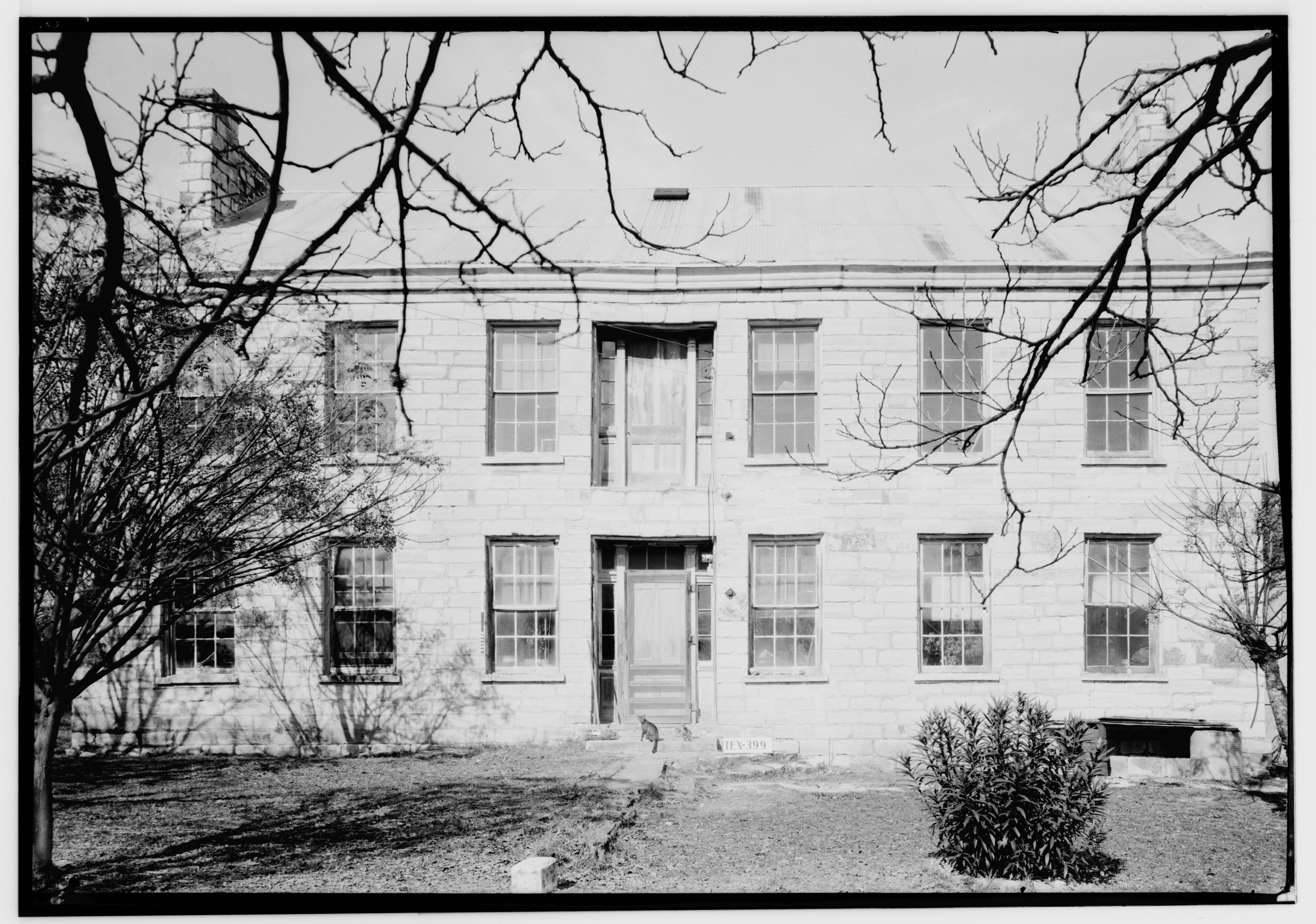
South façade

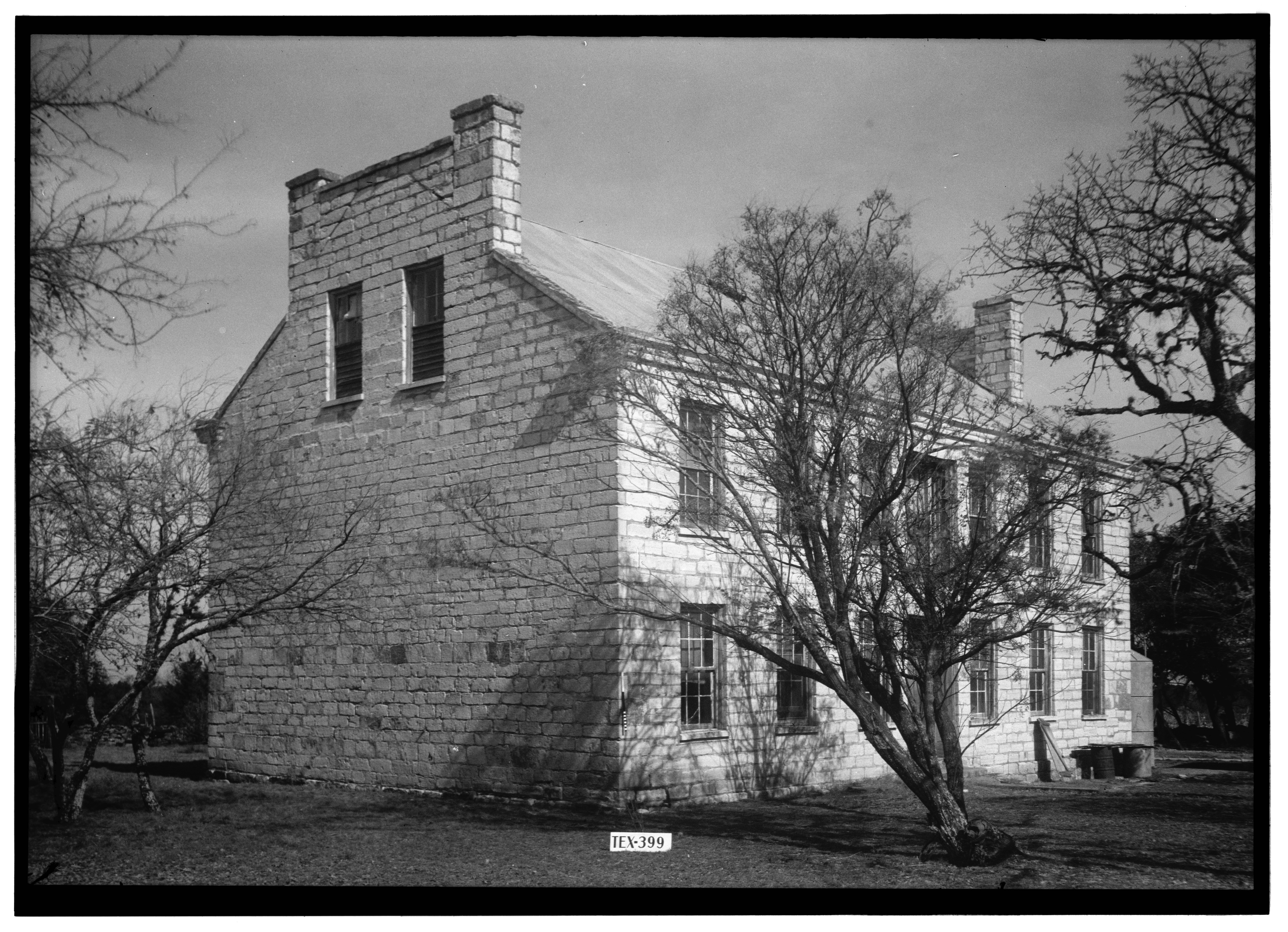
Southwest façade

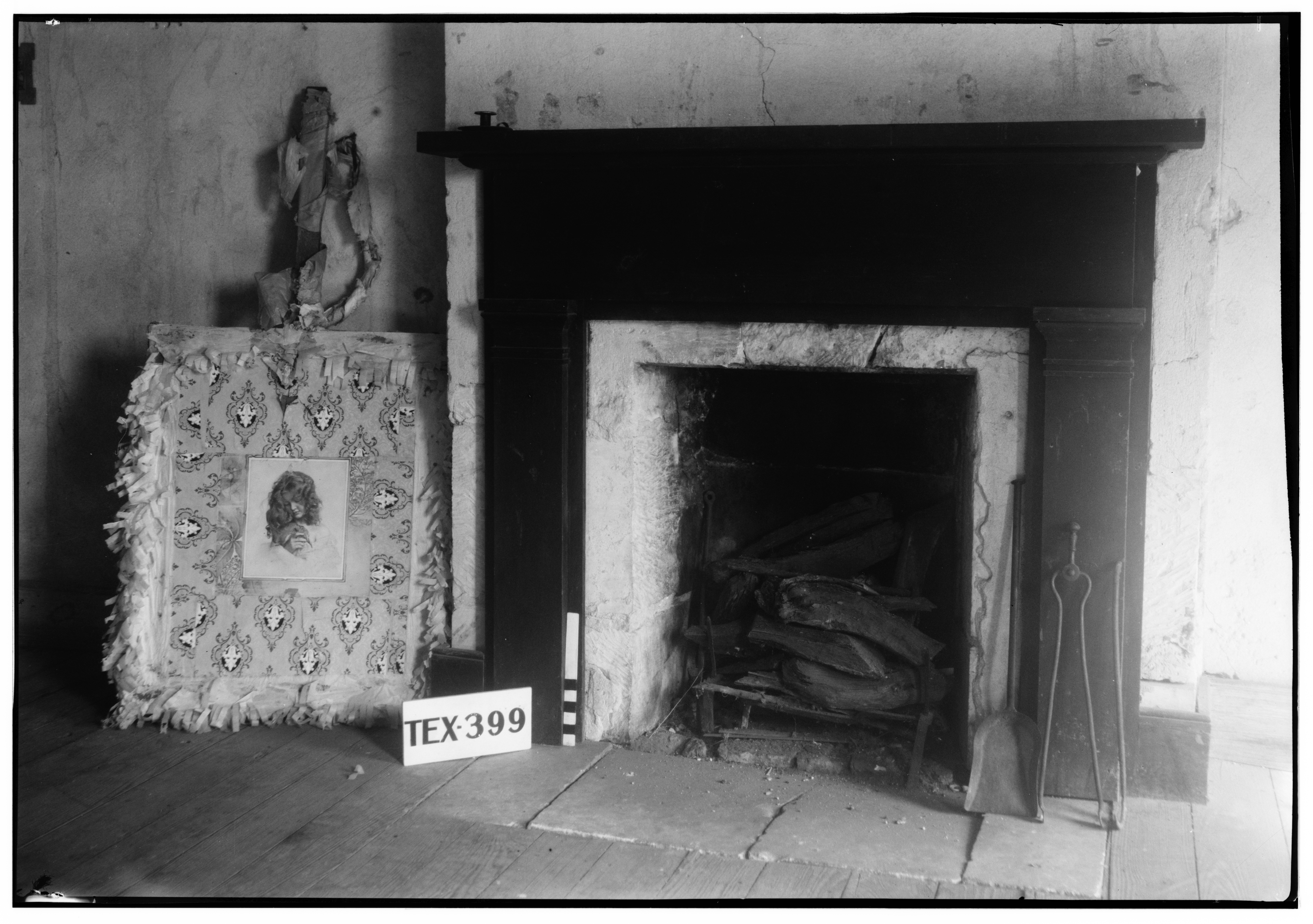
Second floor fireplace in the southwest bedroom

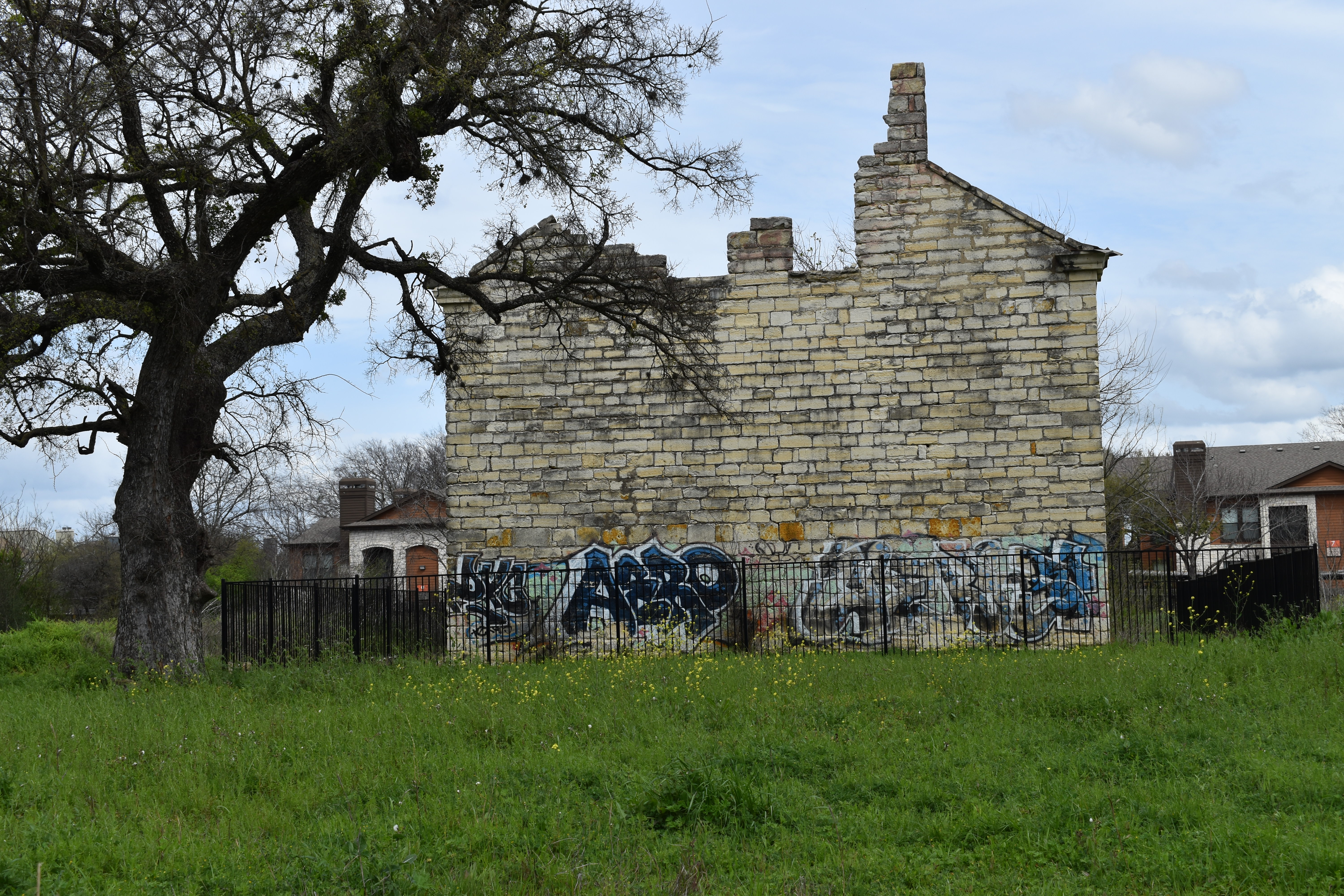
House in 2020

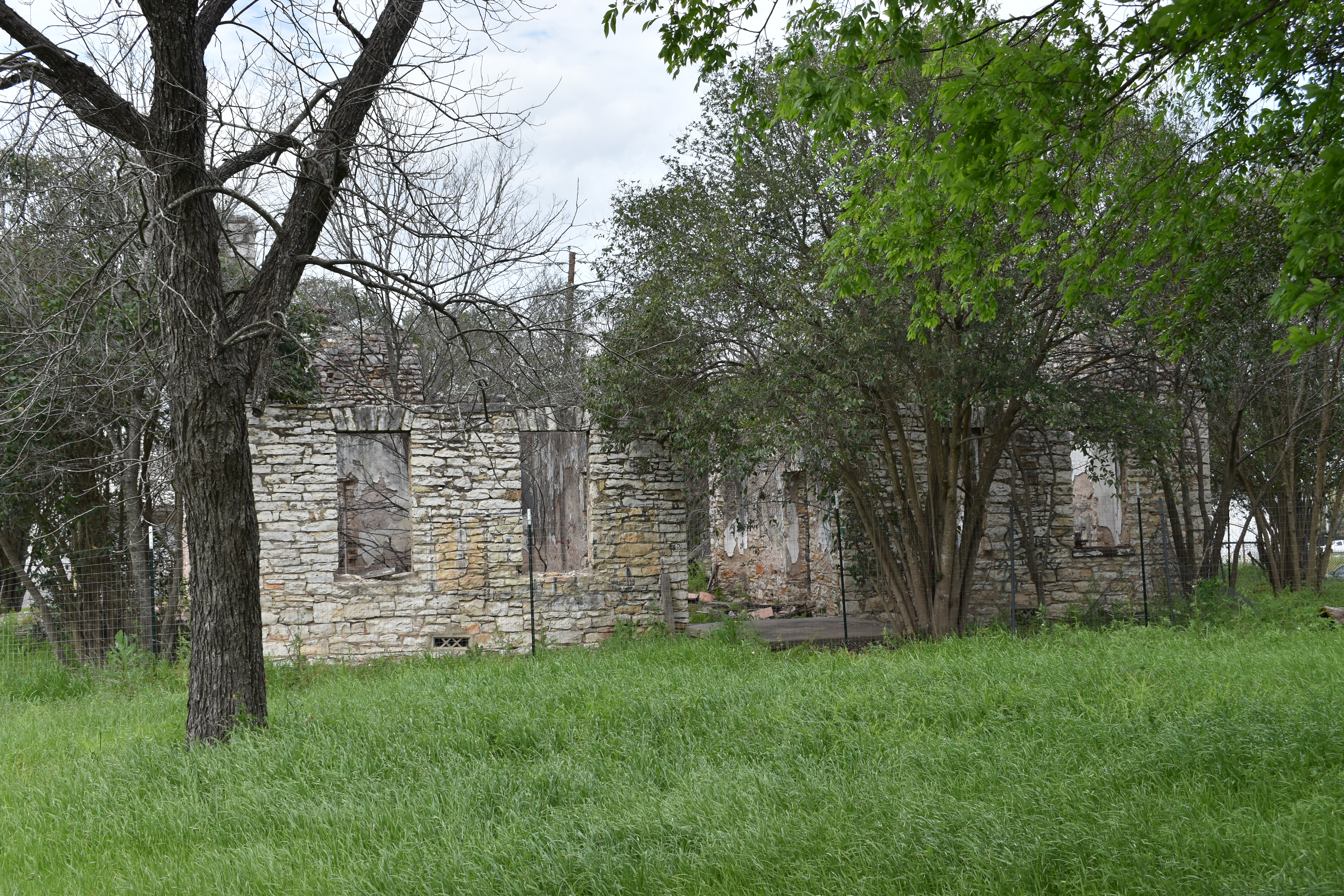
Corresponding slave quarters on Bluff Springs Road

== See also ==
- List of National Historic Landmarks in Texas
- National Register of Historic Places listings in Texas
