= Snead =

Snead is a family surname of English origin. It derives from the Middle English word snede (Old English snǣd), meaning "a detached piece of land or woodland", and identified someone who lived in or came from such a location. It has its geographical origin in the English counties of Staffordshire and Worcestershire. Common variations include Sneyd, Sneed, Sneath, Sneede and Snede.

Snead may refer to:

== Surname ==
- Doak Snead (1949–2020), American musician
- Esix Snead (born 1976), American baseball player
- J. C. Snead (1940–2025), American golfer, nephew of Sam Snead
- Jevan Snead (1987–2019), American college football player
- John Snead, American role-playing game designer
- Kirby Snead (born 1994), American baseball player
- Louise Hammond Willis Snead (1870–1958), American writer, lecturer, artist
- Malcolm L. Snead, American dental and biomineralization researcher, professor
- Norm Snead (1939–2024), American football player
- Ocey Snead (1885–1909), American murder victim
- Sam Snead (1912–2002), American golfer
- Willie Snead (born 1992), American football player

== Given name ==
- Angus Snead Macdonald (1883-1961), American businessman

== Places ==
- Snead, Powys, village, Wales, United Kingdom
- Snead, Alabama, town, United States
- Snead State Community College, Boaz, Alabama, United States, named after local businessman John H. Snead
- Snead, Georgia, unincorporated community, United States

== See also ==
- Sneed (disambiguation)
- Sneyd (disambiguation)
