= Sneyd =

Sneyd is a family surname of English origin. It derives from the Middle English word snede (Old English snǣd), meaning "a detached piece of land or woodland", and identified someone who lived in or came from such a location. It has its geographical origin in the English counties of Staffordshire and Worcestershire. Common variations include Snead, Sneed, Sneath, Sneede and Snede.

- Doug Sneyd (1931–2025), Canadian cartoonist
- Honora Sneyd (1751–1780), English writer
- John Sneyd (1734–1809), English landowner
- Lewis Sneyd (1788–1858), English clergyman, Warden of All Souls College, Oxford and curator of what is now the Ashmolean Museum
- Marc Sneyd (born 1991), English rugby league footballer
- Nathaniel Sneyd (c. 1767–1833), Irish politician, landowner and businessman
- Ralph Sneyd (landowner) (1793–1870), English landowner, known for the rebuilding of Keele Hall, Keele, Staffordshire, England
- Ralph Sneyd (MP for Stafford) (1564–1643), English politician and Royalist army officer of the English Civil War
- Ralph Sneyd (MP for Staffordshire) (1692–1733), English politician
- Walter Sneyd (1752–1829), English politician
- Wettenhall Sneyd (1676–1745), an 18th-century English Anglican priest in Ireland
- William Sneyd (footballer) (1895–1985), English footballer
- William Sneyd (MP for Lichfield) (c. 1693–1745), English politician
- William Sneyd (MP for Staffordshire) (c. 1614–1695), English politician
- Charles Walter Sneyd-Kynnersley (1849–1904), British colonial administrator
