= Joseph P. Sneed =

- Born: Joseph Perkins Sneed; January 10, 1804; Davidson County, Tennessee, U.S.
- Died: November 21, 1881 (aged 77); Milam County, Texas, U.S.
- Occupation: Preacher
- Spouse: Achsah Bond Harris (1814–1850)
- Children: Cassandra Emily Sneed (1843–1866); James William Sneed (1845–1922); Joseph Tyre Sneed Sr. (1848–1912)
- Parent(s): James Sneed (1764–1853); Bethenia Harden Perkins (1770–1812)
- Relatives: Joseph Tyree Sneed III great-great-grandson Carly Fiorina (great-great-great-granddaughter); William Henry Sneed (first cousin)

Reverend Joseph Perkins Sneed (January 10, 1804 – November 21, 1881) was an American preacher, farmer and educator. A minister of the Methodist Episcopal Church, South, he established the first-ever Methodist church in Waco, Texas. Prior to and during the course of the American Civil War, he converted many enslaved persons to the Methodist faith.

== Early life ==
Joseph P. Sneed was born on January 10, 1804, in Davidson County, Tennessee, near Nashville. His father was James Sneed (1764–1853) and his mother, Behania Harden Perkins (1770–1812). His brother Constantine Sneed (1790-1864) built the Constantine Sneed House in Brentwood, Tennessee. William Henry Sneed was the son of his father's brother William Sneed (1776–1835).

Sneed was ordained as an elder of the Methodist Episcopal Church, South, by Bishop John Emory in 1833.

== Career ==
Sneed was a preacher of the Methodist Episcopal Church, South. He preached sermons from a log cabin off the banks of the Brazos River in Waco, Texas in 1850. His log cabin was the first Methodist church in Waco.

Meanwhile, Sneed was also a farmer, first in Gay Hill, Washington County and later in Port Sullivan, Texas, where he founded the Port Sullivan Male and Female Institute (also known as the Port Sullivan College).

Prior to the American Civil War, from 1855 to 1861, Sneed helped convert enslaved persons to the Methodist faith at the Port Royal African Mission in Texas. After taking a year off in 1861, he resumed his ministry with blacks during the course of the war, from 1862 to 1865.

== Personal life and death ==
Sneed married Achsah Bond Harris in 1842. They had three children.

Sneed died on November 21, 1881, in Milam County, Texas.

== Descendants ==
Descendants of Joseph Perkins Sneed (1804–1881)

Joseph Perkins Sneed (1804–1881) married Achsah Bond Harris (1814–1850)

1. Cassandra Emily Sneed (1843–1866)
2. James William Sneed (1845–1922)
  1. Ruth Linda Sneed (1895–1996)
3. Joseph Tyre Sneed I (1848–1912)
  1. Joseph Tyre Sneed II (1876–1940)
    1. Harold Marvin Sneed I (1883–1934)
      1. Joseph Tyree Sneed III (1920–2008) married Madelon Juergens
        1. Carly Sneed
        2. Clara Sneed
        3. Joseph Tyree Sneed IV
