= William J. Sneed =

American Confederate veteran, surgeon and educator

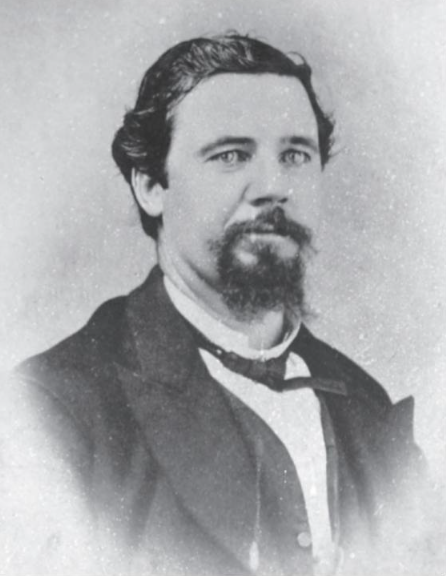
- Born: 1835; Brentwood, Tennessee, U.S.
- Died: March 17, 1907 (aged 71–72); Nashville, Tennessee, U.S.
- Resting place: Mount Olivet Cemetery
- Education: University of Nashville
- Occupations: Surgeon, educator
- Spouse: Fannie Sneed
- Military career
- Allegiance: Confederate States of America (1861–1865)
- Branch: Confederate States Army
- Service years: 1861–1865
- Rank: Surgeon

William J. Sneed (1835 - March 17, 1907) was an American Confederate veteran, surgeon and educator. He was the co-founder of Meharry Medical College in Nashville, Tennessee; it was the first medical school in the South for African Americans.

== Early life ==
William J. Sneed was born in 1835 in Brentwood, Tennessee. He graduated from the School of Medicine at the University of Nashville.

== Career ==
Sneed started his career as a surgeon in Kentucky. During the American Civil War of 1861–1865, he served as a surgeon in the Confederate States Army.

By 1870, Sneed served as Professor of Surgery at his alma mater, the University of Nashville. He was appointed as Professor of Anatomy in 1873. He continued after this university department was renamed as the Vanderbilt University School of Medicine.

With George W. Hubbard and Reverend John Braden, Sneed co-founded Meharry Medical College in 1876, a medical school for freedmen. It became the first medical school in the South for African Americans, most of whom had been slaves before the war.

== Marriage and family ==
Sneed married Hannie Sugars (4 January 1836 – 8 March 1900) of Nashville. They were living on Ash Street at the time of her death at the age of 64.

After his first wife's death, the widower Sneed married Fannie Sullivan in 1903. He was a member of the Presbyterian Church, and a Master Mason in Freemasonry.

== Death ==
Sneed died on March 17, 1907, in Nashville, Tennessee, at age 72. He was buried at the Mount Olivet Cemetery in Nashville.
