= Joseph D. Sneed =

American philosopher (1938–2020)

Joseph D. Sneed (September 23, 1938 – February 7, 2020) was an American physicist, and philosopher at the Colorado School of Mines. Sneed died on February 7, 2020, at the age of 81.

== Early life ==
He was born in Durant, Oklahoma. His father, Dabney W. Sneed, was a civil servant with the Postal Service and later an architect for the Federal Housing Administration. His mother, Sallabelle Atkison Sneed, was a homemaker and elementary school teacher.

== Education ==
He attended public schools in Durant, Oklahoma and Tulsa, Oklahoma. He received a B.S. in physics from Rice University in 1960, an MS in physics from the University of Illinois in 1962 and a Ph.D. in philosophy from Stanford University in 1964. His mentor at Stanford was Patrick Suppes. His view of the nature of philosophy was shaped at Stanford by Donald Davidson. At Stanford he was also a student of Richard C. Jeffrey.

== Work ==
With his book The Logical Structure of Mathematical Physics, published in 1971, and other contributions to the philosophy of science Sneed founded the structural theory of the empirical sciences. He was influenced by and influenced Wolfgang Stegmuller and Thomas Kuhn.

== Bibliography ==
- J. D. Sneed, The Logical Structure of Mathematical Physics. Reidel, Dordrecht, 1971 (revised edition 1979).
- W. Balzer, C. U. Moulines, J. D. Sneed, An Architectonic for Science: the Structuralist Approach. Reidel, Dordrecht, 1987.

== See also ==
- American philosophy
- List of American philosophers
