= Joseph Tyree Sneed III =

American judge (1920–2008)

Senior Judge of the United States Court of Appeals for the Ninth Circuit
- In office July 21, 1987 – February 9, 2008

Judge of the United States Court of Appeals for the Ninth Circuit
- In office August 24, 1973 – July 21, 1987
- Appointed by: Richard Nixon
- Preceded by: Frederick George Hamley
- Succeeded by: Stephen S. Trott

12th United States Deputy Attorney General
- In office February 1973 – July 9, 1973
- President: Richard Nixon
- Preceded by: Ralph E. Erickson
- Succeeded by: William Ruckelshaus

Personal details
- Born: Joseph Tyree Sneed III; July 21, 1920 Calvert, Texas, U.S.
- Died: February 9, 2008 (aged 87) San Francisco, California, U.S.
- Party: Republican
- Spouse: Madelon Sneed
- Children: 3, including Carly Fiorina
- Relatives: Joseph P. Sneed (great-great-grandfather)
- Education: Southwestern University (BBA); University of Texas at Austin (LLB); Harvard University (SJD)

Joseph Tyree Sneed III (July 21, 1920 – February 9, 2008) was an American jurist who served as United States Deputy Attorney General and then as a United States circuit judge of the United States Court of Appeals for the Ninth Circuit for nearly 35 years until his death. He was the father of Carly Fiorina, a former CEO of Hewlett-Packard.

== Early life and education ==
Joseph Tyree Sneed III was born on July 21, 1920, in Calvert, Texas. He was the son of Cara Carlton (Weber) and Harold Marvin Sneed (January 6, 1883 – Dec 27, 1934), a rancher and landowner. Joseph P. Sneed is his great-great-grandfather. He spent his youth working summers as a cowboy on his uncle's ranch in the Texas Panhandle.

Sneed received his Bachelor of Business Administration degree from Southwestern University in 1941. He served as a staff sergeant in the Army Air Corps during World War II. Sneed attended the University of Texas School of Law, where he received his Bachelor of Laws, Order of the Coif in 1947. He was also a visiting student at the London School of Economics and the University of Ghana. He subsequently received a Doctor of Juridical Science from Harvard Law School in 1958.

== Career ==
=== Academia ===
Sneed was an assistant professor of law at the University of Texas School of Law from 1947 to 1951. He became an associate professor in 1951 and was made a full professor in 1954. He taught at the University of Texas until 1957.

Sneed was a professor of law at Cornell Law School from 1957 to 1962, followed by the Stanford Law School from 1962 to 1971. He was professor of law and dean of the Duke University School of Law from 1971 to 1973.

=== Judicial service ===
Sneed was nominated by President Richard Nixon to a seat vacated (formerly occupied) by Judge Frederick George Hamley on the United States Court of Appeals for the Ninth Circuit on July 25, 1973. He was confirmed by the United States Senate on August 3, 1973, and received his judicial commission on August 24, 1973. He assumed senior status on July 21, 1987.

Sneed was part of a three-judge panel that replaced Whitewater special prosecutor Robert B. Fiske with Kenneth Starr in 1994.

== Personal life ==
Sneed married Madelon Montross Juergens in 1944. She was a portrait and abstract artist who died in 1998. Together they had a son and two daughters, including Carly Fiorina, another daughter, Clara; a son, Joseph T. Sneed IV; and two grandsons, Sam Tyree Berzon and Joseph T. Sneed V. His wife died in 1998. They resided in San Francisco, California.

== Death ==
Sneed died on February 9, 2008, in San Francisco at the age of 87.

== Sources ==
Academic offices
Preceded by A. Kenneth Pye	Dean of the Duke University School of Law; 1971–1973	Succeeded by A. Kenneth Pye
Legal offices
Preceded by Ralph E. Erickson	United States Deputy Attorney General; 1973	Succeeded by William Ruckelshaus
Preceded by Frederick George Hamley	Judge of the United States Court of Appeals for the Ninth Circuit; 1973–1987	Succeeded by Stephen S. Trott
