= William Henry Sneed =

American politician (1812–1869)

Member of the U.S. House of Representatives from Tennessee's 2nd district
- In office March 4, 1855 – March 3, 1857
- Preceded by: William Churchwell
- Succeeded by: Horace Maynard

Personal details
- Born: August 27, 1812 Davidson County, Tennessee, US
- Died: September 18, 1869 (aged 57) Knoxville, Tennessee, US
- Party: Whig Party; American Party; Democratic Party
- Spouse: Eliza Williams
- Children: Joseph Sneed; Thomas Sneed; Kate Sneed (Jones); Fannie Sneed (Eldridge)
- Relatives: Joseph P. Sneed (first cousin)
- Profession: Attorney, Politician

William Henry Sneed (August 27, 1812 – September 18, 1869) was an American attorney and politician, active initially in Murfreesboro, Tennessee, and later in Knoxville, Tennessee, during the mid-19th century. He was a member of the United States House of Representatives for Tennessee's 2nd congressional district during the Thirty-fourth Congress (1855–1857). In the months leading up to the Civil War, he became a leader of Knoxville's secessionist movement. Along with his successful career as an attorney, Sneed was involved in several business ventures, most notably the Lamar House Hotel, which he purchased in 1856.

== Biography ==
=== Early life and career ===
Sneed was born in rural Davidson County, Tennessee on August 27, 1812. After completing preparatory studies, he moved with his father's family to Rutherford County. He studied law, was admitted to the bar in 1834, and commenced practice in Murfreesboro. In 1839, he formed a partnership with Judge Charles Ready, which lasted until 1843.

From 1843 to 1845, Sneed represented Rutherford County and Williamson County in the Tennessee Senate. When the senate met in October 1843, Sneed and Warren County senator Samuel Laughlin led a failed attempt to have the state capital moved from Nashville to Murfreesboro, arguing that the residents of the former city (primarily financiers and businessmen) were not representative of the state as a whole. After his senate term, he moved briefly to Greeneville, where he formed a law partnership with Robert J. McKinney. By the end of 1845, Sneed had relocated to Knoxville to practice law.

=== 1850s ===
In Knoxville, Sneed quickly became acquainted with the city's business and political leaders. In the late 1840s, he successfully represented the newly formed Hancock County in a lawsuit that attempted to thwart the county's creation, and the new county honored him by naming its county seat Sneedville. He formed a law partnership with powerful attorney Oliver Perry Temple (1820–1907), and gained renown for his ability to argue chancery court cases. In 1856, he purchased the Lamar House Hotel from William Montgomery Churchwell, who had renovated and expanded it in the early 1850s.

Sneed served in the United States House of Representatives from March 4, 1855 to March 3, 1857. Originally a Whig, Sneed ran on the American Party ticket in the wake of the Whig Party's nationwide collapse. During his Congressional tenure, he was the chairman of the United States House Committee on Mileage. He declined to be a candidate for renomination in 1856, and also refused a nomination for circuit judge. By the end of the decade, Sneed had aligned himself with the Democratic Party.

=== Civil War ===
Sneed initially opposed the idea of secession, but by the late 1850s, his sentiments had shifted. This brought him into conflict with his long-time friend, William "Parson" Brownlow, radical publisher of the pro-Union Knoxville Whig. On February 2, 1861, Sneed published a circular in the Whig arguing that secession was already a fact, and that East Tennesseans should avoid bloody conflict against fellow Southerners. Realizing that mountainous East Tennessee would not be sympathetic to complaints of Southern planters, Sneed went to great lengths to show how the abolition of slavery would harm poor Southern whites, arguing that emancipation would lead to higher taxes and greater competition for manual labor jobs.

Sneed remained in Knoxville through the first half of the war. On June 20, 1863, he helped thwart an attempted raid of the city by General William P. Sanders. When Union forces occupied Knoxville later that year, however, Sneed was forced to flee to Bristol, and remained in exile until the end of the war. Burnside's successor as commander of Knoxville's Union forces, Joseph Foster, used Sneed's house at the corner of Cumberland Avenue and Market Street as his headquarters.

In early 1864, Brownlow, who was initially cordial toward Sneed on account of their pre-war friendship, had turned outright hostile. Sneed's name was among those enumerated by Brownlow as "Imps of Hell" who deserved to "die the deaths of traitors." Brownlow also filed a lawsuit against Sneed, leading to the seizure and auctioning off of the Lamar House Hotel. In 1865, when it was rumored Sneed was going to take the Oath of Allegiance and return to Knoxville, Brownlow's son and successor as Whig editor, John Bell Brownlow, called on Union soldiers to assassinate Sneed.

=== Later life ===
Sneed returned to Knoxville in 1867. He resumed the practice of law, and managed to recover some of his property, including the Lamar House Hotel. He died suddenly on September 18, 1869, and was interred in Old Gray Cemetery. His children continued to operate the Lamar House until the 1890s. In the Standard History of Knoxville, edited by Brownlow protégé William Rule, Sneed was described as "one of the most painstaking, laborious and able lawyers of his time."

U.S. House of Representatives
| Preceded by William M. Churchwell | Member of the U.S. House of Representatives from Tennessee's 2nd congressional district 1855–1857 | Succeeded by Horace Maynard |
