= December 1924 =

Month of 1924

<<	December 1924					>>
Su	Mo	Tu	We	Th	Fr	Sa
	1	2	3	4	5	6
7	8	9	10	11	12	13
14	15	16	17	18	19	20
21	22	23	24	25	26	27
28	29	30	31

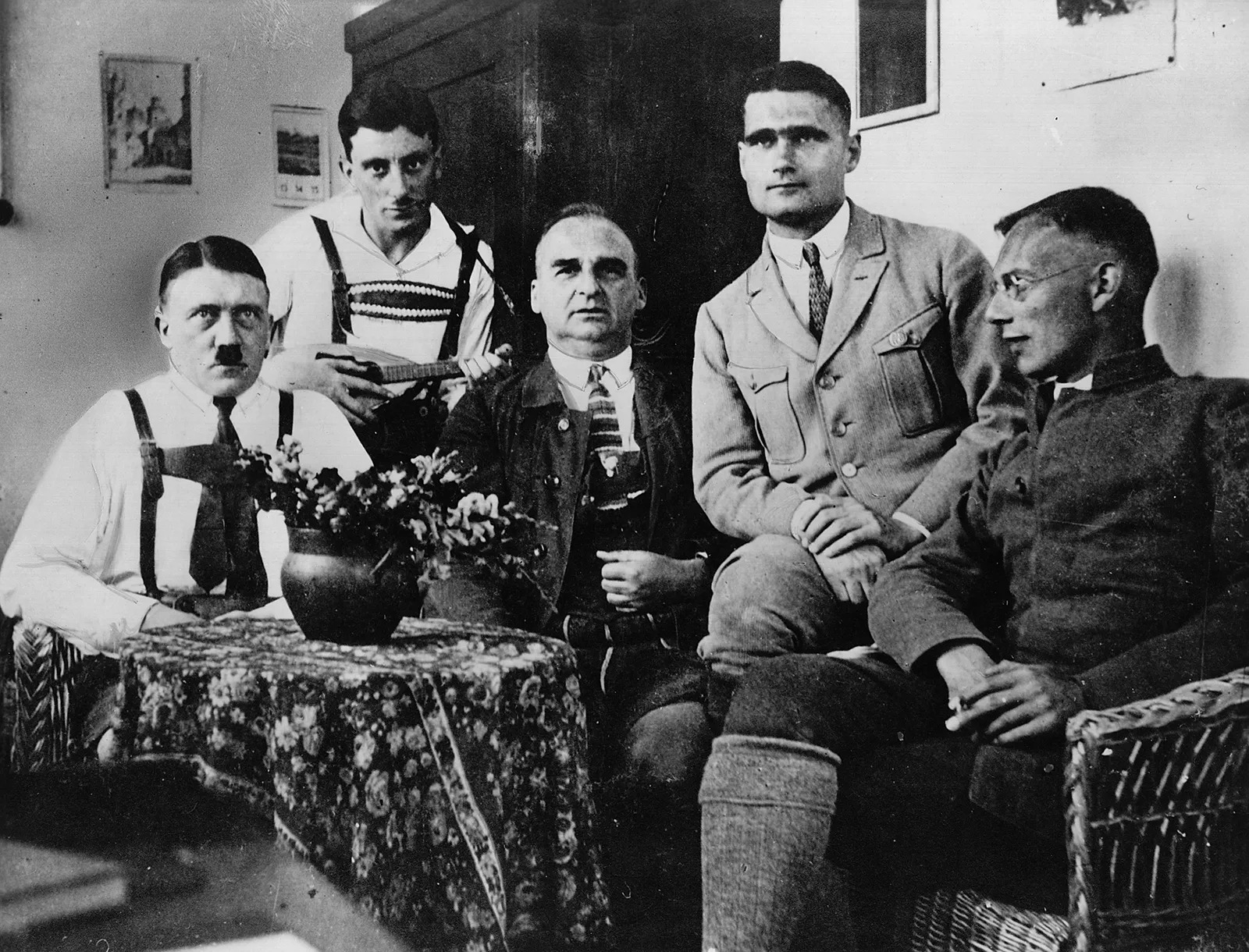
December 20, 1924: Adolf Hitler (far left) and Hermann Kriebel (center) released from Landsberg Prison after 13 months incarceration, followed by Rudolf Hess (fourth) on December 30

The following events occurred in December 1924:

== December 1, 1924 (Monday) ==
- An attempt by Communists to overthrow the government of Estonia failed, leaving 125 of the 335 rebels dead, and 500 more arrested. The Estonian Army lost 26 soldiers and cadets. Communist International (Comintern), based in the Soviet Union, had ordered the Estonian Communist Party to stage the coup and provided weapons. The rebels attacked a dormitory for cadets of the Estonian Military Academy with grenades, but fled when the cadets fought back. The Toompea Castle in Tallinn and a military airfield at Lasnamäe were briefly under Communist control, but within five hours after the 5:00 a.m. start, government forces had defeated the rebels.
- Boston Arena hosted the first National Hockey League game ever played in the United States as the NHL's two newest franchises, with the Boston Bruins and the Montreal Maroons. Boston won, 2 to 1. Smokey Harris scored the first-ever Bruins goal.
- Plutarco Elías Calles was inaugurated to a 4-year term as the 47th President of Mexico.
- From Latakia, leaders of the Alawite State within the semi-autonomous Syrian Federation announced that they would not join the states of Aleppo and Damascus in the creation of the State of Syria.
- An agreement to start the first chapter of the Ku Klux Klan in Canada was signed between C. Lewis Fowler of New York City and Richard L. Cowan of Toronto. Cowan named himself the Imperial Wizard of the white supremacist Knights of Ku Klux Klan of Canada on January 1.
- Fritz Angerstein, an official with a limestone mine in the German town of Haiger, murdered eight people in the villa where he lived, killing his wife, his mother-in-law and sister-in-law, his maid and two gardeners, and two of his fellow workers. He would be executed by beheading on November 17, 1925.
- The musical Lady, Be Good, with music by George and lyrics by Ira Gershwin, and starring Fred Astaire and sister Adele Astaire, opened at the Liberty Theatre on Broadway for the first of 330 performances. It closed on September 12, 1925.
- The drama film Romola, starring Lillian Gish, premiered at George M. Cohan's Theatre in New York City.
- Born:
  - Suraj N. Gupta, Indian-born U.S. theoretical physicist noted for his contributions to quantum field theory, including the Gupta–Bleuler quantization; in Punjab Province, British India (d. 2021)
  - Fazle Kaderi Mohammad Abdul Munim, Chief Justice of Bangladesh from 1982 to 1989; in Dhaka, Bengal Province, British India (d. 2001)
  - General Sawar Khan, Vice Chief of Staff of the Pakistan Army 1980 to 1984, and Governor of Punjab province, 1978-1980; in Rawalpindi District, Punjab Province, British India (d. 2023)
- Died: Reuben "Dummy" Stephenson, 55, the first deaf Major League Baseball player. Stephenson played as a center fielder for eight games for the Philadelphia Phillies in September 1892.

== December 2, 1924 (Tuesday) ==
- A devastating earthquake struck Java in the Dutch East Indies (now Indonesia), killing 727 people.
- Voldemārs Zāmuēls announced his resignation as Prime Minister of Latvia, along with his cabinet of ministers.
- The operetta The Student Prince, by Sigmund Romberg, premiered at Jolson's 59th Street Theatre on Broadway for the first of 608 performances.
- Born:
  - Alexander Haig, United States Secretary of State from 1981 to 1982, former Supreme Allied Commander Europe (SACEUR) from 1974 to 1979, and White House Chief of Staff from 1972 to 1974; in Bala Cynwyd, Pennsylvania (d. 2010)
  - Jack Davis; American cartoonist and illustrator; in Atlanta (d. 2016)
- Died:
  - Hugo von Seeliger, 75, German astronomer known for his discovery of the Seeliger Effect
  - Emmy Achté, 74, Finnish opera mezzo-soprano
  - Kazimieras Būga, 45, Lithuanian linguist

== December 3, 1924 (Wednesday) ==
- The third, and longest, expedition by the Compagnie générale transsaharienne (CGT) to find an effective automobile route across the Sahara Desert completed an 18-day, 2,200-mile (3,500 km) journey, reaching Savè (now in Benin) after having departed from Colomb-Béchar in Algeria on November 15. Led by CGT founder Gaston Gradis, with eleven other persons, the expedition featured three six-wheel, double-tired Renault automobiles.
- U.S. president Calvin Coolidge delivered his 2nd State of the Union message to the United States Congress. Unlike in 1923, Coolidge delivered a written address instead of giving a speech. The message stated that the present state of the Union "may be regarded with encouragement and satisfaction by every American."
- The US and British governments concluded an agreement respecting the rights of US citizens in British mandated Palestine.
- Born:
  - U.S. Army Major General Mary E. Clarke, the first woman to attain the rank of major general in the United States Army, known also for the longest U.S. Army career (36 years) served by a woman; in Rochester, New York (d. 2011)
  - F. Sionil José, Philippine novelist; in Rosales, Pangasinan (d. 2022)

== December 4, 1924 (Thursday) ==
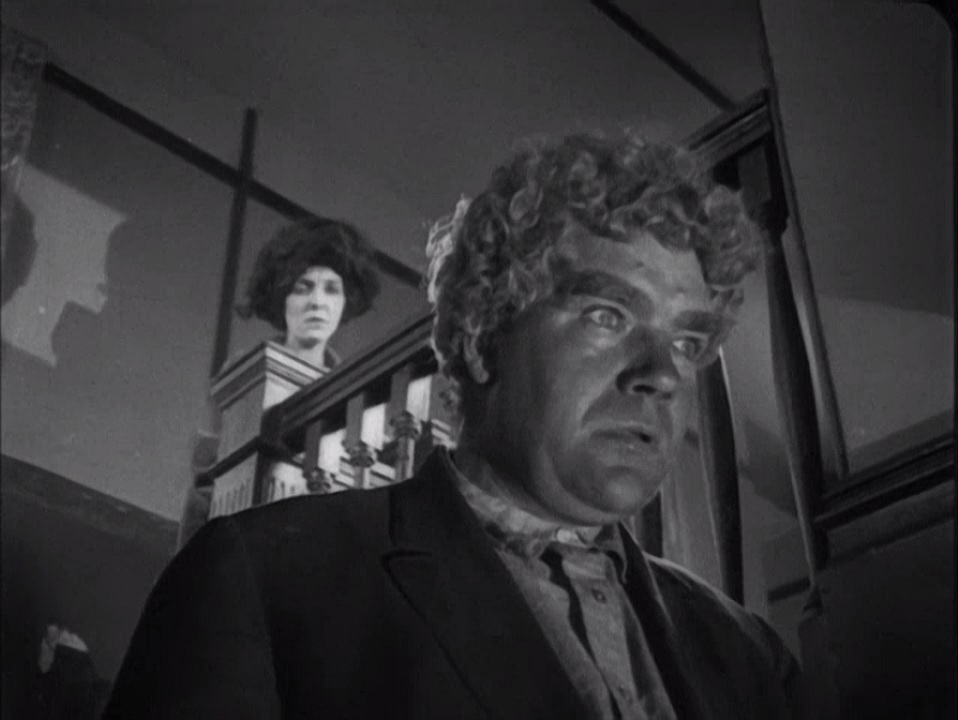
Pitts and Gowland in Greed

- The silent film Greed, written and directed by Erich von Stroheim, premiered at the Cosmopolitan Theatre in New York. The psychological thriller, starring Gibson Gowland and ZaSu Pitts, with Jean Hersholt, was edited to 22 reels and eventually to 10 reels (2 hours and 10 minutes) for general audiences. It would be described by later filmmakers as a major influence on their technique, and by many critics as one of the greatest films ever made.
- Portuguese swindler Alves dos Reis carried out one of the largest frauds in history against the Bank of Portugal, approaching the currency printer Waterlow and Sons of London with a letter of introduction from the Joh. Enschedé currency printing company of the Netherlands and arranging for the printing of 200,000 bank notes, each with a face value of 500 Portuguese escudos, with the same serial numbers as a previous Waterlow printing. The first notes were delivered in February by accomplices of Reis.
- The 85-foot (26 m) high Gateway of India monument, designed by architect George Wittet, was inaugurated in Bombay (now Mumbai) in British India in a ceremony by the Governor-General, the Earl of Reading.
- The ocean liner SS Belgenland departed from New York City with at least 350 passengers to begin a cruise around the world that would last for more than four months. Only 235 of the passengers remained aboard on the Belgenland for the entire cruise.
- The trial of confessed serial killer Fritz Haarmann began in Germany.
- Died: Cipriano Castro, 66, president of Venezuela from 1899 to 1908

== December 5, 1924 (Friday) ==
- The Battle of Mecca took place as Abdulaziz Ibn Saud, ruler of the Sultanate of Nejd, overwhelmed the outnumbered defenders of the Kingdom of Hejaz and forced Ali bin Hussein, King of Hejaz, to flee the city. The final rout completed the Saudi conquest of Hejaz and the union of Nejd and Hejaz as Saudi Arabia. After the battle, Ibn Saud entered Mecca in ihram clothing, making the umrah, one of the two forms of the Muslim pilgrimage to the Great Mosque of Mecca. The umrah differs from the hajj in that the umrah pilgrimage takes place outside of the month of Dhu al-Hijjah, and Saud made the trip on the 8th day of Jumada I.
- The State of Syria (Dawlat Sūriyā) was created within the Mandate for Syria and the Lebanon by Decree No. 2980, uniting the State of Aleppo and the State of Damascus under one common native assembly and administration.
- Fayzulla Xoʻjayev became the Chairman of the Revolutionary Committee of the Uzbek SSR, which had become a part of the Union of Soviet Socialist Republics. On February 17, he would become Chairman of the Council of People's Commissars.
- Benito Mussolini introduced a bill enforcing widespread press censorship.
- The first Woolworths Australia department store opened in downtown Sydney; the predecessor name was Woolworths Stupendous Bargain Basement.
- Born:
  - Robert Sobukwe, South African anti-apartheid revolutionary and the founder and first president of the Pan Africanist Congress, from 1959 to 1963; in Graaff-Reinet, Eastern Cape (d. 1978 from cancer)
  - David Schwendeman, American taxidermist for the American Museum of Natural History in New York City from 1959 to 1988; in Milltown, New Jersey (d. 2012)
  - John Keston, British-born American stage actor known for breaking long distance world records for his age group; in London (d. 2022)
  - Abram Ilyich Fet, Soviet Russian mathematician; in Odessa, Ukrainian SSR, Soviet Union (d. 2009)
- Died:
  - S. Subramania Iyer, 82, founder of the Indian Home Rule movement and co-founder of the Indian National Congress
  - Arnold Sommerling, 26, a leader of the Communist attempt to overthrow the Estonian government, was shot by police after resisting arrest.

== December 6, 1924 (Saturday) ==
- France rounded up over 300 communists in raids on their headquarters, including some 70 of foreign nationality that were to be deported. "There are too many foreign communists in France who forget their duty to the country that has given them asylum", Prime Minister Édouard Herriot told the Chamber of Deputies. "They are indulging in political demonstrations, and we will not tolerate it, we will not let them meddle in our political life. If we meet with resistance we will break it, and we will deport as many as necessary."
- Born:
  - Wally Cox, American comedian and actor; in Detroit (d. 1973)
  - George Pinker, British obstetrician and gynecologist for the British royal family; in Calcutta, British India (d. 2007)
- Died:
  - Geneva "Gene" Stratton-Porter, 61, American author, screenwriter and naturalist
  - Annie Moore, 60, Irish-born American known for becoming, on January 1, 1892, the first immigrant to pass inspection at the newly-opened Ellis Island customs facility.

== December 7, 1924 (Sunday) ==
- Voting was held in Germany for all 493 seats of the Reichstag, which had increased in size from 472 seats since the election held in May. The coalition government of Chancellor Wilhelm Marx, composed of ministers from his own Zentrum Party, the Deusche Volkspartei (DVP) and the Deutsche Demokratische Partei (DDP) as the opposition Sozialdemokratische Partei Deutschlands (SPD) increased its plurality by 31 seats.
- A post-season game was played between the two teams with the best records in the NFL, as the first-place Cleveland Bulldogs (7–1–1) lost to the Chicago Bears (6–1–4) in Chicago, 22 to 0, before a crowd of 18,000 people. The game was described the next day in newspapers as the NFL championship. However, the NFL rules at the time provided that the season ended on November 30 and made no provision for a post-season championship, so Cleveland was deemed the title winner with the best season record (.875 to Chicago's .857) and the contest was considered to be only an exhibition game.
- Born:
  - Mário Soares, president of Portugal from 1986 to 1996, and prime minister 1976 to 1978 and 1983 to 1985; in Lisbon (d. 2017)
  - Ernest Fleischmann, German-born American musician who served as executive director of the Los Angeles Philharmonic orchestra from 1969 to 1999; in Frankfurt am Main (d. 2010)
  - Bent Fabric (stage name for Bent Fabricus-Bjerre), pianist and composer, in Frederiksberg, Denmark (d. 2020)
  - Jovanka Broz (née Jovanka Budisavljević), wife of Yugoslavian president Josip Broz Tito throughout his entire presidency from 1952 to 1980; in Belgrade, SR Serbia, Yugoslavia (d. 2013)

== December 8, 1924 (Monday) ==
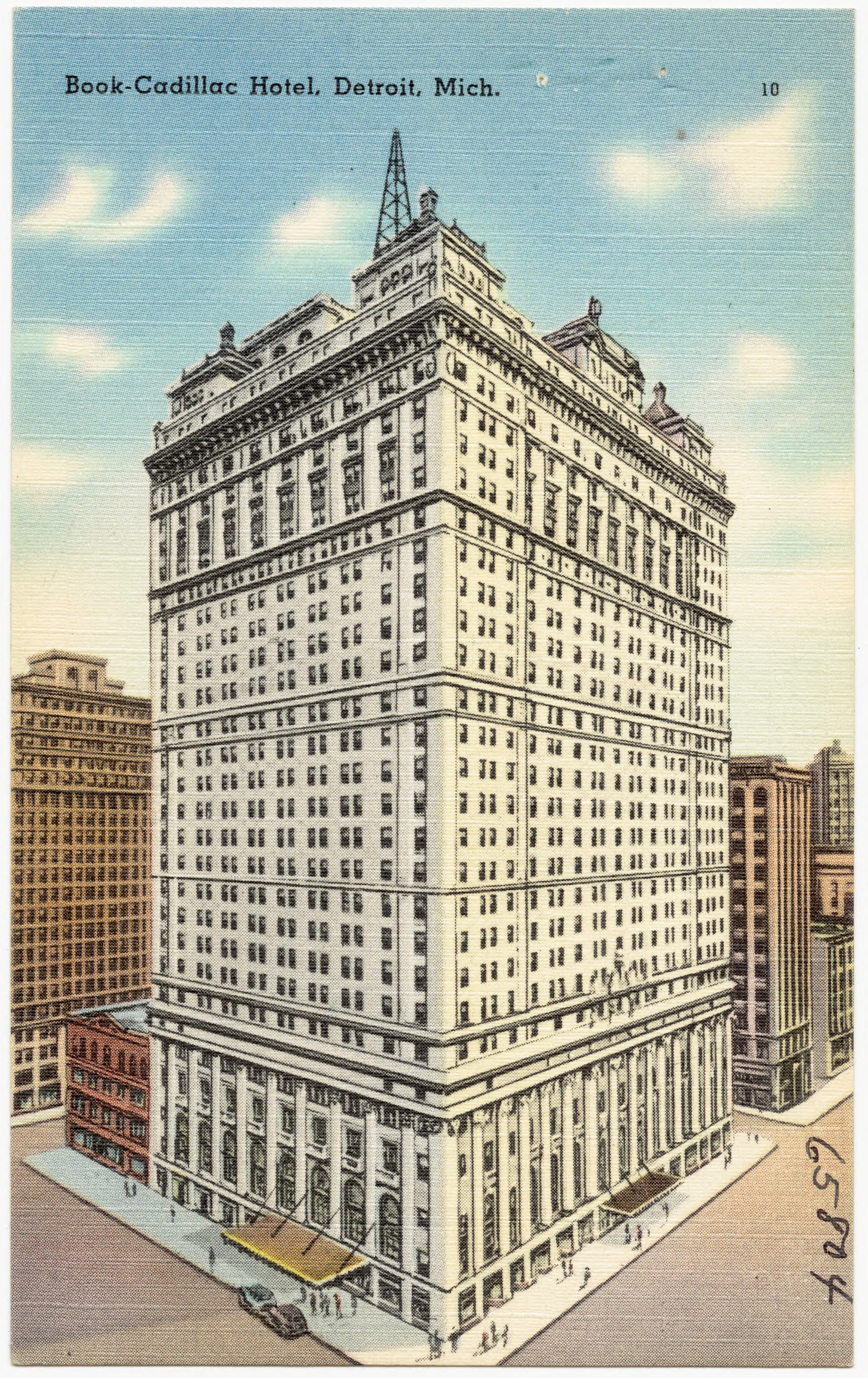
The Book-Cadillac Hotel

- The 31-story Book-Cadillac Hotel, at the time the tallest hotel in the world, opened in Detroit. J. Burgess Book, Frank Book and Herbert Book purchased the old Cadillac Hotel and closed it on June 26, 1923, then demolished it and had the new, 1,136-room luxury hotel built within less than a year and a half.
- The longest continuous rivalry in the National Hockey League, between the Boston Bruins and the Montreal Canadiens, began at Boston Arena, with a come-from-behind 4-3 win by Montreal over the Bruins. In their first 100 seasons, the teams met in the Stanley Cup finals seven times (1930, 1946, 1953, 1957, 1958, 1977 and 1978), with Montreal winning all seven finals.
- Born: María Esther Zuno, Mexican women's rights activist and the wife of President Luis Echeverría during his term of office from 1970 to 1976; in Guadalajara, Jalisco state. During her husband's presidency, she declined to call herself primera dama ("First Lady"), choosing the title compañera ("comrade") (d. 1999)
- Died: Xaver Scharwenka, 74, German-Polish pianist, composer and teacher

== December 9, 1924 (Tuesday) ==
- A new session of British parliament was opened by George V and Queen Mary. The King's speech included a plan to enlarge the naval base at Singapore.
- Born: Manlio Sgalambro, philosopher and writer, in Lentini, Italy (d. 2014)

== December 10, 1924 (Wednesday) ==
- The 1924 Nobel Prizes were awarded. The honorees were Manne Siegbahn of Sweden for Physics, Willem Einthoven of the Netherlands (Medicine), and Władysław Reymont of Poland (Literature). No Prize was awarded for Chemistry or Peace this year.
- The Society for Human Rights (SHR), the first gay rights organization in the United States, was founded in Chicago by Henry Gerber. On December 24, 1924, the U.S. state of Illinois granted the SHR a charter to operate as a non-profit corporation, which listed its mission as one "to promote and protect the interests of people who by reasons of mental and physical abnormalities are abused and hindered in the legal pursuit of happiness which is guaranteed them by the Declaration of Independence and to combat the public prejudices against them by dissemination of factors according to modern science among intellectuals of mature age." The SHR lasted only a few months before the arrest of Gerber and the Society's other members in 1925.
- Near the village of Boliden in Sweden, the first gold from what would become the largest and richest gold mine in Europe, was discovered by prospectors led by Oscar Falkman, founder of Boliden AB. Mining would continue for more than 50 years before the exhaustion of the gold by 1967.
- Died: August Belmont, Jr., 71, American financier who financed the Interborough Rapid Transit Company that constructed and operated the original New York City Subway, as well as creating the Belmont Park thoroughbred horse racing venue in the New York suburb of Elmont, New York.

== December 11, 1924 (Thursday) ==
- James B. Duke, founder of the American Tobacco Company and Duke Power Company, a philanthropist who was one of the wealthiest men in the U.S., gave $40,000,000 to The Duke Endowment, a trust fund he had created. The Duke Fund was directed to support four colleges, as well as multiple non-profit hospitals, children's homes and rural United Methodist churches in North Carolina and South Carolina. The largest share of the gift (40% or $12,800,000) went to Trinity College in Durham, North Carolina, on the condition that the institution rename itself in honor of James Duke's father, the late Washington Duke, and Trinity College changed its name to Duke University upon accepting the endowment. Shares of 5% of the endowment were given to Davidson College and Furman University, while 4% was given to the historically black Johnson C. Smith University. Another $67,000,000 was provided to the endowment under Duke's will upon his death on October 10, 1925.
- The absolute world record for speed, 278.48 miles per hour (448.17 km/h), was set by the Bernard SIMB V.2 airplane, designed by French aviator Jean Hubert and piloted by Florentin Bonnet.
- Captain Joaquín Loriga of the Spanish Army demonstrated the flight capabilities of the autogyro invented by fellow Spaniard Juan de la Cierva, piloting the aircraft a distance of 7.4 miles (11.9 km) from Cuatro Vientos airfield (in Madrid) to the Army's Getafe Air Base, in a flight that lasted 8 minutes and 12 seconds. Two days earlier, Loriga had set the record of 200 yards (180 m) in his first practice run.
- Born:
  - Felix "Doc" Blanchard, American college football player who won the Heisman Trophy, the Maxwell Award and the James E. Sullivan Award in 1945, and later passed up a professional football career in order to serve a military career in the United States Air Force; in McColl, South Carolina (d. 2009)
  - Hal Brown, American baseball player; in Greensboro, North Carolina (d. 2015)

== December 12, 1924 (Friday) ==
- The Central Executive Committee of the USSR issued a decree prohibiting the possession of almost all firearms, with the exception of hunting rifles. The decree, titled "On the procedure of production, trade, storage, use, keeping and carrying firearms, firearm ammunition, explosive projectiles and explosives", outlawed personal possession of handguns and rifles other than smoothbore shotguns, and illegal gun possession was severely punished.
- The first issue of the weekly Saudi Arabian newspaper Umm Al-Qura was published. Based in Mecca, Umm Al-Qura is the official newspaper of the Saudi government.
- Addressing American correspondents at the League of Nations, French politician Aristide Briand said that American entry into the League was essential to ensure world peace.
- Born:
  - Ed Koch, mayor of New York City from 1978 to 1989; in the Bronx, New York (d. 2013)
  - Reinaldo "Ray" Cordeiro, Hong Kong radio disk jockey known as "Uncle Ray" and host for 51 years of the English-language show All the Way with Ray from 1970 to 2021; in Wan Chai, Hong Kong (d. 2023)
  - Kantilal Rathod, Indian filmmaker in Gujarat and Hindi cinema, known for Kanku; in Raipur, Central Provinces and Berar (now Chhattisgarh state), British India (d. 1988)
  - Jorge Gallardo, Costa Rican painter; in San Jose (d. 2002)

== December 13, 1924 (Saturday) ==
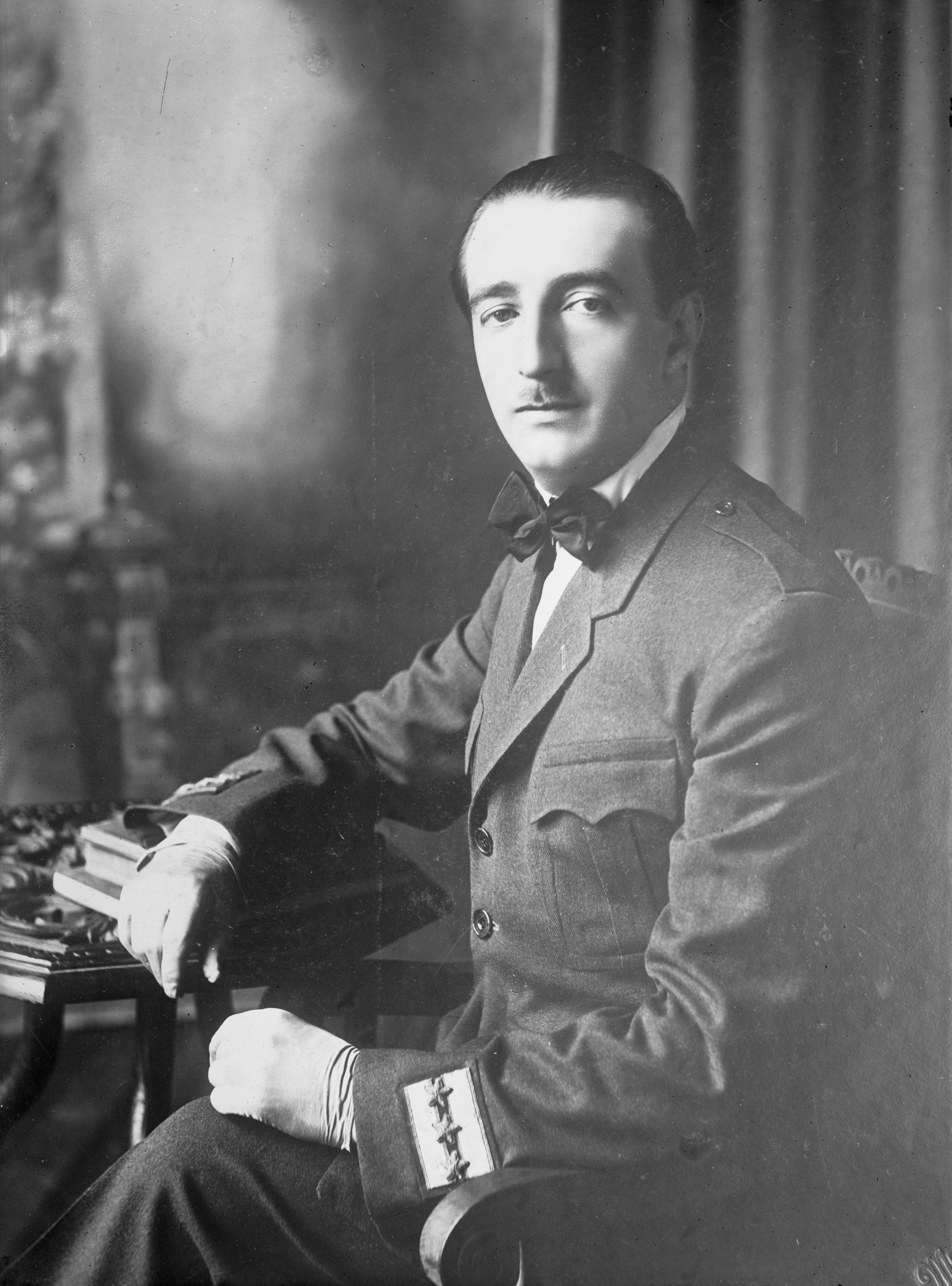
Ahmet Zogu, later King Zog the First

- Former Albanian Prime Minister Ahmet Zogu, who had been driven into exile in June, led an invasion of Albania with guerrillas backed by Yugoslavia, and marched toward the capital, Tirana, in order to remove Prime Minister Fan Noli from office.
- Born:
  - Krishna Prasad Bhattarai, Prime Minister of Nepal 1990-1991 and 1999-2000; in Kathmandu (d. 2011)
  - Rabbi Michael A. Robinson, American civil rights activist and rabbi within the Reform Jewish denomination; in Asheville, North Carolina (d. 2006)
  - Nora Houfová, Austrian stage and film actress; in Vienna (d. 2024)
  - Robert Coogan, American child actor and younger brother of Jackie Coogan; in Glendale, California (d. 1978)

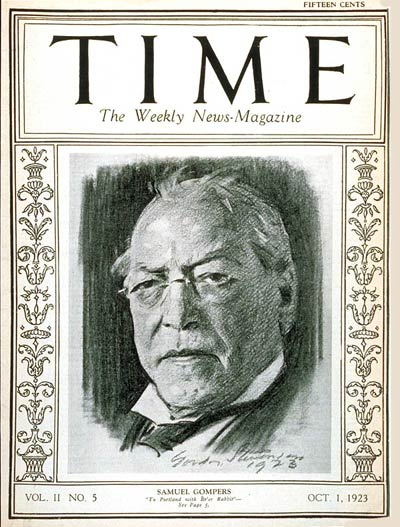
Gompers

- Died: Samuel Gompers, 74, President of the American Federation of Labor (AFL, now part of the AFL-CIO) since 1895, and the founder of the organization in 1886, died in The St. Anthony Hotel in San Antonio, Texas, seven days after becoming ill in Mexico City.

== December 14, 1924 (Sunday) ==
- The Henry Kimball Hadley dramatic opera A Night in Old Paris premiered at the Metropolitan Opera House in New York City.
- The town of Fairfield, Montana set a weather record for greatest drop of temperature in a 12-hour period, from 63 °F (17.2 °C) at noon to −21 °F (−29.4 °C) at midnight.
- Born: Raj Kapoor, Indian film actor and filmmaker, Bollywood star, known for the successful 1949 films Ardaz and Barsaat; in Kapoor Haveli, Peshawar (d. 1988)

== December 15, 1924 (Monday) ==
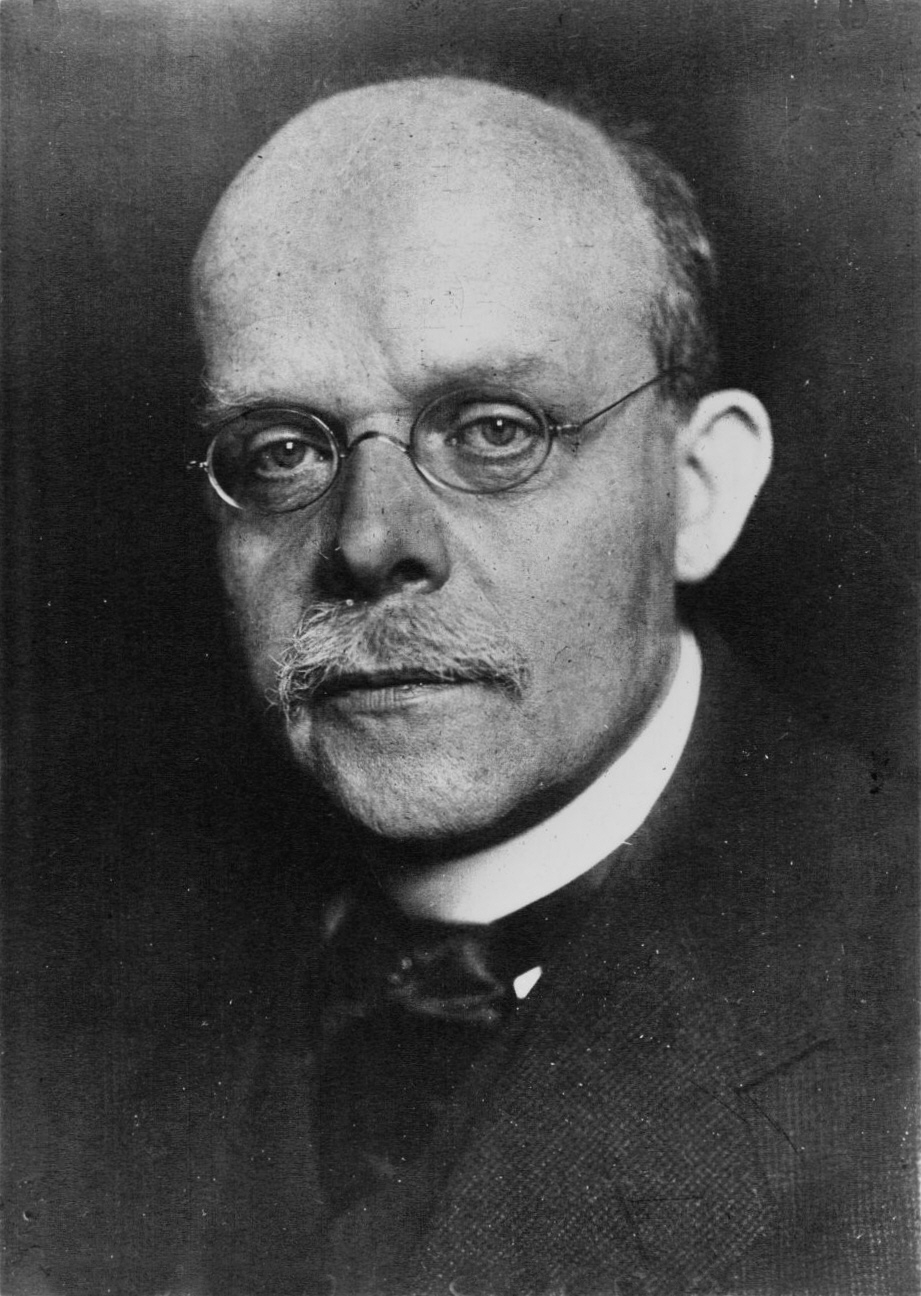
Chancellor Marx

- German Chancellor Wilhelm Marx announced that he and his cabinet of ministers were resigning after the coalition's recent loss in the December 7 elections. The cabinet remained in office in a caretaker government until Finance Minister Hans Luther was able to form a new government on January 15.
- The first launch, docking and recovery of an aircraft in mid-air was performed when a U.S. Army pilot flew a Sperry Messenger biplane over a TC-3 Army dirigible and used a "skyhook" to link to the airship and bring it under control.
- Samuel Smith, a 15-year-old African-American arrested for shooting and wounding a white grocer, was seized from his hospital room in Nashville, Tennessee, by a group of masked and armed vigilantes shortly after midnight, driven to Nolensville and hanged from a tree near the grocer's home. Onlookers then shot the hanging body multiple times. Nashville's Mayor Hilary Howse denounced the lynching and the Nashville Chamber of Commerce offered a $5,000 reward for the arrest and conviction of the lynchers, but nobody was ever charged with the crime.
- In a letter to British Prime Minister Stanley Baldwin, Winston Churchill opined that Singapore's defences did not need to be completed for another fifteen to twenty years, writing, "I do not believe there is the slightest chance of war with Japan in our lifetime. Japan is at the other end of the world. She cannot menace our vital security in any way."
- Born:
  - Nek Chand Saini, Indian artist known for the design and construction of the Rock Garden of Chandigarh, opened in 1988; in Barian Kalan, Shakargarh, Punjab Province, British India (now Punjab province in Pakistan) (d. 2015)
  - Noel Hush, Australian chemist known for his discovery of the role of adiabatic electron transfer between molecules in the process of oxidation; in Sydney (d. 2019)
  - Viter Juste, Haitian-born American community leader who organized the residents of the "Little Haiti" community (now numbering 30,000) in Miami; on Gonâve Island (d. 2012)
- Died: Friedrich Trendelenburg, 80, German surgeon and innovator known for the Trendelenburg operation for the treatment of varicose veins, as well as various diagnostic procedures, including the Brodie–Trendelenburg percussion test for finding nonfunctioning valves in veins, Trendelenburg's test for hip mobility, and Trendelenburg's sign identifying a congenital dislocation of the hip.

== December 16, 1924 (Tuesday) ==
- The Spanish confiscation (Desamortización española) law, authorizing the government of Spain to expropriate land and personal property received by the Roman Catholic Church and various religious orders from wills and grants, was repealed after being promulgated in 1766.
- The Supreme Court of Hungary confiscated the property of former president Mihály Károlyi for high treason. Károlyi was convicted of negotiating with Italy in 1915 to keep the Italians out of the war in exchange for Austrian territory, and for allowing a communist revolution to happen in 1919 by deserting his position.
- Born:
  - Nissim Ezekiel, Indian poet and playwright; in Bombay (now Mumbai) (d. 2004)
  - Loudon Wainwright Jr., American writer and editor for Life magazine; in New York City (d. 1988)

== December 17, 1924 (Wednesday) ==
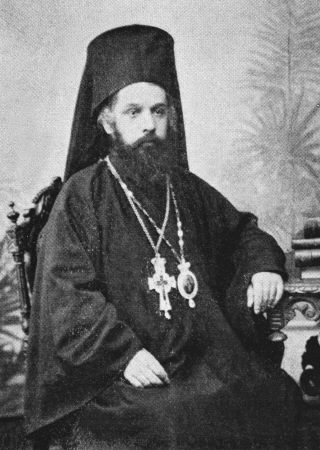
Patriarch Constantine VI

- Constantine VI, the Metropolitan of Derkoi, was elected by his fellow clergy as the new Ecumenical Patriarch of Constantinople, the leader of the Eastern Orthodox Church, and enthroned the same day. The title had been vacant since the November 17 death of Patriarch Gregory VII.
- Prempeh I, the exiled ceremonial king of the Ashanti Empire, was allowed to return to Ghana (at the time, the British Gold Coast colony in West Africa) after being relocated to the Seychelles in 1896. The decision was approved by the British cabinet at the recommendation of the Secretary of State for the Colonies, Leo Amery, three years after the death of the leader of the War of the Golden Stool, Queen Mother Yaa Asantewaa.
- The owners of seven of the eight teams in baseball's American League presented a resolution to Major League Baseball Commissioner Kenesaw Mountain Landis saying that the "misconduct" of League president Ban Johnson would cease, "or his immediate removal from office will follow." The resolution also declared "that legislation will be adopted that will limit his activities to the internal affairs of the American league." Phil Ball of the St. Louis Browns was the only team owner who did not sign the resolution. The move came after Johnson's continued criticism of Landis, but Johnson promised to remain on his best behavior.
- Born:
  - Robin Lovejoy, Fijian-born Australian stage and television director; in Labasa (d. 1985)
  - Admiral Yohai Ben-Nun, commander of the Israeli Navy from 1960 to 1966, later the Director General of Oceanographic and Limnological Research Ltd.; in Haifa, Mandatory Palestine (d. 1994)
  - Selene Mahri (stage name for Solveig Eklund), Finnish-born fashion model and spokesperson for the WAVES branch of the U.S. Naval Reserve during World War II (d. 2020)

== December 18, 1924 (Thursday) ==
- Pope Pius XI made his first statement against communism after an abandoned pontifical relief mission returned from Russia. He said the Vatican would continue to make efforts to help needy Russians, but "nobody certainly can have thought by our efforts on behalf of the Russian people we intended in any way to lend our support to a system of government which we are so far from approving."
- Born: Ilya Darevsky, Soviet Russian zoologist and herpetologist known for describing 34 species of amphibians and reptiles, for whom the genus Darevskia, comprising 35 species of Caucasian rock lizards, is named; in Kiev, Ukrainian SSR (d. 2009)
- Died: Julius Kahn, 63, German-born U.S. Representative for California since 1905, and the longest serving Jewish member of Congress up to that time, died of a cerebral hemorrhage and complications of diabetes.

== December 19, 1924 (Friday) ==
- Hugo Celmiņš formed a government as the new Prime Minister of Latvia following the resignation of Voldemārs Zāmuēls.
- German serial killer Fritz Haarmann was sentenced to death for murdering twenty-four young men.
- Born:
  - Doug Harvey, Canadian ice hockey player who won the Norris Memorial Trophy seven times as the NHL's best defenceman, and was later inducted into the Hockey Hall of Fame; in Montreal (d. 1989)
  - Cicely Tyson, African-American stage, film and television actress, winner of three Emmy Awards (including for The Autobiography of Miss Jane Pittman), a Tony Award (for The Trip to Bountiful) and a Screen Actors Guild Award; in the Bronx, New York City (d. 2021)

== December 20, 1924 (Saturday) ==
- Adolf Hitler was released from Landsberg Prison as part of a general amnesty for political prisoners, after having served 13 months of a five-year prison sentence. He returned to his small Munich apartment where his friends threw him a party.
- By royal decree of King Alfonso XIII and legislation passed by the government of Prime Minister Miguel Primo de Rivera, Spanish law was amended to allow descendants of the Sephardi Jews, expelled from Spain in 1492, to attain Spanish nationality after two years of residence.
- The longest running children's broadcast program, Lørdagsbarnetimen, made its debut, playing on Norway's Kringkastningsselskapet A/S radio network. It would continue every Saturday afternoon for more than 85 years, with a final show on September 11, 2010.
- Benito Mussolini presented legislation repealing the much-criticized Acerbo Law, which had cemented control by the Fascist Party of parliament by providing that the party which got the largest share of votes (25% or more) would be guaranteed two-thirds of the seats in parliament, with the other one-third to be apportioned to the other parties.
- With Austria's currency, the krone (crown), having declined in value because of inflation, Austria's parliament enacted the Schillingrechnungsgesetz, creating the Austrian schilling, worth 10,000 kronen, with exchange to take place up until March 1.
- Born:
  - Errol John, Trinidanian-born actor and playwright; in Port of Spain (d. 1988)
  - Swaran Lata, Pakistani film actress in Indian and Pakistani cinema; in Rawalpindi, Punjab Province, British India (d. 2008)
  - Charlie Callas, American comedian, TV and film actor; in Brooklyn as Charles Callias (d. 2011)

== December 21, 1924 (Sunday) ==
- The string of murders by German serial killer and cannibal Karl Denke came to an end when a homeless drifter, Vincenz Olivier, narrowly escaped being killed after being lured into Denke's home and alerted police in Münsterberg (now Ziębice in Poland). Denke hanged himself in his jail cell the next day, and police searched his house, finding a ledger with the names of 30 victims (and a 31st entry for Olivier) and a large number of body parts deemed to have come from 42 or more people.
- In the Republic of China, the "New National Pronunciation", a standardized pronunciation for the character sounds of the Chinese language, was set by delegates of a Commission established for the purpose of reforming the "Guóyīn Zìdiǎn". The delegates recommended the usage of Beijing, and later incorporated the new standard in 1932 in the "Guóyīn Chángyòng Zìhuì" (國音常用字匯, "Vocabulary of National Pronunciation for Everyday Use").
- Roughly 100 people were injured in rioting between communists and police in Berlin as a group of 50,000 German communists turned into a crushing mob when they gathered to greet Erich Mühsam upon his release from prison in the same general amnesty that freed Hitler.
- Born: Dankwart Rustow, German-born professor of political science and sociology, known for his research on democratization; in Berlin (d. 1996)
- Died: Francesco Negri, 83, Italian photographer known for his development of the telephoto lens and improvements in photomicroscopy

== December 22, 1924 (Monday) ==
- An interallied military committee, headed by Ferdinand Foch, announced that French and Belgian troops would not withdraw from the Cologne area of Germany on January 10, 1925, as specified in the Treaty of Versailles, because Germany had not fulfilled its disarmament provisions. Angry articles in the German press accused the Allies of breaking the Dawes Pact.
- The comet 43P/Wolf–Harrington was discovered by German astronomer Max Wolf from the Heidelberg observatory.
- The first college of agriculture in Burma (now Myanmar), the Agricultural College and Research Institute of Mandalay, was established. After being renamed the Institute of Agriculture in 1964, it would be moved 180 miles (290 km) southward to Yezin in 1973 and renamed Yezin Agricultural University.
- Born:
  - Jack Greenberg, American civil rights attorney; in Brooklyn, New York City (d. 2016)
  - Kanaklata Barua, Indian independence activist and martyr, known for her leadership of the All India Students' Federation; in Borangabari village, Eastern Bengal and Assam province, British India (killed, 1942)

== December 23, 1924 (Tuesday) ==
- German president Friedrich Ebert lost a libel trial in Magdeburg. Newspaper editor Erwin Rothart was sentenced to three months in prison for insulting the president, but his accusation that Ebert had betrayed the country for leading a strike in 1918 was ruled as proven.
- Albanian Prime Minister Fan Noli and his ministers fled Tirana as rebel forces led by the deposed leader Ahmet Zogu approached the city.
- The F. W. Murnau-directed film The Last Laugh premiered at the Ufa-Palast am Zoo in Berlin.
- The Nicolae Bretan opera Golem was first performed at the Hungarian Theater in Cluj, Romania.
- Born:
  - Bob Kurland, American college and AAU basketball player, inductee to the Naismith Memorial Basketball Hall of Fame, credited as the first person to dunk in a college basketball game; in St. Louis, Missouri (d. 2013)
  - Matthäus Hetzenauer, Austrian sniper for Nazi Germany during World War II, with 345 confirmed kills against Soviet troops; in Brixen im Thale (d. 2004)
  - Richard E. Bush, U.S. Marine and Medal of Honor recipient who survived throwing himself on an enemy grenade during the Battle of Okinawa during World War II; in Glasgow, Kentucky (d. 2004)
  - E. O. Kane, American physicist known for developing the Kane model of the structure of energy bands of semiconductors; in Kane, Pennsylvania (d. 2006)
- Died: Christopher Whall, 75, British stained-glass artist

== December 24, 1924 (Wednesday) ==
- A fire killed 36 people in a one-room school house at Babbs Switch, Oklahoma, where over 200 people were attending a party on Christmas Eve. Candles near a dry Christmas tree spread the blaze after a student handing out presents accidentally brushed a wrapped gift against a candle flame.
- All eight people aboard an Imperial Airways de Havilland DH.34 airliner— seven of them passengers— were killed while traveling between London and Paris. In Britain's deadliest air disaster up to that time, Imperial airplane G-EBBX plummeted seconds after taking off from Croydon Airport toward Le Bourget Airport.
- Pope Pius XI opened the holy door at St. Peter's Basilica to begin the Jubilee Year of 1925.
- Albania, nominally a principality since becoming independent in 1912, but never able to find a monarch, was declared a republic as Ahmet Zogu entered Tirana without resistance. Zogu, a former Prime Minister, reclaimed leadership of the country and completed the overthrow of Fan Noli's government.
- Egypt's 215-member House of Representatives, the Maglis El Nowwab, was dissolved by King Fuad I at the request of Prime Minister Ahmed Zeiwar Pasha, and new elections were set for March 23.
- Born:
  - Nour Al Hoda, Turkish-born Lebanese actress and singer; in Istanbul (d. 1998)
  - Mohammed Rafi, Indian playback singer; in Kotla Sultan Singh, Punjab Province, British India (d. 1980)
  - Aura Ambache Herzog, Egyptian-born wife of Israel's President Chaim Herzog and mother of Israeli President Isaac Herzog; First Lady of Israel from 1983 to 1993; in Ismailia (d. 2022)
- Died: David Stewart, 34, British flying ace and the pilot in the fatal Imperial Airways airplane crash

== December 25, 1924 (Thursday) ==
- Patriarch Tikhon of Moscow, leader of the Russian Orthodox Church within the Soviet Union, designated three different persons as potential successors, identifying Metropolitan Kirill Smirnov of Kazan, Metropolitan Agathangel Preobrazhensky of Yaroslavl and Metropolitan Peter Polyansky of Krutitsy. With Smirnov and Preobrazhensky imprisoned at the time of Tikhon's death on April 7, Polyansky would be selected by the clerics of the church as Peter of Krutitsy, Patriarch of Moscow and All Russia.
- A post-season college football bowl game known as the Los Angeles Christmas Festival was played in the Los Angeles Memorial Coliseum. The USC Trojans defeated the Missouri Tigers, 20–7.
- The Broadway Theatre opened in midtown-Manhattan, New York City.
- Born:
  - Moktar Ould Daddah, the first president of Mauritania (from 1960 to 1978); in Boutilimit, French West Africa (d. 2003)
  - Atal Bihari Vajpayee, 10th Prime Minister of India from 1998 to 2004; in Gwalior, Gwalior State (now in Madhya Pradesh state), British India (d. 2018)
  - Rod Serling, screenwriter, playwright, television producer and narrator known for The Twilight Zone; in Syracuse, New York (d. 1975)

== December 26, 1924 (Friday) ==
- Soviet ambassador Leonid Krassin said that Russia would not pay any outstanding debts accrued in the days of the Tsar.
- Judy Garland made her show business debut at the age of 2 1/2, singing "Jingle Bells" at her parents' theater in Grand Rapids, Minnesota.
- Died: William Emerson, 81, British architect

== December 27, 1924 (Saturday) ==
- An explosion killed 94 people in Japan, and injured more than 300, as 600 cases of dynamite were being transferred from the cargo ship Shoho Maru to a freight car, at the Temiya railway station at Otaru on the island of Hokkaido. The official figures came from a Japanese government report.
- Three months after the last U.S. troops left the Dominican Republic and allowed the nation to govern itself independently, Dominican representatives signed an agreement allowing the U.S. to control the Republic's customs revenues, which would continue until 1941.
- An editorial written by the estranged Fascist politician Cesare Rossi ran in Giovanni Amendola's newspaper Il Mondo, simultaneously published in other opposition papers. In it, Rossi claimed that Benito Mussolini had directly ordered the Fascists to carry out several crimes.

== December 28, 1924 (Sunday) ==
- Three days of voting began in Honduras for President and for the 47 seats of the Congreso Nacional. The Liberal Party boycotted the election, and Miguel Paz Barahona of the conservative National Party was elected president virtually unopposed, and the National Party won all but one of the seats in Congress.
- Near the village of Valchitran in Bulgaria, two brothers discovered gold and silver artifacts that had been buried by a group of the ancient Thracians around 1300 BC, including a bowl made of 10 pounds (4.5 kg) of gold.
- The Linguistic Society of America was founded.
- With Franco-German tensions high over the issue of the occupation of Cologne, a sensational report was published in Paris claiming that German scientists had secretly developed a new and devastating poison gas that could annihilate a whole city in a matter of hours.
- Born:
  - Girma Wolde-Giorgis, President of Ethiopia from 2001 to 2013; in Addis Ababa (d. 2018)
  - Sidney Topol, American entrepreneur, chairman of Scientific Atlanta and developer of the satellite signal receiver dish; in Boston (d. 2022)
  - Willy Albimoor, Belgian composer; in Wevelgem, West Flanders (d. 2004)
- Died: Albert Koebele, 71, German entomologist who developed methods of biological control of insect pests and invasive plant species

== December 29, 1924 (Monday) ==
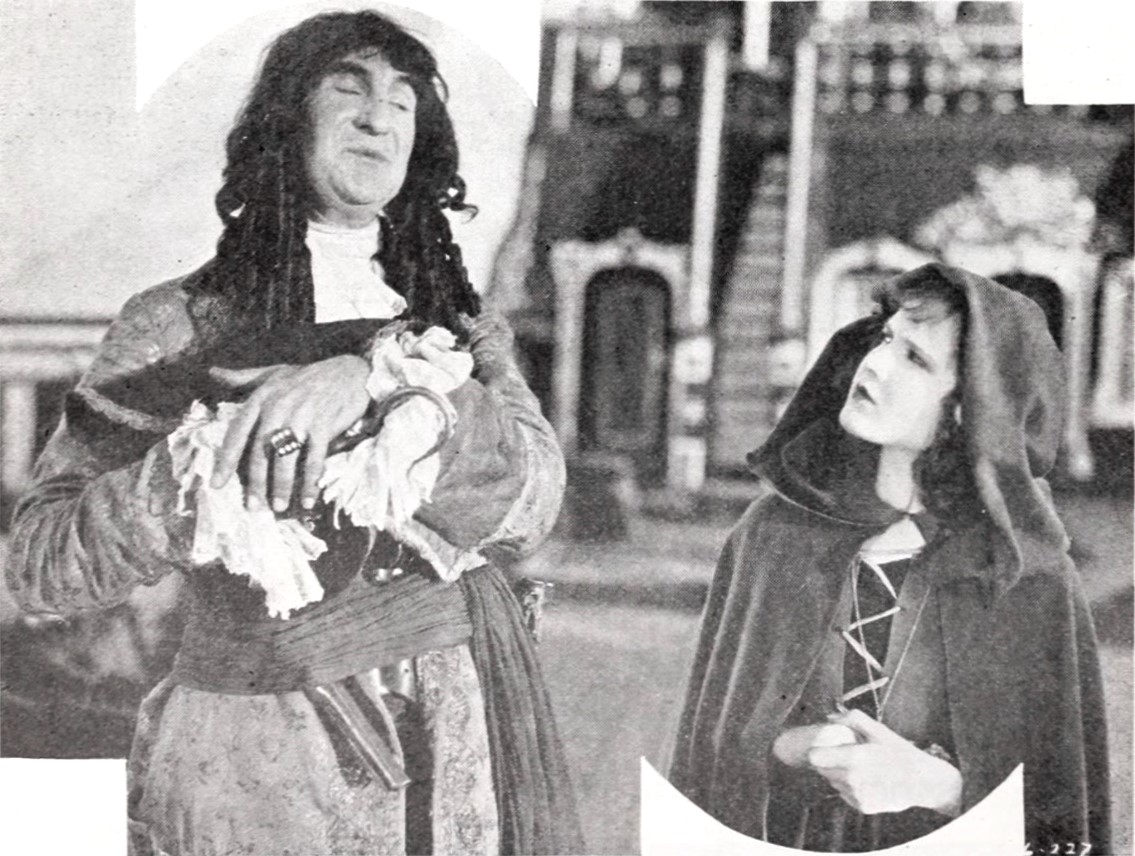
Captain Hook (Ernest Torrence) and Peter Pan (Betty Bronson)

- The adventure film Peter Pan, directed by Herbert Brenon and starring Betty Bronson in the title role, was released by Paramount Pictures (at the time, Famous Players–Lasky). The film was an adaptation of the J. M. Barrie play Peter Pan, or, the Boy Who Wouldn't Grow Up, which had premiered almost exactly 20 years earlier (on December 27, 1904) and which Barrie novelized in 1911 in the book Peter and Wendy. After originally being considered lost, the film footage would be rediscovered at the Eastman School of Music in the 1950s and restored. In 2000, the Library of Congress would select the film for preservation in the National Film Registry.
- Kid McCoy was found guilty of manslaughter in the August 12 death of his live-in mistress.
- Born: Kim Song-ae, wife of North Korean Supreme Leader Kim Il Sung from their marriage in 1952 to 1994, Chair of the Korean Democratic Women's League and a representative in the Supreme People's Assembly (d. 2014)
- Died:
  - Carl Spitteler, 79, Swiss writer and Nobel Prize laureate
  - Luigi Bottazzo, 79, blind Italian organist and composer

== December 30, 1924 (Tuesday) ==
- Benito Mussolini called an unexpected cabinet meeting and requested a show of support from all present, which he received from a majority. The two Liberal ministers in Mussolini's cabinet were convinced to withdraw their resignations. The meeting prompted other members of the Fascist party to confront Mussolini the next day in his office.
- German Foreign Minister Gustav Stresemann told international media that peace in Europe and fulfillment of the Dawes Plan were in danger unless a compromise was reached on the Cologne evacuation issue.
- Died: Kate Elinore, 47, American vaudeville entertainer

== December 31, 1924 (Wednesday) ==
- Thirty-three Blackshirt consuls, headed by Enzo Galbiati, arrived unannounced in Benito Mussolini's office, demanding that he crush the opposition or they would do so without him.
- Italian police were ordered to search the houses of prominent opposition leaders over allegations that enemies of the government had stockpiled vast stores of arms. Issues of opposition newspapers in several Italian cities were seized, with Florence becoming especially violent as thousands of Blackshirts converged on the city and ransacked several buildings, including the printing plant of an opposition newspaper which was set on fire.
- Julius Schaub, the chief adviser to Adolf Hitler, was released from Landsberg Prison, where he had been incarcerated with Hitler for participating in the 1923 attempt to overthrow the government of Munich.
- Three of four brothers in the Barmat family of merchants were arrested as the industrial corruption scandal known as the Barmat scandal broke in Germany. One report claimed that President Friedrich Ebert's son "Fritz" was connected to the scandal.
- Born:
  - Frank J. Kelley, U.S. politician, Attorney General of Michigan from 1961 to 1999, nicknamed "The Eternal General"; in Detroit (d. 2021)
  - Taylor Mead, writer, actor and performer, in Grosse Pointe, Michigan (d. 2013)
- Died:
  - George Winthrop Fairchild, 70, Chairman of the Board since 1915 of IBM, formerly the Computing-Tabulating-Recording Company, and U.S. Representative for New York, 1907 to 1919
  - Sir Samuel William Knaggs, 68, British civil servant
