= Ujka =

Ujka is a surname, found in various countries including Austria, the United States, and Slovakia. In the United States, the Ujka family was primarily found in Missouri in the early 20th century.

Notable people with the surname include:

- Nora Houfová (birth name Eleonore Ujka; 1924–2024), Austrian actress
- Serxho Ujka (born 1998), Albanian footballer
