= January 1925 =

Month of 1925

<<	January 1925					>>
Su	Mo	Tu	We	Th	Fr	Sa
				1	2	3
4	5	6	7	8	9	10
11	12	13	14	15	16	17
18	19	20	21	22	23	24
25	26	27	28	29	30	31

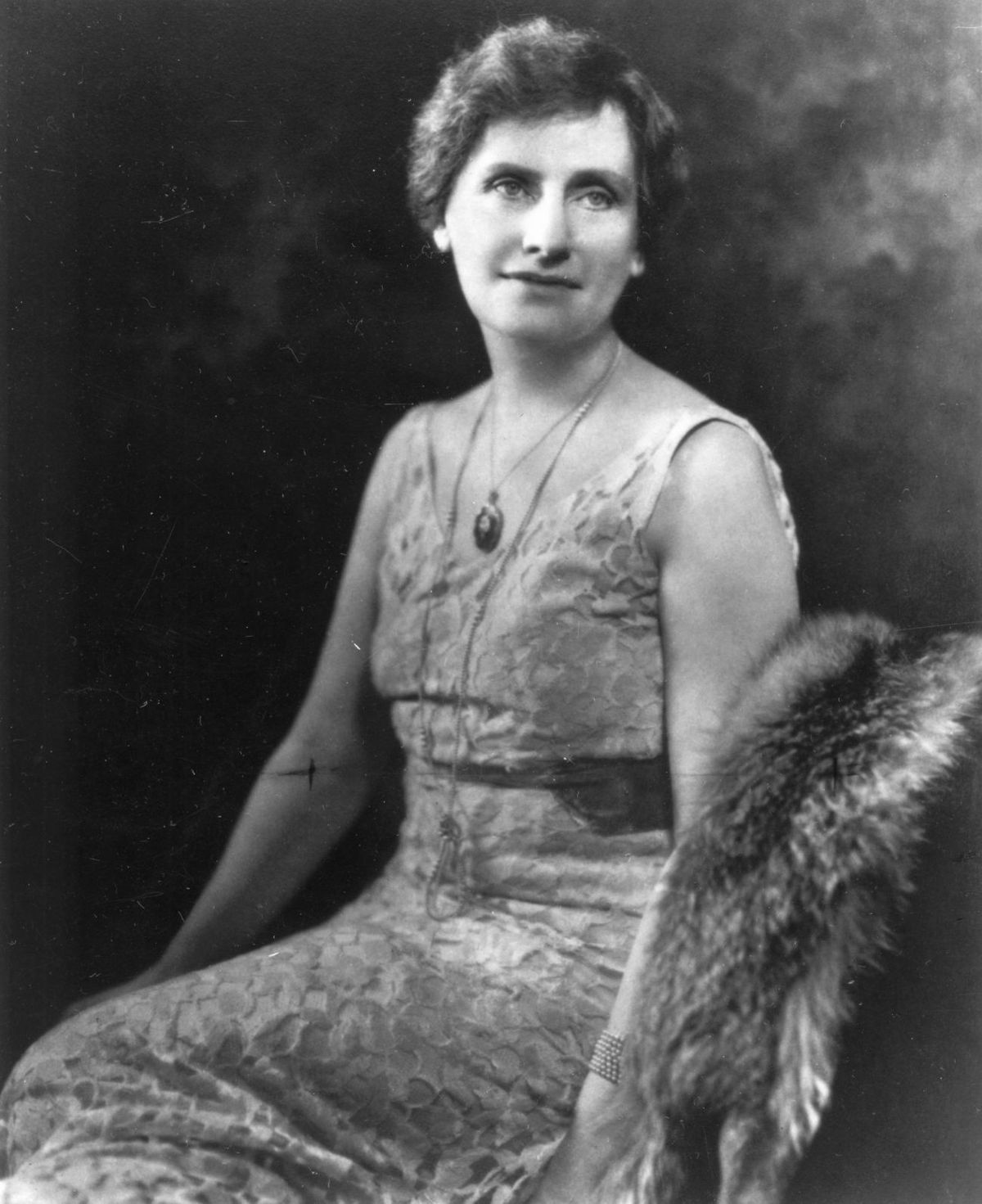
January 5, 1925: Nellie Tayloe Ross of Wyoming is sworn in as the first woman Governor of a U.S. state.

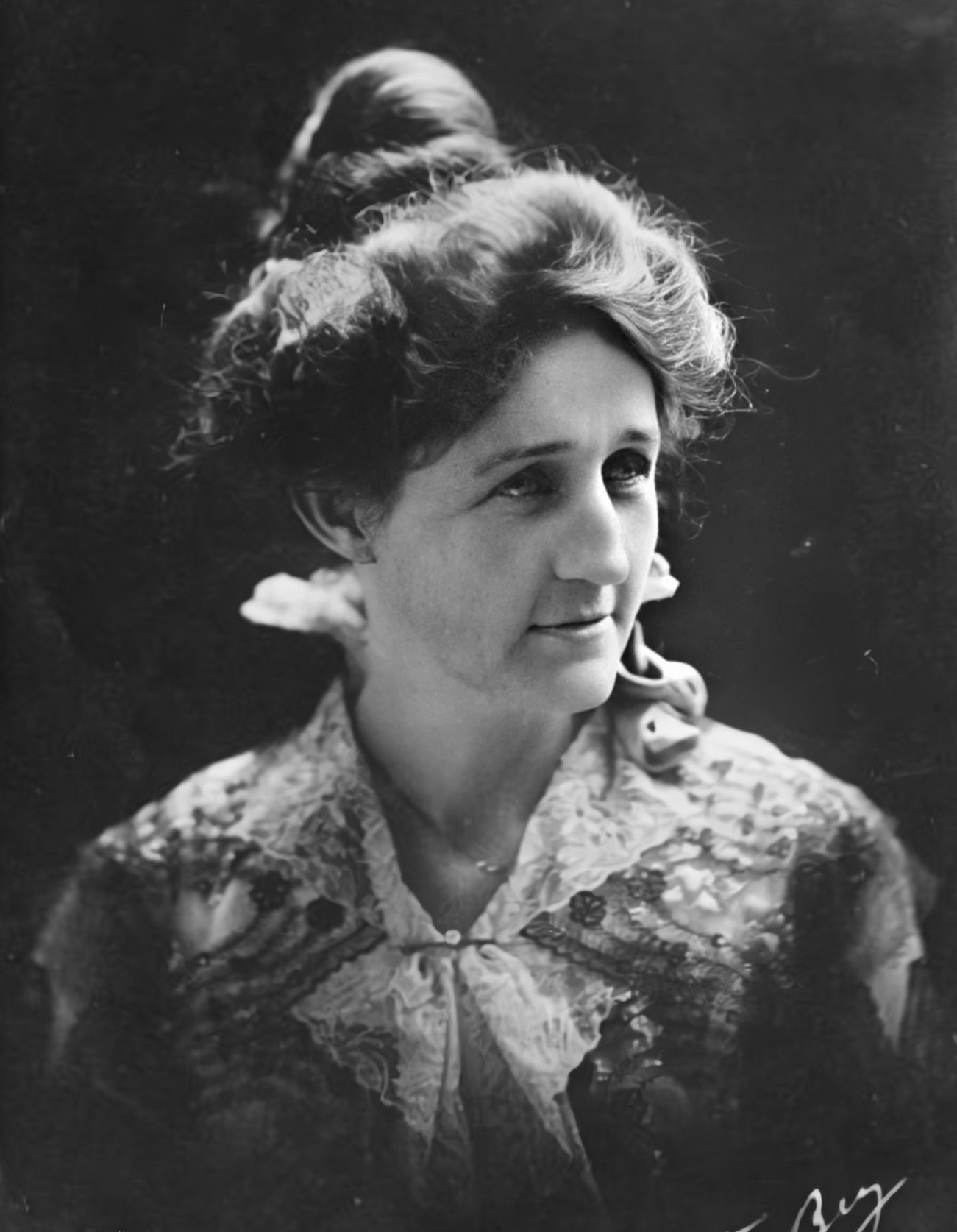
January 20, 1925: Miriam A. Ferguson of Texas sworn in as second woman Governor of a U.S. state.

The following events occurred in January 1925:

== January 1, 1925 (Thursday) ==
- Two scientific papers that changed our understanding of the universe were presented on the same day. Cecilia Payne-Gaposchkin completed her Ph.D. thesis, Stellar Atmospheres, described by astronomer Otto Struve as "the most brilliant PhD thesis ever written in astronomy", that led to our understanding that stars are primarily composed of hydrogen and helium, rather than heavier elements as previously thought. On the same day, at Corcoran Hall of George Washington University, astronomer Edwin Hubble presented to a New Year's Day meeting of the American Astronomical Society, his paper Cepheids in Spiral Nebulae, an analysis of the relation between the distance of remote galaxies and their relative velocity that showed the expansion of the Universe.
- Norway's capital, Christiania, was renamed Oslo.
- In the Rose Bowl, the unbeaten and untied (9–0–0) Notre Dame Fighting Irish defeated the unbeaten (7–0–1) Stanford University Indians, 27 to 10, before a crowd of 60,000 people in Pasadena. On the same day, the unbeaten (8–0–1) Penn Quakers visited the unbeaten (7–0–2) California Golden Bears in a postseason game at Berkeley, with California winning, 14 to 0, before 60,000 people. On November 22, Stanford and California had played to a 20–20 tie. Later in the year, economics professor Frank G. Dickinson of the University of Illinois ranked Notre Dame the best team of the 1924 season, followed by California as part of his "Dickinson ratings" that would later be recognized by the NCAA as determinative of a college football national champion.
- A small contingent of U.S. Marines arrived at Nanjing to patrol the vicinity of the university and protect Americans there from further looting.
- Costa Rica decided to withdraw from the League of Nations over the League's failure to address regional disputes.
- The states of Aleppo and Damascus were united into the State of Syria.
- Born: Paul Bomani, Tanzanian politician and ambassador; in Musoma, Tanganyika Territory (present-day Tanzania) (d. 2005)

== January 2, 1925 (Friday) ==
- Fresh violence broke out around Italy as Benito Mussolini's crackdown on opposition newspapers continued. Fascists seized or attacked newspaper presses while at least three were killed in rioting. Mussolini met with King Victor Emmanuel III and requested dictatorial powers to quell the chaos. The king refused, but gave Mussolini tacit permission to act however he considered necessary within at least the appearance of constitutional legality.
- Leo Chiozza Money testified before Britain's Royal Commission that an increase in the world's population had led to the country's food situation becoming as desperate as it was during the war. "The 10 pence price of bread has doubled in recent years and looking into the future there are good prospects of its doubling again", he stated. Money recommended a "department of supply" be created to remedy the problem.
- Born:
  - Giacomo Furia, Italian actor; in Arienzo, Kingdom of Italy (present-day Italy) (d. 2015)
  - Larry Harmon, American entertainer known for portraying Bozo the Clown; as Lawrence Weiss, in Toledo, Ohio, United States (d. 2008)
  - Eraño de Guzman Manalo, Philippine cleric and second Executive Minister (Tagapamahalang Pangkalahatan) of the Iglesia ni Cristo (Church of Christ); in San Juan City, Philippine Islands (present-day Philippines) (d. 2009)
- Died: Nikola Petroff, 51, Bulgarian wrestler (b. 1873)

== January 3, 1925 (Saturday) ==
- Benito Mussolini made a pivotal speech in the Italian Chamber of Deputies and responded to the Matteotti Crisis. He took personal responsibility for the actions of his Blackshirts, challenged his political opponents to remove him from office and then promised to take charge of restoring order to Italy within forty-eight hours. Historians now trace this speech to the beginning of Mussolini's dictatorship.
- Cyril Brownlie was sent off the field for foul play during a rough Test match against England during New Zealand's 1924–25 rugby union tour of Britain, Ireland and France. It was the first time such a severe sanction had ever been applied in an international rugby match. New Zealand won 17-11.
- In a matchup of two of the best teams of the 1924–25 NCAA men's basketball season, the visiting Princeton Tigers of the Ivy League (officially, the Eastern Intercollegiate League) defeated the Ohio State Buckeyes of the Big Ten Conference, 39 to 34, after trailing 15 to 22 at halftime. Both teams would win finish with only two losses and become champions of their conferences, with Ohio State at 14 wins and 2 losses. Princeton would finish with a record of 21 wins and 2 losses, and be retroactively selected by historians as the best team of the 1924–1925 season.

== January 4, 1925 (Sunday) ==
- Prefects throughout Italy received orders to control all "suspect" political organizations. Over the next two days, hundreds of private homes were searched, meeting halls were closed, political groups were disbanded and newspapers were seized.
- Adolf Hitler, whose Nazi Party had been banned in Bavaria since the failed Beer Hall Putsch, met with the state's Minister President Heinrich Held. Hitler pledged total loyalty to Held and offered to help him in his fight against communists.
- Born: Veikko Hakulinen, Finnish cross-country skier and gold medalist in three consecutive Winter Olympics games; in Kurkijoki, Karelian ASSR (present-day Finland) (d. 2003)
- Died: Nellie Cashman, 79, Irish-born prospector (b. 1845)

== January 5, 1925 (Monday) ==
- Nellie Tayloe Ross became the first woman to be elected as the governor of a U.S. state as she was inaugurated as Governor of Wyoming. Ross had won a special election on November 3 to fill the remainder of the term of her late husband, Governor William B. Ross, who had died on October 2. Mrs. Ross succeeded Frank Lucas, who had served as acting Governor upon Mr. Ross's death.
- The only two Italian Liberal Party ministers in Benito Mussolini's cabinet, Gino Sarrocchi and Alessandro Casati, turned in their resignations. They were to be replaced by loyal Fascists, who were now the only party in Mussolini's cabinet.
- The stage comedy Is Zat So?, later to be made into a silent film, began the first of 634 performances on Broadway, making its debut at the 39th Street Theatre before moving to Chanin's 46th Street Theatre. Later in the year, a second production would open on London's West End at the Adelphi Theatre. The play was co-authored by James Gleason (who oversaw the West End run) and Richard Taber (who stayed at Broadway).

== January 6, 1925 (Tuesday) ==
- At the Finnish-American A.C. Games held at Madison Square Garden, Finnish runner Paavo Nurmi set two new indoor records in front of a standing-room only crowd.
- Born: John DeLorean, American car manufacturer; in Detroit (d. 2005)

== January 7, 1925 (Wednesday) ==
- The new Al Jolson stage show Big Boy opened at the Winter Garden Theatre on Broadway.
- The German cruiser Emden was launched, the first large warship built in Germany since the end of the war.
- Born: Gerald Durrell, English naturalist, zookeeper, author, and television presenter; in Jamshedpur, Central Provinces, British India (present-day Jharkhand state, India) (d. 1995)

== January 8, 1925 (Thursday) ==
- In Italy, A joint manifesto signed by the leaders of the parties "on the Aventine" condemned Mussolini's suppression of dissent, writing, "The whole country can bear witness to the fact that the pretext of this policy is a ridiculous lie as no conspiracy is threatening the country and no attempt has been made against the laws." The manifesto suggested that Mussolini resign.
- In India, Bhanupratap Deo, the 3-year-old son of the late Lal Kamal Deo, was proclaimed as the new Raja of the Kanker State, a princely state within British India, and now part of the state of Chhattisgarh. He would rule until 1947, upon the independence of India and the abolition of princely states.
- Born:
  - Helmuth Hübener, German anti-Nazi youth activist; in Hamburg, Germany (d. 1942, executed)
  - Mohan Rakesh, Indian playwright and the author of Ashadh Ka Ek Din, the first modern Hindi language play; as Madan Mohan Guglani, in Amritsar, Punjab Province, British India (present-day Punjab state, India) (d. 1972)
- Died:
  - George Bellows, 42, American artist; died of peritonitis following a ruptured appendix (b. 1882)
  - Leo Koretz, 45, American lawyer and con man who masterminded the "Bayano Oil fraud", a Ponzi scheme that gathered $30 million from investors for false claims of oil fields; died in the Illinois State Penitentiary from diabetes (b. 1879)

== January 9, 1925 (Friday) ==
- British economist George Paish said that another war in Europe was inevitable unless Germany's reparations payments were reduced and the French were to leave the Rhineland. He also warned that "Germany will not make the mistake she made the last time, in having Russia as an enemy, but will have that nation as a friend. Germany and Russia will be able to overrun Europe and establish a military despotism."
- Born: Lee Van Cleef, American film actor; as Clarence LeRoy Van Cleef Jr., in Somerville, New Jersey, United States (d. 1989)

== January 10, 1925 (Saturday) ==
- The British submarine HMS L24 sank in the English Channel after colliding with the Royal Navy battleship HMS Resolution. All 43 men on L24 died.
- The Ku Klux Klan was banned from the state of Kansas when its Supreme Court ruled that it was a corporation organized for profit and therefore could not operate there without a charter.
- A clause in the Treaty of Versailles (articles 276 and 280), requiring Germany to grant most favored nation trade status with the former World War One allies, expired and allowed the Germans to negotiate their own economic ties.
- The deadline for the Allies to cease their occupation of the Germany's Rhineland passed without the withdrawal of French and Belgian forces. The government of France declared that the refusal was justified by "breaches of the disarmament clauses" of the Versailles Treaty.

== January 11, 1925 (Sunday) ==
- Beijing was seized by the combined forces of Sun Chuanfang and Qi Xieyuan.
- The Chinese Communist Party opened its Fourth Congress in Shanghai.
- Born: Grant Tinker, American television executive, co-founder of MTM Enterprises and creator of The Mary Tyler Moore Show; in Stamford, Connecticut, United States (d. 2016)

== January 12, 1925 (Monday) ==
- In Chicago, the North Side Gang tried to kill Al Capone, using Tommy guns to rake his car with bullets as it idled outside a State Street restaurant. Only Capone's bodyguard was wounded as Capone himself was doing business inside, but the attack prompted him to order Tommy guns for his own men, as well as his famous bulletproof Cadillac.
- The John Howard Lawson play Processional: A Jazz Symphony of American Life opened at the Garrick Theatre in New York.

== January 13, 1925 (Tuesday) ==
- A train crash in Westphalia in Germany killed 25 people and injured 60 others.
- Born:
  - Georgi Kaloyanchev, Bulgarian actor; in Burgas, Bulgaria (d. 2012)
  - Gwen Verdon, American actress and dancer; as Gwyneth Verdon, in Culver City, California, United States (d. 2000)

== January 14, 1925 (Wednesday) ==
- The Agreement Regarding the Distribution of the Dawes Annuities was signed in Paris among the Entente Powers, apportioning the distribution of the Central Powers' reparations payments, including those of Germany under the Dawes Plan, among the various countries that were entitled to the payments.
- Born: Yukio Mishima, Japanese writer; as Kimitake Hiraoka, in Shinjuku, Tokyo, Empire of Japan (present-day Japan) (d. 1970)
- Died:
  - Camille Decoppet, 62, Swiss politician, served as a Federal Councilor from 1912 to 1919 (b. 1862)
  - Harry Furniss, 70, English cartoonist, illustrator and animation pioneer (b. 1854)

== January 15, 1925 (Thursday) ==
- Hans Luther became the new Chancellor of Germany, replacing Wilhelm Marx and forming a coalition government from five political parties that combined to have 294 of the 493 seats in the Reichstag.
- Soviet leader Joseph Stalin fired Leon Trotsky as Commisar for Military and Naval Affairs. He was replaced by Mikhail Frunze.

== January 16, 1925 (Friday) ==
- Blues artist Huddie Ledbetter, more popularly known as Lead Belly, was granted a full pardon by Texas governor Pat Morris Neff, having served the minimum seven years of his prison sentence after killing one of his own relatives in a fight over a woman. Neff had been impressed by a religiously themed song about forgiveness that Lead Belly had written and performed for him during a visit he made to the prison the previous year.
- Italy passed a new electoral bill containing a controversial provision for "plural voting". Double votes were to be given to academians, professors, those with diplomas, knights, military officers, those with any military decorations, officeholders, certain business personnel, all those paying a direct tax of 100 lira or more, and fathers of at least five children. Triple votes were to be given to members of the royal family, members of high nobility, cardinals, highly decorated war veterans, high officeholders, or anyone who met three conditions for double votes. The opposition blasted the provision as disproportionately favouring the wealthy, but Mussolini contended that it would help to encourage educated and productive Italians.
- Died: Aleksey Kuropatkin, 76, Russian general and Imperial Russian Minister of War (b. 1848)

== January 17, 1925 (Saturday) ==
- Miriam A. Ferguson became the first female governor of Texas and the second in United States history.
- Italy's Chamber of Deputies repealed the "plural voting" provision in the electoral bill passed the previous day. Mussolini consented to the change upon the advice of labour leaders within his party who feared it would draw too much resentment from the working class.
- Born: Duane Hanson, American sculptor; in Alexandria, Minnesota, United States (d. 1996)

== January 18, 1925 (Sunday) ==
- "The Gentleman Bandit" Gerald Chapman was apprehended on a street in Muncie, Indiana. On his person he had $5,000 cash, $3,000 in bonds, $500 worth of jewelry, a pint of nitroglycerin, burglary tools and part of a sawed-through padlock.
- Born:
  - Gilles Deleuze, French philosopher; in Paris, France (d. 1995)
  - Sol Yurick, American novelist; as Solomon Yurick, in New York City, United States (d. 2013)
  - Bob McConnell, American baseball historian, author of The Home Run Encyclopedia; as Robert McConnell, in Seattle, United States (d. 2012)
  - Jesús Díaz, Mexican professional baseball outfielder, 1942 Mexican League Rookie of the Year, inductee to the Mexican Professional Baseball Hall of Fame; in Torreón, Coahuila, Mexico (d. 1988)

== January 19, 1925 (Monday) ==
- Hjalmar Branting announced that, because of health, he was resigning as Prime Minister of Sweden. Branting died five weeks after stepping down.
- The League of Nations opened the second session of the Second Opium Conference with the goal of reducing the worldwide trafficking and use of opium.
- Seattle Police Department Lieutenant Roy Olmstead was indicted by a U.S. federal grand jury, along with 89 other defendants, for smuggling alcohol from Canada into the United States, in violation of the Volstead Act. Convicted in 1926 along with 20 other defendants based on evidence gathered from wiretapping made on his telephone without a warrant, Olmstead would challenge the conviction in the case of Olmstead v. United States. Ultimately, the U.S. Supreme Court would rule, 5 to 4, that wiretapping was legal, a decision that would not be overturned until 1967 in Katz v. United States.
- German Chancellor Hans Luther and President Paul Löbe were mercilessly heckled to an unprecedented degree in the Reichstag as the new Cabinet was introduced and Luther outlined the new government's policies, including support for the Dawes Plan. Cries such as "traitor", "crook" and "monarchist" rang out from republican benches.
- Died: Marie Sophie of Bavaria, 83, the last Queen consort of the Kingdom of the Two Sicilies (b. 1841)

== January 20, 1925 (Tuesday) ==
- The Soviet–Japanese Basic Convention was signed by Soviet Deputy Foreign Minister Lev Karakhan and Japanese Ambassador in China Kenkichi Yoshizawa, as Japan and the Soviet Union restored diplomatic relations severed during the Bolshevik revolution in 1917, and reached a number of agreements on matters that had previously been disputed between them. Japan agreed to withdraw troops from the northern part of the island of Sakhalin, which Japan agreed to withdraw from by May 15 in exchange for oil and coal concessions.
- The Chamber of Deputies of Luxembourg voted to reject a treaty that had been signed with Belgium in 1924 by Prime Minister Émile Reuter.
- Miriam A. "Ma" Ferguson was sworn into office as the Governor of Texas, becoming the second woman to assume leadership of a U.S. state after winning an election.
- Germany's Chancellor Hans Luther and Foreign Minister Gustav Stresemann sent a secret memorandum to Britain suggesting a non-aggression pact between Germany and all nations with an "interest" in the Rhine valley, in return for a German guarantee to respect its post-war boundaries with France and Belgium.

== January 21, 1925 (Wednesday) ==
- Chancellor Hans Luther casually admitted in a speech to the Reichstag that his Cabinet had discussed changing the form of government, but had decided to remain a constitutional republic. The statement fueled charges from republicans that Luther was preparing to restore the German monarchy, as his Cabinet included several known monarchists.
- The Soviet Union held mass demonstrations culminating in five minutes of silence in observation of the first anniversary of Vladimir Lenin's death.
- Born:
  - Charles Aidman, American actor; in Frankfort, Indiana, United States (d. 1993)
  - Arnold Skaaland, American professional wrestler and manager; in White Plains, New York, United States (d. 2007)

== January 22, 1925 (Thursday) ==
- A radio telegram was sent out through the U.S. Army Signal Corps by Curtis Welch, the only doctor in Nome, Alaska, alerting all major towns in Alaska of an impending outbreak of diphtheria. Another was sent to the U.S. Public Health Service in Washington, D.C. explaining the desperate need for antitoxin.
- The Richard Eichberg-directed German romance film The Motorist Bride was released.
- Born: Katherine MacLean, American science fiction author; in Glen Ridge, New Jersey, United States (d. 2019)
- Died: Fanny Bullock Workman, 66, American adventurer (b. 1859)

== January 23, 1925 (Friday) ==
- A coup d'état in Chile overthrew the September Junta.
- Born: Danny Arnold, American actor and television writer-producer; as Arnold Rothmann, in New York City, United States (d. 1995)

== January 24, 1925 (Saturday) ==
- Rickard Sandler, Sweden's Minister of Commerce and Industry, took office as the new Prime Minister of Sweden, succeeding Hjalmar Branting.
- Chicago Outfit gangster Johnny Torrio survived an assassination attempt when Hymie Weiss and Bugs Moran jumped him as he and his wife were returning to their apartment from a shopping trip. Torrio was shot multiple times, but Moran's gun clicked empty when he tried to deliver a coup de grâce to Torrio's head.
- A total solar eclipse occurred.
- Born:
  - Gus Mortson, Canadian professional hockey player; as James Angus Gerald Mortson, in New Liskeard, Ontario, Canada (d. 2015)
  - Maria Tallchief, American ballerina, first Native American prima ballerina; as Elizabeth Marie Tall Chief, in Fairfax, Oklahoma, United States (d. 2013)

== January 25, 1925 (Sunday) ==
- The tomb of Tutankhamun was reopened in Egypt so Howard Carter could resume his archaeological work. Carter was disappointed to find that the pall which had covered the sarcophagus was now ruined because someone in Egypt's antiquities department had carelessly stored it in a wooden shed that did not provide adequate protection from sunlight.
- The Fedrelandslaget, a right-wing political organization, was founded in Norway by Fridtjof Nansen and former Prime Minister Christian Michelsen.

== January 26, 1925 (Monday) ==
- At the direction of the Communist Party of the Soviet Union, Leon Trotsky was dismissed from command of the Armed Forces of the Soviet Union and was replaced as People's Commissar for Military and Naval Affairs by Mikhail Frunze.
- A total of 300,000 units of antitoxin were located in Anchorage, enough to contain the Alaskan diphtheria epidemic temporarily.
- Born:
  - Paul Newman, American actor, entrepreneur and activist; in Shaker Heights, Ohio, United States (d. 2008)
  - Joan Leslie, American actress and dancer; as Joan Agnes Theresa Sadie Brodel, in Detroit, United States (d. 2015)
- Died:
  - Caspar F. Goodrich, 78, American admiral of the United States Navy (b. 1847)
  - Sir James Mackenzie, 71, Scottish cardiologist (b. 1853)

== January 27, 1925 (Tuesday) ==
- The January Junta was established to restore Arturo Alessandri to power in Chile.
- A number of injuries were reported in Berlin as rioting broke out among monarchists, communists and republicans during demonstrations held on the birthday of former kaiser Wilhelm II.
- Alaskan Territorial Governor Scott Cordelle Bone gave the final authorization for a succession of dog sled teams to deliver the antitoxin to Nome to relieve the diphtheria epidemic, beginning the relay that would become known as the 1925 serum run to Nome. "Wild Bill" Shannon was the first of 20 dog sled team mushers in a relay to deliver the medicine over the 674 miles (1,085 km) route from Nenana to Nome, Alaska.

== January 28, 1925 (Wednesday) ==
- A contingent of Russian mercenaries working for the Fengtian clique captured Shanghai with no resistance.
- Harlan Fiske Stone became the first nominee to the U.S. Supreme Court to testify before the U.S. Senate Judiciary Committee prior to the vote on his confirmation. After his testimony, the U.S. Senate would vote to confirm him on February 5 by a vote of 71 to 6.
- Actress Gloria Swanson married the French nobleman Henry de La Falaise in Paris. The marriage would last until 1931.
- Born: Raja Ramanna, Indian nuclear physicist and director of the Bhabha Atomic Research Centre that developed India's first nuclear bomb; in Tiptur, Mysore princely state, British India (present-day Karnataka state, India) (d. 2004)

== January 29, 1925 (Thursday) ==
- Twenty people were killed and 20 wounded in Shanghai when representatives of the Fengtian Clique met resistance attempting to disarm about 1,000 defeated Jiangsu troops.
- The largest pharmaceutical manufacturer in Japan, Takeda Pharmaceutical Company, was incorporated as Chobei Takeda & Co., Ltd.
- Born: Robert W. McCollum, American virologist and epidemiologist; in Waco, Texas, United States (d. 2010)

== January 30, 1925 (Friday) ==
- The Khost rebellion by members of various Pashtun tribes against King Amanullah Khan of Afghanistan was ended after 10 months of fighting and 14,000 deaths
- Cave explorer Floyd Collins was trapped in Sand Cave, Kentucky, when he dislodged a rock that fell and pinned his leg. Efforts to rescue him over the next eighteen days would become a subject of national media attention.
- Turkish authorities exiled the Ecumenical Patriarch of Constantinople Constantine VI to Greece, to strong objections from the Greek public.
- The Owencarrow Viaduct Disaster killed four people when high winds blew a train off a viaduct in County Donegal, Ireland.

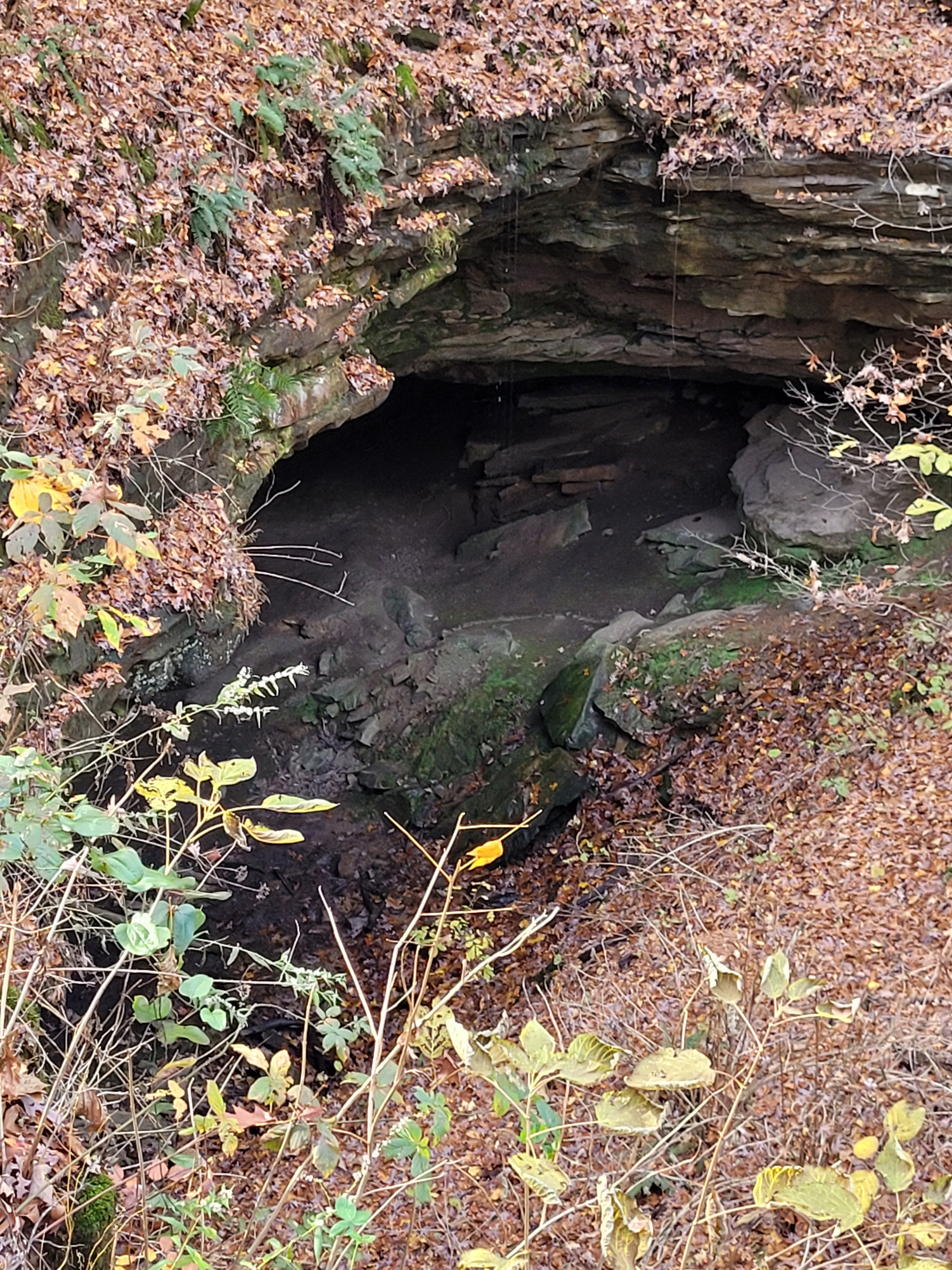
The entrance of Sand Cave in 2021

- Antitoxin ran out in Nome as the serum run reached Kaltag.
- Born: Douglas Engelbart, American inventor and computing pioneer; in Portland, Oregon, United States (d. 2013)

== January 31, 1925 (Saturday) ==
- The dog sled team of Leonhard Seppala with lead dog Togo ran the longest and most perilous leg of the serum run, through the dark across the dangerous ice of Norton Sound.
- Died: George Washington Cable, 81, American novelist (b. 1844)
