= February 1925 =

Month of 1925

<<	February 1925					>>
Su	Mo	Tu	We	Th	Fr	Sa
1	2	3	4	5	6	7
8	9	10	11	12	13	14
15	16	17	18	19	20	21
22	23	24	25	26	27	28

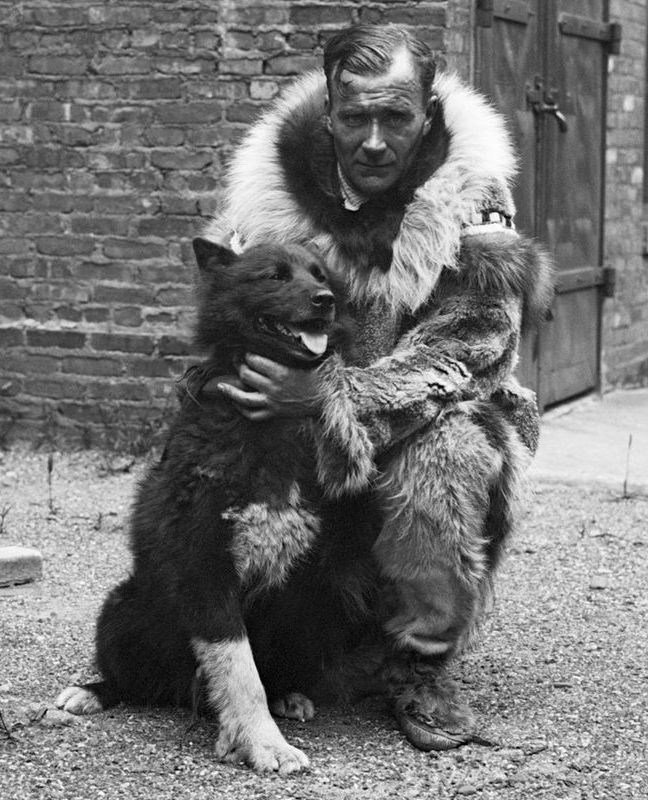
February 2, 1925: Gunnar Kaasen and his dog Balto save Nome, Alaska, from diphtheria

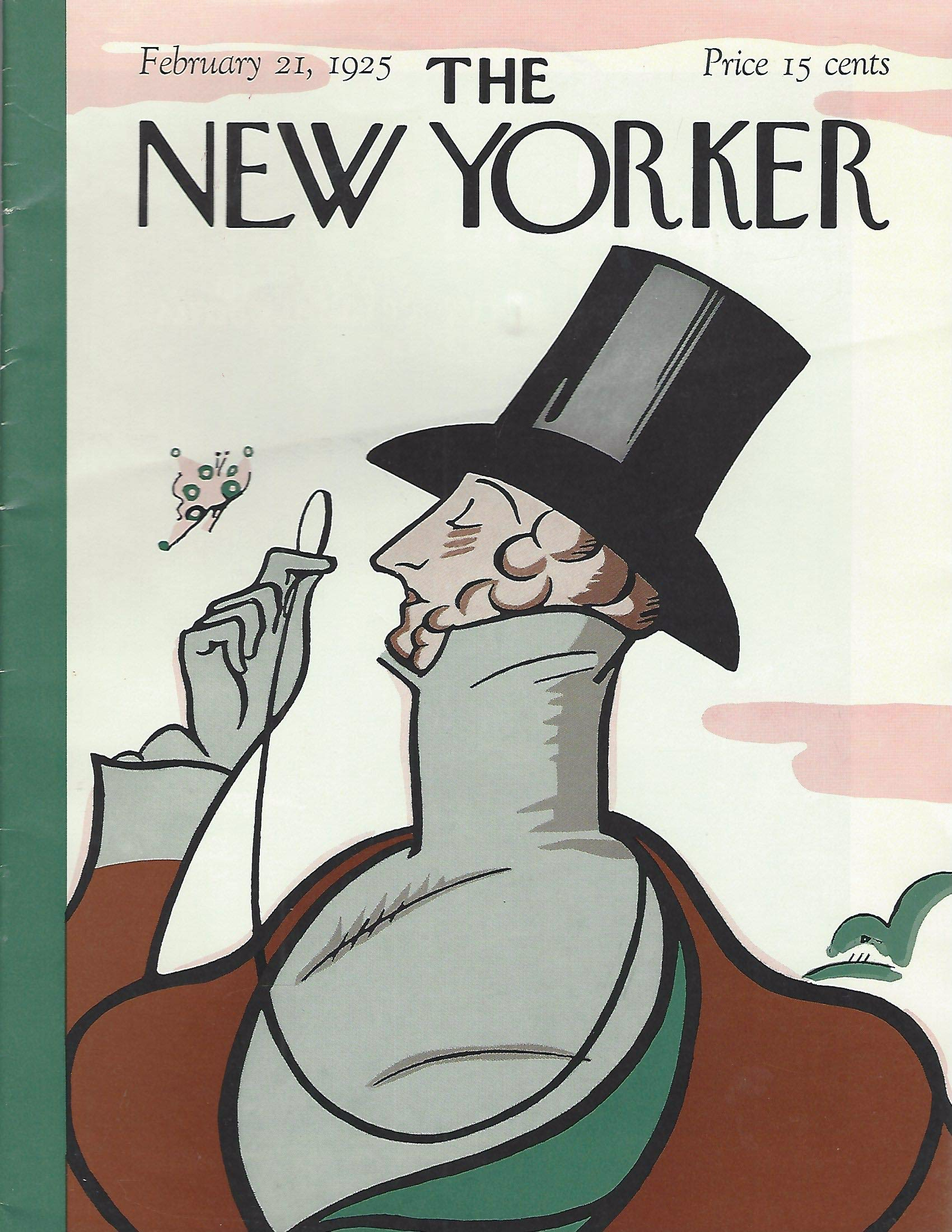
February 21, 1925: The first issue of The New Yorker is sold at newsstands.

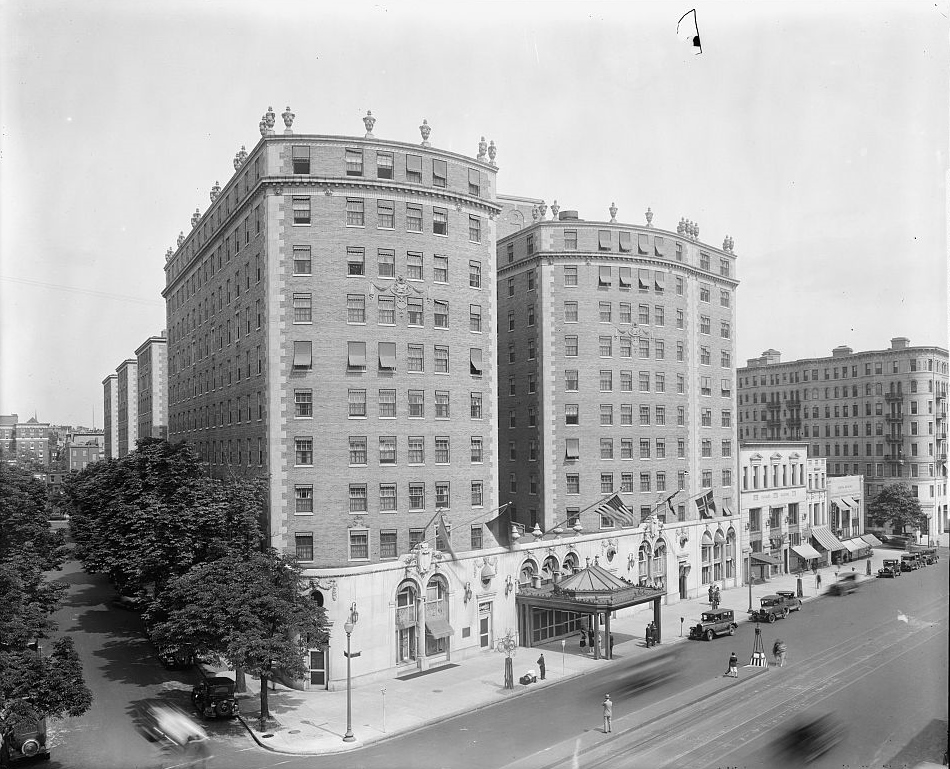
February 18, 1925: Washington's luxury Mayflower Hotel opens

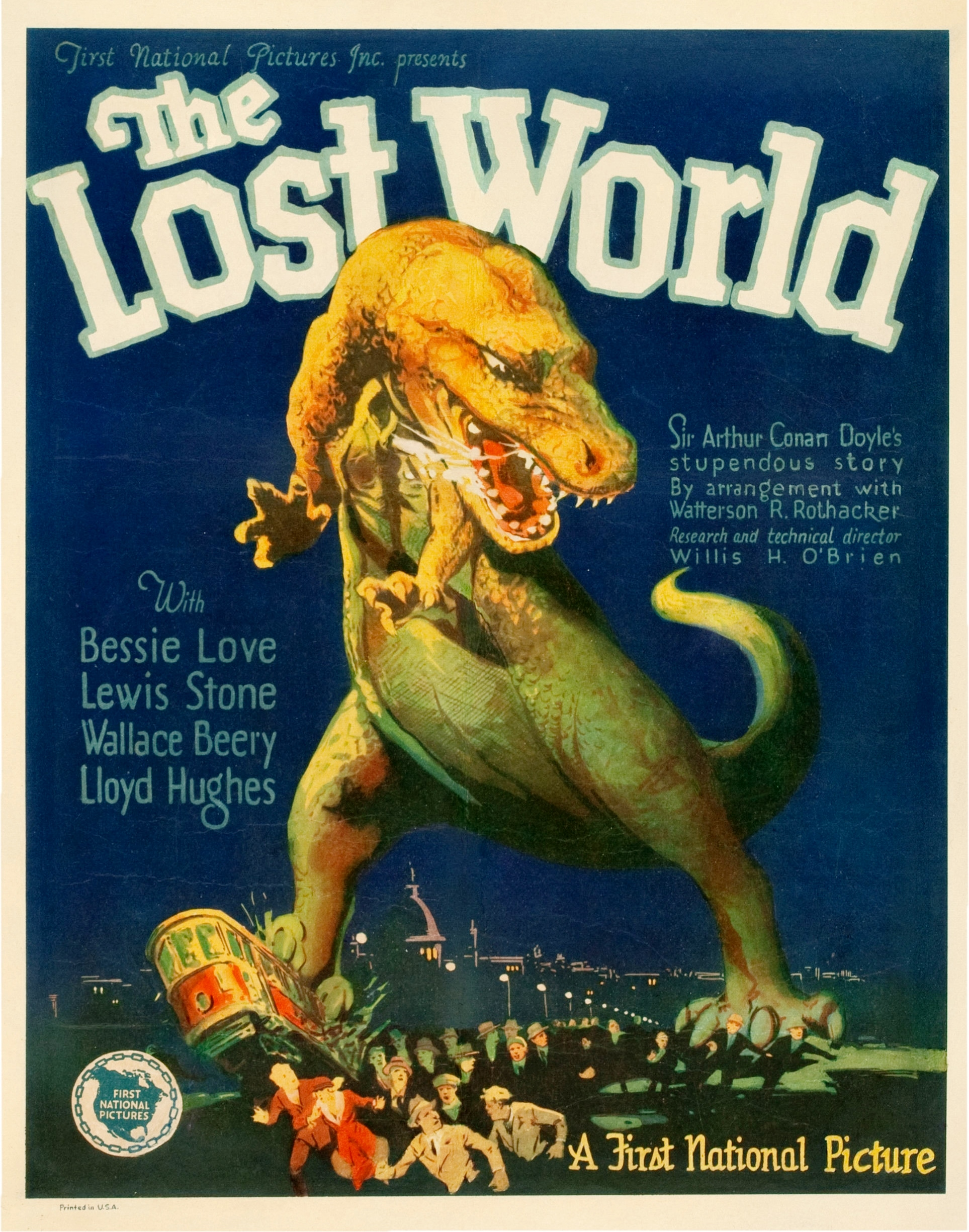
February 8, 1925: Stop-motion film The Lost World premieres

The following events occurred in February 1925:

== February 1, 1925 (Sunday) ==
- Ahmed Zog became the first President of Albania, in addition to continuing its Prime Minister and commander of the new Royal Albanian Army.
- W. T. Cosgrave, Irish President appealed to the U.S. for food aid. Ireland's potato crop had been severely curtailed by heavy rainfall the previous summer and autumn.
- The final leg of the serum run to Nome began as the team of Gunnar Kaasen and lead dog Balto set out from Bluff, Alaska at 10:00 p.m. into a blizzard.
- Dr. Miguel Paz Barahona was sworn into office for a four-year term as President of Honduras, after previously being a surgeon and the Central American nation as Vice President from 1921 to 1925.
- Polskie Radio Warszawa went on the air as the first radio station in Poland, doing test transmissions for 14 months, before beginning regular broadcasts on April 18, 1926.
- Herma Szabo of Austria won the Ladies Competition of the World Figure Skating Championships in Davos, Switzerland.
- Born:
  - Dr. Tomisaku Kawasaki, Japanese pediatrician who first identified and described (in 1967) Kawasaki disease, the leading cause of acquired heart disease in children; in Asakusa, Tokyo, Empire of Japan (present-day Japan) (d. 2020)
  - Mary Nesbitt Wisham, American baseball player for the Racine Belles, and 1945 All-American Girls Professional Baseball League batting champion; in Greenville, South Carolina, United States (d. 2013)
  - John F. Yardley, American aeronautical engineer for McDonnell Aircraft Corporation who served for NASA as launch operations manager at Cape Canaveral from 1960 to 1964, and technical director for Project Gemini from 1964 to 1978; in St. Louis, United States (d. 2001)

== February 2, 1925 (Monday) ==
- The serum run ended successfully as the team of Gunnar Kaasen and a team of 15 Siberian huskies fronted by Kaasen's lead dog, Balto, arrived in Nome, Alaska at 5:30 a.m. to deliver the antitoxin necessary to combat a diphtheria epidemic in the Alaska Territory.
- U.S. President Calvin Coolidge signed the Kelly Act (officially the Air Mail Act of 1925) into law two months after the legislation had been introduced in Congress by U.S. Representative M. Clyde Kelly. In addition to relieving the U.S. Post Office Department and the U.S. Army from responsibility for delivering airmail, the Act allowed the Postmaster General to make contracts with private air carriers, prompting multiple companies to venture into manufacturing aircraft. The U.S. Civil Aeronautics Board would opine 50 years later that "The history of civil aviation in the United States in practical terms" began with the Kelly Act. The Kelly Act has been described as "the foundation that commercial aviation is built upon." The first contracts were awarded to Colonial Air Transport, National Air Transport, Robertson Aircraft Corporation, Western Air Express and Varney Air Lines.
- Previously limited to catalog sales, Sears, Roebuck, & Co. opened its first department store at 8:30 in the morning at its headquarters at Homan Avenue and Arthington Street in Chicago. An ad proclaimed that "A sale unprecedented in Chicago's history will then begin. Never has any store in Chicago, or elsewhere, for that matter, been able to offer the savings Sears, Roebuck and Co. do! We can do it! We are the World's Largest Store."
- The location of the tomb of Egyptian queen Hetepheres I, mother of the Pharaoh Cheops (Khufu) and wife of the Pharaoh Sneferu in the 26th century BC, was inadvertently discovered at Giza more than 4,500 years after her burial. A photographer with the expedition of archaeologist George Andrew Reisner was setting up a camera tripod to take photos of the Great Pyramid of Giza (where Cheops was buried) when one of the legs of the tripod slipped into a crevice in the rock which turned out to be the seal to a shaft and a staircase. Removal of debris from the staircase showed it to be an entrance to the tomb of Hetepheres.
- Born:
  - Elaine Stritch, American actress and singer; in Detroit, United States (d. 2014)
  - Lieutenant General Witarmin, Commander of Army Special Forces Command of Indonesia from 1970 to 1975; in Kutorejo, East Java, Dutch East Indies (present-day Indonesia) (d. 1987)
  - Jeet Singh Negi, Indian musical composer known for the promotion of music from the Garhwal region of the Uttarakhand state; in Paidalsyun, Garhwal Kingdom, United Provinces of Agra and Oudh British India (present-day Uttarakhand, India) (d. 2020)
- Died: Jaap Eden, 51, Dutch speed skater and bicycle racer who won the world speed skating championships in 1893, 1895 and 1896, and the track cycling world championships in 1894 and 1895 (b. 1873)

== February 3, 1925 (Tuesday) ==
- A newspaper reporter for The Courier-Journal, a daily newspaper in Louisville, Kentucky, interviewed Floyd Collins, who had been trapped underground while exploring a cave in Kentucky. William Burke Miller, a 20-year-old employee of the newspaper, had been assigned by his editor to cover the story of the attempted rescue of Collins, who had been trapped since January 30. Small enough to climb into the cave opening, and hanging upside down to get close enough to Collins to provide drinks from a bottle of whiskey and a bottle of milk, Miller talked with the trapped man on three occasions as he led rescue parties. He quoted Miller as saying "I'm not afraid to die. I've no reason to be. I believe I would go to Heaven. But I don't believe I'm going to die. I feel I'm going to be taken out alive and that I'll not lose my foot," and reported that Collins would be dead 10 days later. Miller would receive a Pulitzer Prize in 1926 for his coverage of the Collins story.
- The discovery of the Taung Child fossilized skull in South Africa the previous November was first publicized.
- The first privately owned bank in Bulgaria, Girdap, declared bankruptcy after more than 43 years of operation, and its three managers, Boncho Boev, Ivan Kovachev and Nikola Kovachev, were placed under arrest.
- The first electric train in India ran between Victoria Terminus and Kurla in Bombay on a 16 km journey, using EMU's with 1500 V DC traction.
- Born:
  - John Fiedler, American character actor; in Platteville, Wisconsin, United States (d. 2005)
  - Leon Schlumpf, Swiss politician who served as President of the Swiss Confederation in 1984 and on the Swiss Federal Council from 1979 to 1987; in Felsberg, Switzerland (d. 2012)
  - Alexinia Baldwin, African American educator, creator of the Baldwin Identification Matrix; in Alabama, United States (d. 2017)
- Died:
  - Oliver Heaviside, 74, English mathematician specializing in electromagnetic theory, known for the Heaviside step function and for predicting the existence of the Kennelly–Heaviside layer (b. 1850)
  - Edward Scofield, 82, American politician and former prisoner of war during the American Civil War, who later served as the Governor of Wisconsin from 1897 to 1901 (b. 1842)

== February 4, 1925 (Wednesday) ==
- Nels Nelsen set a new world record for ski jumping with a leap of 240 feet (73.152 metres) in Revelstoke, British Columbia. He was said to be sick with the flu when he made the jump.
- The tunnel that was being used to reach trapped cave explorer Floyd Collins collapsed, requiring a new tunnel to be dug.
- Born: Arne Åhman, Swedish track athlete and 1948 Olympic gold medalist for the triple jump; in Nordingrå, Sweden (d. 2022)
- Died:
  - Robert Koldewey, 69, German architect and archaeologist known for his excavations of the ancient city of Babylon in modern-day Iraq from 1899 to 1914, including the discovery of the foundations of the Ishtar Gate (b. 1855)
  - William Haggar, 73, British filmmaker (b. 1851)

== February 5, 1925 (Thursday) ==
- Ten people were arrested in the Soviet Union for conspiring to assassinate Grigory Zinoviev.
- U.S. Attorney General Harlan F. Stone was confirmed as an associate justice of the U.S. Supreme Court in order to replace Justice Joseph McKenna, who had resigned on January 5 because of cognitive problems caused by a stroke. The U.S. Senate voted, 71 to 6, in favor of confirming Stone, who would later serve as Chief Justice of the United States.
- Died:
  - Julius Fleischmann, 53, American businessman, served as the President of The Fleischmann Company from 1897 until his death, and Mayor of Cincinnati from 1900 to 1905; died of a heart attack (b. 1871)
  - Pablo Ocampo, 72, Filipino lawyer, served as the first delegate to the U.S. Congress as the non-voting Resident Commissioner from the Philippine Islands from 1907 to 1909 (b. 1853)

== February 6, 1925 (Friday) ==
- Prime Minister Chandra Shamsher Jang Bahadur Rana of Nepal announced his intention to abolish slavery in the country.
- Former German Chancellor Gustav Bauer resigned his Reichstag seat in disgrace, becoming the most prominent German politician to lose his job because of his involvement in the Barmat corruption scandal.
- In the U.S. state of New Jersey, the basketball team of Passaic High School lost after 159 consecutive victories since in almost six years, falling to the Hackensack High School Comets, 39 to 35, at Hackensack. The Passaic Indians' streak began after it had lost the New Jersey state high school championship on March 15, 1919. In the seasons since then, Passaic had outscored its opponents, by 9,413 points to 3,237.
- The end of the world and the Second Coming of Christ failed to take place despite a prediction of Margaret W. Rowen of California and Robert Reidt of New York, both members of the Reformed Seventh-day Adventist Church, that the world would end on February 6, 1925. Mrs. Rowen had made the prediction as early as January 20, 1924, to a gathering of followers at Pomona, California.
- Born: Pramoedya Ananta Toer, Indonesian novelist; in Blora, Dutch East Indies (present day Indonesia) (d. 2006)

== February 7, 1925 (Saturday) ==
- The first elections were held in Trinidad and Tobago, at the time a British crown colony, as some residents were allowed to vote for seven of the 12 seats of the Legislative Council. However, the right to vote was limited to persons who owned rental property worth at least $60. Men had to be at least 21 years old, and women at least 30, and all voters were required to understand spoken English. People who had received poor relief six months before election day were ineligible. As a result, only six percent of the population could vote. The local candidates had to be men, literate in English, who owned property worth at least $12,000 or who received at least $960 of rent from tenants.
- Eleven crewmembers of the Japanese Imperial Navy cruiser Izumo were killed when the boat they were in was struck by a tugboat off the coast of Vancouver in Canada.
- World heavyweight boxing champion Jack Dempsey and Hollywood film actress Estelle Taylor were married in a small ceremony in San Diego.
- Born: Hans Schmidt, Canadian professional wrestler; as Guy Larose, in Joliette, Quebec, Canada (d. 2012)

== February 8, 1925 (Sunday) ==
- The American fantasy adventure film The Lost World, notable for being the first to include special effects, premiered at the Astor Theatre in New York City before being released to other cinemas. Willis O'Brien used the stop motion technique to create the illusion of dinosaurs and other extinct creatures in action.
- Parliamentary elections were held in the Kingdom of Serbs, Croats and Slovenes. The People's Radical Party (Narodna radikalna stranka or NRS), led by Prime Minister Nikola Pašić gained 15 seats in the remained the largest faction in the unicameral National Assembly, with 123 of the 315 seats for a 39% plurality.

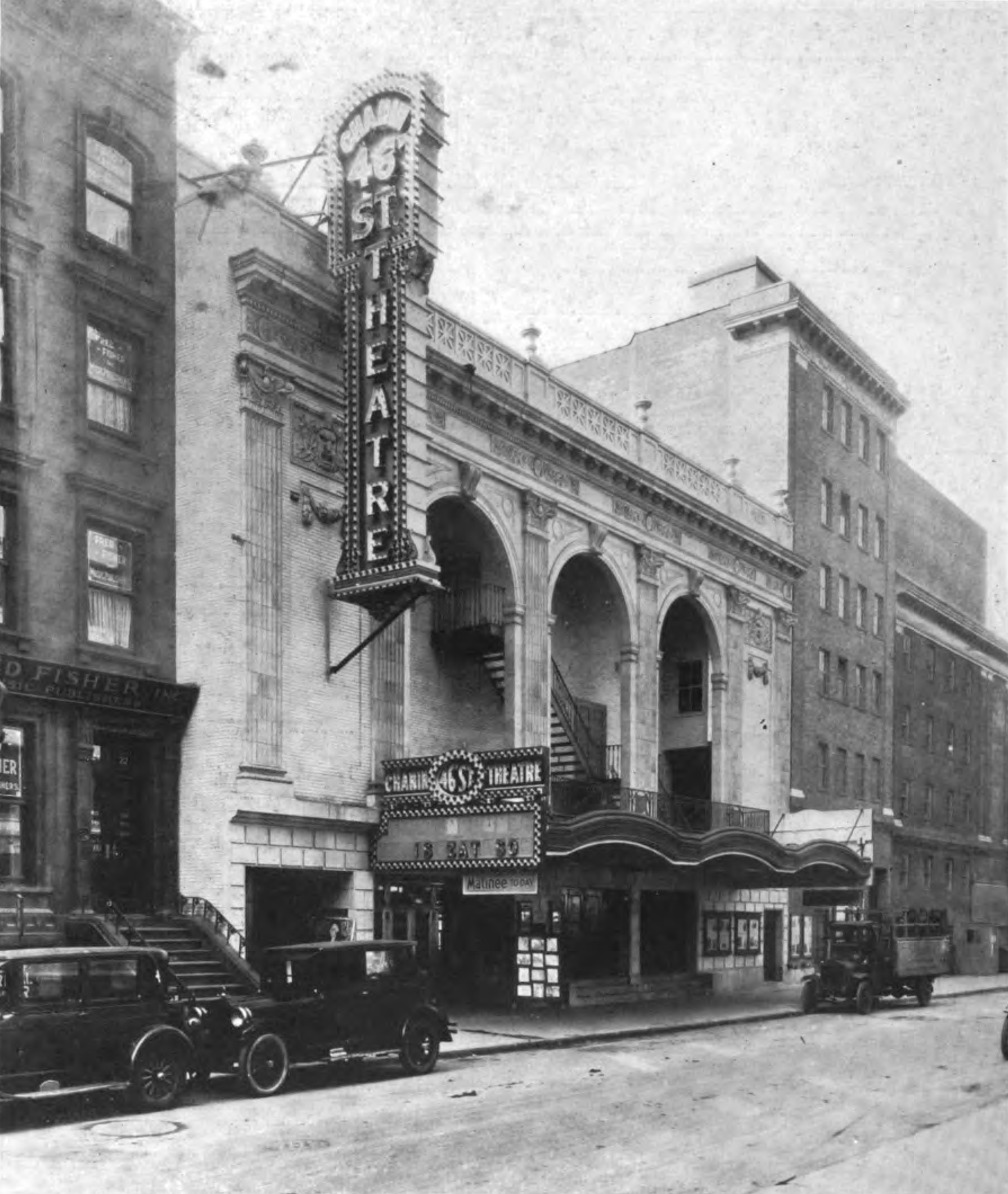
Chanin's 46th Street Theatre

- What is now the Richard Rodgers Theatre, one of the Broadway theaters for major U.S. stage productions, opened by Irwin S. Chanin in New York City as Chanin's 46th Street Theatre.
- Born:
  - Jack Lemmon, American actor, Academy Awards winner for Mister Roberts in 1955 and Save the Tiger in 1973; Golden Globe Awards for Best Actor for Some Like It Hot (1960), The Apartment (1961) and Avanti! (1973), as well as two Primetime Emmy Awards; in Newton, Massachusetts, United States (d. 2001)
  - Eugene Curnow, American veterinarian who pioneered the concept of the Mobile Pet Clinic in 1975; in Lake City, Minnesota, United States (d. 2010).

== February 9, 1925 (Monday) ==
- Germany presented a conciliatory memorandum to France proposing a mutual guarantee of the existing border between the two countries.
- In a fight at the Grand National Assembly of Turkey between two members, Halit Karsıalan was shot and mortally wounded by Ali Çetinkaya. Karsıalan died five days later.
- The comedy play Loggerheads featuring Whitford Kane opened in New York City.
- Born:
  - John B. Cobb, Japanese-born American process theologian and philosopher; in Kobe, Empire of Japan (present-day Japan) (d. 2024)
  - Vic Wertz, American professional baseball player and 4-time American League all-star; as Victor Wertz, in York, Pennsylvania, United States (d. 1983)
- Died:
  - Emanuel Edward Klein, 80, Croatian-born British bacteriologist referred to as "the father of British microbiology" (b. 1844)
  - Prince Asdang Dejavudh, 35, heir to the throne of Thailand and brother of King Vajiravudh; died of kidney disease (b. 1889)
  - Eugene P. Bicknell, 65, American botanist and ornithologist known for the discovery of the bird Bicknell's thrush (Catharus bicknelli) and the plant Bicknell's sedge (Carex bicknellii) (b. 1859)

== February 10, 1925 (Tuesday) ==
- The Roman Catholic Church, represented by Vatican Secretary of State Pietro Gasparri, signed a concordat with Poland, represented by Stanisław Grabski, establishing diplomatic relations, guaranteeing the full protection by the Polish government of the Catholic Church, in return for the solemn oath of allegiance by Catholic clerics to the Polish government.
- The U.S.-Canadian Fishing Agreement was signed, outlining fishing rights for the respective countries.
- Dr. Anton Höfle, Germany's Minister of Posts, was arrested on charges of bribery the day after resigning his office after being charged with accepting 120,000 Reichsmarks the year before from Julius and Henry Barmat in return for Höfle's approval of a loan of 14.5 million Marks. Höfle committed suicide two months later by an overdose of sleeping pills drugs before he could be brought to trial.
- Born: Pierre Mondy, French actor and director; as Pierre Cuq, in Neuilly-sur-Seine, France (d. 2012)
- Died:
  - Aline Réveillaud de Lens, 43, French novelist and painter; died of breast cancer (b. 1881)
  - Sir Robert Coryndon, 54, British colonial administrator, served as the Governor of Kenya from 1922 until his death (b. 1870)

== February 11, 1925 (Wednesday) ==
- An explosion killed 138 German miners at Dortmund.
- Scheduled round-trip long-distance coach bus service began in Britain as Greyhound Motors (unrelated to Greyhound Lines in the United States) inaugurated its route between London and Bristol and places in between, with the 115 miles (185 km) trip taking four hours from one point to the other.
- The Agreement concerning the Manufacture of, Internal Trade in and Use of Prepared Opium was signed in Geneva by representatives of the United Kingdom and the British Empire; Canada, France, Japan, Thailand, and Portugal, and would take effect on July 28, 1926.
- In the British House of Commons, Ellen Wilkinson, an MP from the Labour party, took the unprecedented step of addressing the House without wearing a hat, a requirement not expected of men addressing the Commons. Reginald Applin of the Conservatives asked for a ruling from the Speaker of the House on whether her non-compliance with the expected dress code was in order, and the Speaker ruled in Wilkinson's favor, setting a precedent for women MPs.
- During a live performance on Broadway of the play Hell's Bells, actor Eddie Garvie accidentally shot another actor, Clifton Self, after being handed a loaded gun by the prop department. The bullet narrowly missed actress Shirley Booth, who was waiting off stage and preparing to make an entrance. Self received a flesh wound in his left arm but was able to resume performing after a 20-minute intermission.
- Born:
  - Virginia E. Johnson, American sexologist known for the Masters and Johnson books Human Sexual Response (1966) and Human Sexual Inadequacy (1970); as Mary Virginia Eshelman, in Springfield, Missouri, United States (d. 2013)
  - Kim Stanley, American actress, inductee to the American Theatre Hall of Fame; as Patricia Kimberley Reid, in Tularosa, New Mexico, United States (d. 2001)
  - Amparo Rivelles, Spanish film actress and winner of the first person to win the Goya Award for Best Actress; as María Amparo Rivelles Ladrón de Guevara, in Madrid, Spain (d. 2013)
- Died: Henri Eduard Beunke, 73, Dutch writer (b. 1851)

== February 12, 1925 (Thursday) ==
- The Belgian airline SABENA (Societé anonyme belge d'Exploitation de la Navigation aérienne) pioneered the first air travel between Europe and central Africa as aviators Edmond Thieffry, Léopold Roger and Joseph De Brycker succeeded in flying a Handley Page W8 F biplane from Brussels, capital of Belgium, to Léopoldville (now Kinshasa), capital of the Belgian Congo.
- U.S. President Calvin Coolidge signed the Federal Arbitration Act into law, allowing contractual facilitation of resolving private disputes through arbitration. The law excludes certain classes of workers involved in foreign or interstate commerce, such as longshoremen and railroad employees.
- Nikolai Golitsyn, the last Prime Minister of Imperial Russia prior to the October Revolution of 1917, was arrested by the Russian SFSR's secret police, the GPU, on suspicion of association with "counterrevolutionaries", and would be convicted and executed five months later.
- Thousands of miners around Dortmund stopped work as both a sympathy gesture for the victims of the Stein mine explosion and a protest against dangerous mining conditions.
- Born: Lev Naumov, Soviet Russian classical pianist and composer; in Rostov, Russian SFSR, Soviet Union (present-day Russia) (d. 2005)

== February 13, 1925 (Friday) ==
- The Sheikh Said rebellion by Kurdish nationalists broke out in southeastern Turkey as Sheikh Said led a sermon from his mosque at Dicle, urging independence after the Turkish republic had abolished the Ministry of Religion and Foundations.
- The Judiciary Act of 1925, also known as the Judge's Bill, was passed as an effort to reduce the workload of the Supreme Court of the United States.
- Died: Floyd Collins, 37, American cave explorer; died after 14 days of being trapped in what became Mammoth Cave National Park (b. 1887)

== February 14, 1925 (Saturday) ==
- Sheikh Said and his followers declared Diyarbekir as the capital of Kurdistan. The uprising was crushed by February 25.
- Paavo Nurmi ran another record-breaking race in Madison Square Garden by running two miles in 8 minutes 58.2 seconds.
- Died: Arnold W. Brunner, 67, American architect (b. 1857)

== February 15, 1925 (Sunday) ==
- The Walt Disney animated film short Alice Solves the Puzzle was released, introducing the character known as Pete.
- Willy Böckl of Austria won the Men's Competition of the World Figure Skating Championships in Vienna.
- The London Zoo announced it would install lights to cheer up the animals during London's foggy spells.
- Died: Duke Farrell, 58, American Major League Baseball player and 1891 American Association home run leader for the Boston Reds; died 10 days after undergoing abdominal surgery (b. 1866)

== February 16, 1925 (Monday) ==
- Rescue diggers in Sand Cave, Kentucky reached Floyd Collins at 2:45 in the afternoon and found him dead.
- Bavaria lifted the ban on the Nazi Party that was imposed after the Beer Hall Putsch.
- The All India Railwaymen's Federation trade union (AIRF) was founded by employees of British India's government-owned railway.
- Vitorino Guimarães became Prime Minister of Portugal, but his government would collapse after less than five months.
- Born:
  - Carlos Paredes, Portuguese musician known for his popular performances using the 12-string guitarra portuguesa; in Coimbra, Portugal (d. 2004)
  - Ed Emshwiller, American visual artist; as Edmund Emshwiller, in Lansing, Michigan, United States (d. 1990)
  - Evelyn G. Lowery, American civil rights activist; as Evelyn Gibson, in Memphis, Tennessee, United States (d. 2013)

== February 17, 1925 (Tuesday) ==
- Former British Prime Minister H.H. Asquith, who headed the government from 1908 to 1916, took his seat in the House of Lords as the Earl of Oxford and Asquith.
- The ashar, a tax on farm products that had been used in the Ottoman Empire for centuries, was abolished by the Republic of Turkey. Although the term literally meant "one tenth", the amount of agricultural produce turned over to the government varied depending on local law and on the time of crop, with the result that farmers would turn to alternative crops in order to be taxed at a lower rate.
- Fayzulla Xoʻjayev, who led the Bukharan People's Soviet Republic from 1920 to 1924, became the Chairman of the Uzbek Soviet Socialist Republic's Council of People's Commissars.
- Born:
  - Ron Goodwin, English film score composer and conductor; as Ronald Goodwin, in Plymouth, Devon, England (d. 2003)
  - Hal Holbrook, American actor, known for creating and performing Mark Twain Tonight!; as Harold Holbrook Jr., in Cleveland, Ohio, United States (d. 2021)

== February 18, 1925 (Wednesday) ==
- The historic Mayflower Hotel, nicknamed the "Hotel of Presidents" opened at 1127 Connecticut Avenue NW in Washington, D.C. As of 2024, it was the oldest continuously operating hotel in the U.S. capital.
- U.S. President Calvin Coolidge suggested that an international conference be held to set limits on the size of naval vessels.
- New Zealand's rugby union team defeated the visiting Canadian team from Victoria, British Columbia, 68 to 4, in Toulouse, France to complete a perfect 32–0 record in their 1924–25 tour of Britain, Ireland and France. New Zealand scored a total of 838 points with only 116 points scored against them.
- In a cricket match played in Melbourne, the English team defeated Australia in the 4th Test for their first win against the Australians since 1912.
- Born:
  - George Kennedy, American actor, winner of the Academy Award for Best Supporting Actor in 1967 for Cool Hand Luke; in New York City, United States (d. 2016)
  - Abdelsalam Majali, Jordanian physician and politician, served as the Prime Minister of Jordan from 1993 to 1995 and from 1997 to 1998; in Al-Karak, Emirate of Transjordan (present-day Jordan) (d. 2023)
  - Joe Lutz, American professional baseball player coach, first non-Japanese manager in Japanese professional baseball as manager of the Hiroshima Toyo Carp; as Rollin Joseph Lutz, in Keokuk, Iowa, United States (d. 2008)
- Died: James Lane Allen, 75, American novelist and short story writer (b. 1849)

== February 19, 1925 (Thursday) ==
- A revised International Opium Convention was signed in Geneva.
- The Karakalpak Autonomous Oblast, with a capital at Turtkul (now part of the Republic of Uzbekistan) was created in the Soviet Union as a homeland for the Karakalpaks ethnic minority. After briefly existing as one of the Autonomous Soviet Socialist Republics from 1932 to 1936, it would be abolished in 1936 and become part of the Uzbek SFSR.
- Born: Jindřich Feld, Czech composer; in Prague, Czechoslovakia (present-day Czech Republic) (d. 2007)

== February 20, 1925 (Friday) ==
- A mine explosion in Sullivan, Indiana killed 51 coal miners. Another 70 employees either escaped or were rescued.
- Born: Robert Altman, American filmmaker, best known for M*A*S*H (1970), The Long Goodbye (1973), California Split (1974), Popeye (1980), and The Company (2003); in Kansas City, Missouri, United States (d. 2006)

== February 21, 1925 (Saturday) ==
- Bulgarian Prime Minister Aleksandar Tsankov declared that a state of war existed throughout the country amid fighting between Bulgarian and Serbian irregulars attributed to communist agitators.
- The first issue of The New Yorker, dated February 21, 1925, was read by the public. The cover date of the issue, released earlier in the week, bore the later date based on publication industry standards of dating the cover ahead of time in order to avoid the appearance of being out of date.
- The Florenz Ziegfeld musical, Kid Boots, closed after 489 performances since its debut on Broadway on December 31, 1923.
- Born:
  - Sam Peckinpah, American film director and screenwriter known for The Wild Bunch and other films; as David Samuel Peckinpah, in Fresno, California, United States (d. 1984)
  - Jack Ramsay, American professional basketball coach and inductee to the Naismith Memorial Basketball Hall of Fame, lead the NBA's Portland Trail Blazers to the 1977 NBA championship and was later a TV and radio broadcaster for ESPN; as John Ramsay, in Philadelphia, United States (d. 2014)
  - Richard Turner-Warwick, British urologist; in London, England (d. 2020)
  - Tom Gehrels, Dutch-born American astronomer; as Anton Marie Jacob Gehrels, in Haarlemmermeer, Netherlands (d. 2011)

== February 22, 1925 (Sunday) ==
- The State Great Khural, the unicameral parliament of the new Mongolian People's Republic, approved a monetary reform to replace its currency, the existing "Mongolian dollar", the yanchaan, with a new currency issued by the Bank, the tögrög, which would be introduced at the end of the year on December 9.
- The Chamber of Deputies in France voted against keeping a French embassy in the Vatican.
- The Polish Ice Hockey Federation (Polski Związek Hokeja na Lodzie or PZHL) was founded at a meeting in Warsaw representatives of the four Warsaw teams, Polonia, AZS, Warszawianka and Towarzystwo Łyżwiarskie.
- American film actor Gary Cooper appeared in his first film, The Trail Rider, albeit as a stunt rider, but soon got his first screen credit in the movie Tricks.
- Born:
  - Carl W. Helstrom, American theoretical physicist specializing in quantum information theory and discoverer of the Helstrom measurement; in Easton, Pennsylvania, United States (d. 2013)
  - Alice Mürer Siem, Norwegian ballet dancer; in Bærum, Norway (d. 2002)
- Died:
  - Joaquim José Machado, 77, Portuguese military officer and politician, served as the colonial governors of Mozambique from 1890 to 1891 and of Portuguese India from 1897 to 1900 (b. 1847)
  - Nina Salaman, 47, British Jewish poet and feminist, known for her translations of Hebrew language texts into English; died of colorectal cancer (b. 1877)

== February 23, 1925 (Monday) ==
- Four months after being stripped of all of his imperial titles and privileges as the former Emperor of China, Puyi accepted an offer by the Japanese Empire to receive protection from his enemies, and left the Chinese capital of Beijing on a train bound for Tianjin.
- The film Lady of the Night, starring Norma Shearer, was released.
- Born:
  - William B. Keene, American attorney and judge who served on the Los Angeles County Superior Court, and later played the judge on the syndicated TV show Divorce Court for nine seasons; in Youngstown, Ohio, United States (d. 2018)
  - Marion Fahey, American educator and superintendent of the Boston Public Schools during the Boston desegregation busing crisis of 1975; in Worcester, Massachusetts, United States (d. 2022)
- Died:
  - Sam Berger, 40, American heavyweight boxer and boxing promoter, won the first Olympic gold medal in heavyweight boxing in 1904, and was later the promoter and manager for James J. Jeffries; died after a year-long illness (b. 1884)
  - Dr. Kate Waller Barrett, 68, American physician and social reformer, founded and led the National Florence Crittenton Mission (b. 1857)

== February 24, 1925 (Tuesday) ==
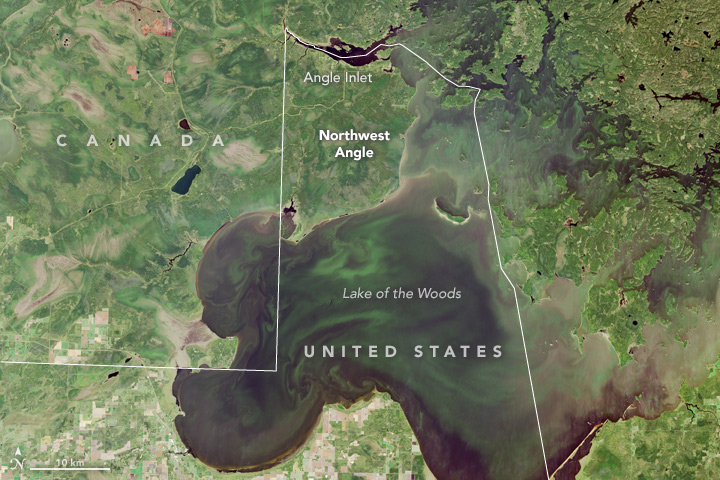
Minnesota's "Northwest Angle"

- The United States and Canada signed the Lake of the Woods Convention and Protocol, defining the lake's boundary line more accurately, regulating its water level, and arranging for the settlement of port damages caused by overflowing that arose from work done on the Canadian side. The agreement confirmed the U.S. ownership of the geographical anomaly known as the Northwest Angle, a landlocked 123.09 square miles (318.8 km^{2}) area of the U.S. state of Minnesota that is bordered by the Canadian provinces of Manitoba and Ontario, but not by the rest of Minnesota. Its population would be 149 at the time of the 2010 U.S. census, mostly in the town of Angle Inlet, Minnesota, and it is primarily occupied by Ojibwe (or Chippewa) American Indians.
- Germany's President Friedrich Ebert underwent an emergency appendectomy performed by August Bier, one of the foremost surgeons in Germany.
- Born:
  - Bud Day, U.S. Air Force pilot and recipient of the Medal of Honor and the Air Force Cross, prisoner of war for more than five years during the Vietnam War; as George Everette Day, in Sioux City, Iowa, United States (d. 2013)
  - Lynn Chandnois, American professional football player, 1952 NFL Player of the Year; in Fayette, Michigan, United States (d. 2011)
- Died: Hjalmar Branting, 64, Swedish statesman and diplomat, served as the Prime Minister of Sweden and recipient of the Nobel Peace Prize (b. 1860)

== February 25, 1925 (Wednesday) ==
- The first "electrical recording" of a phonographic record, using a method licensed from Western Electric by Columbia Phonograph Company, was made by Art Gillham as he and his orchestra used microphones to perform "You May Be Lonesome" and a more popular recording, "Hesitation Blues".
- The Guna Revolution broke out in Panama when chiefs Nele Kantule and Ologintipipilele led attacks on police on the islands of Tupile and Ukupseni in an attempt to create their own nation. After a few days, a U.S. Navy cruiser arrived and a truce was negotiated to make the San Blas Islands autonomous within Panamanian rule.
- The Imperial Iranian Air Force became operational as Iran's first military pilots began flying.
- Born: Shehu Shagari, Nigerian politician who was the first democratically elected president of Nigeria, served as the 6th President of Nigeria from 1979 to 1983; in Shagari, Colonial Nigeria (present-day Nigeria) (d. 2018)
- Died:
  - Louis Feuillade, 52, French filmmaker (b. 1873)
  - Medill McCormick, 47, American businessman and politician, served as the U.S. Senator from Illinois from 1919 until his death; committed suicide in his hotel room at the Hamilton Hotel in Washington, D.C., one week before his term was set to expire after losing his bid for re-election (b. 1877)

== February 26, 1925 (Thursday) ==
- A major Wahhabi raid was carried out across the border of Transjordan.
- The Victor Talking Machine Company, which had used acoustical recording on its discs, recorded "A Miniature Concert" performed at a gathering of eight of its most popular artists, including Billy Murray, Henry Burr, Frank Croxton, Monroe Silver, and Rudy Wiedoeft.
- The Soviet–Japanese Basic Convention, signed in January, took effect with the exchange of ratifications at a meeting hosted by China.
- Born: Everton Weekes, Barbados professional cricketer; in Saint Michaels, Barbados (d. 2020)

== February 27, 1925 (Friday) ==
The new Nazi flag

- No longer outlawed, Germany's Nazi Party was officially re-established at a convention in the same hall in Munich where Adolf Hitler had launched his failed putsch. With its launch, the organization called itself the Nationalsozialistische Freiheitspartei ("National Socialist Freedom Party"). Hitler made his first speech since his release from prison to a packed audience of over 4,000 in the hall as another 1,000 stood outside.
- The explosion of 38 tons of dynamite at Caju, Rio de Janeiro in Brazil's Guanabara Bay killed as many as 50 people but far less than what had originally been reported by Brazilian officials. While the first reports were that 621 people were killed and 1,379 injured, a figure repeated nearly one century later online, the announced death toll was revised a few days later to "less than fifty."

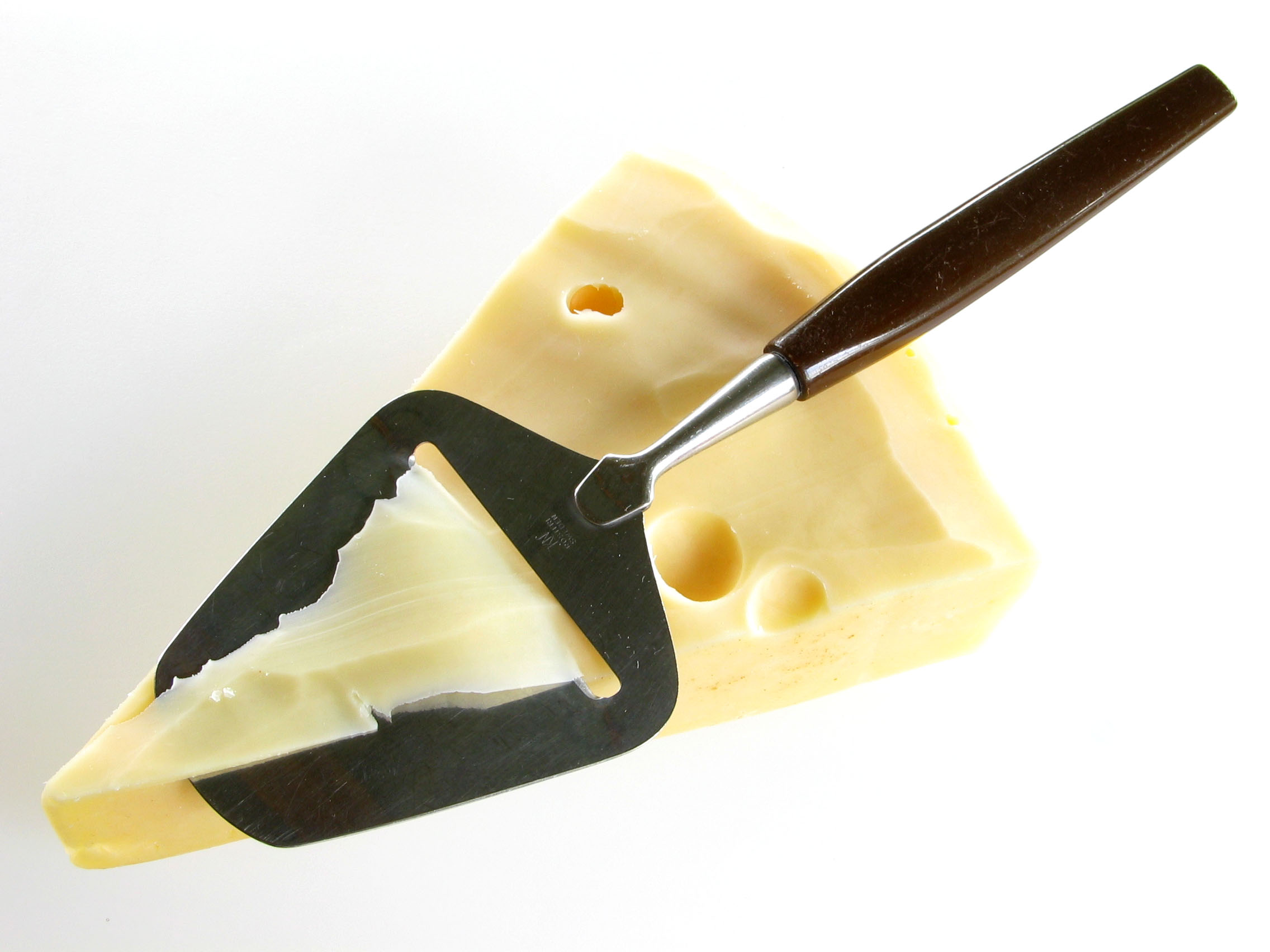
An Ostehøvel

- Norwegian carpenter and inventor Thor Bjørklund received the patent for the cheese slicer using the principles of the hand plane, with the blade located inside a slot in the utensil an "Ostehøvel", Norwegian for cheese (oste) and the plane (høvel).
- Born:
  - Shoichiro Toyoda, Japanese business executive and chairman of the Board of Toyota Motor Corporation from 1992 to 1999; in Nagoya, Empire of Japan (present-day Japan) (d. 2023)
  - Shyama Charan Shukla, Indian politician, served three times as the Chief Minister of Madhya Pradesh from 1969 to 1972, 1975-1977 and 1989-1990; in Raipur, Central Provinces, British India (present-day Chhattisgarh, India) (d. 2007)
  - Samuel Dash, American lawyer, served as chief counsel for the Senate Watergate Committee; in Camden, New Jersey, United States (d. 2004)

== February 28, 1925 (Saturday) ==
- A 6.2 magnitude earthquake, one of the most powerful measured in Canada in the 20th century, struck in the province of Quebec at 9:19 in the morning local time, with an epicenter in the St. Lawrence River near La Malbaie and caused damage in villages along the shores in the areas of Charlevoix and Kamouraska, but no major casualties.
- At Simferopol, the Central Executive Committee and Council of People's Commissars of the Crimean Autonomous Socialist Soviet Republic, led by Veli Ibraimov voted to prohibit Jewish resettlement in Crimea. The resolution failed to stop the Soviet Union's efforts to relocate Soviet Jews to Crimea.
- Born:
  - James E. Burke, American businessman who served as the CEO of Johnson & Johnson from 1976 to 1989; in Rutland, Vermont, United States (d. 2012)
  - Peter Baxendell, British businessman and oil company executive who served as Chairman of the Royal Dutch Shell Group oil corporation from 1982 to 1985; in Runcorn, Cheshire, England (d. 2025)
  - Harry H. Corbett, English comedian and television actor who starred as Harold Steptoe in the BBC sitcom Steptoe and Son from 1962 to 1965 and 1970 to 1974; in Rangoon, British Burma (present-day Myanmar) (d. 1982)
- Died:
  - Friedrich Ebert, 54, German politician, served as the President of Germany from 1919 until his death; died of peritonitis four days after an emergency appendectomy (b. 1871)
  - Charles Bingham Penrose, 63, American gynecologist known for inventing the Penrose drain; died of a heart attack (b. 1862)
