= Trendelenburg operation =

Surgical procedure to treat varicose veins

- Specialty: Phlebologists

A Trendelenburg operation is a surgical procedure conducted for the treatment of varicose veins. It is the juxtafemoral flush ligation of the great saphenous vein to the femoral vein.

== Procedure ==
An oblique incision is made in the groin, over the femoral artery and extending 4 cm medially. The great saphenous vein is exposed and the common femoral and subsartorial veins are identified before dividing. The vein is ligated close to the junction with of the femoral vein. If the ligation is distal from the saphenofemoral junction, it will leave out small tributaries which may later cause recurrence of varicosities. Additionally, there is risk of a blind loop formation, which can be a potential space for the formation of thrombus. The rate of recurrence in this surgical procedure is high.
