= Nora Houfová =

Austrian actress (1924–2024)

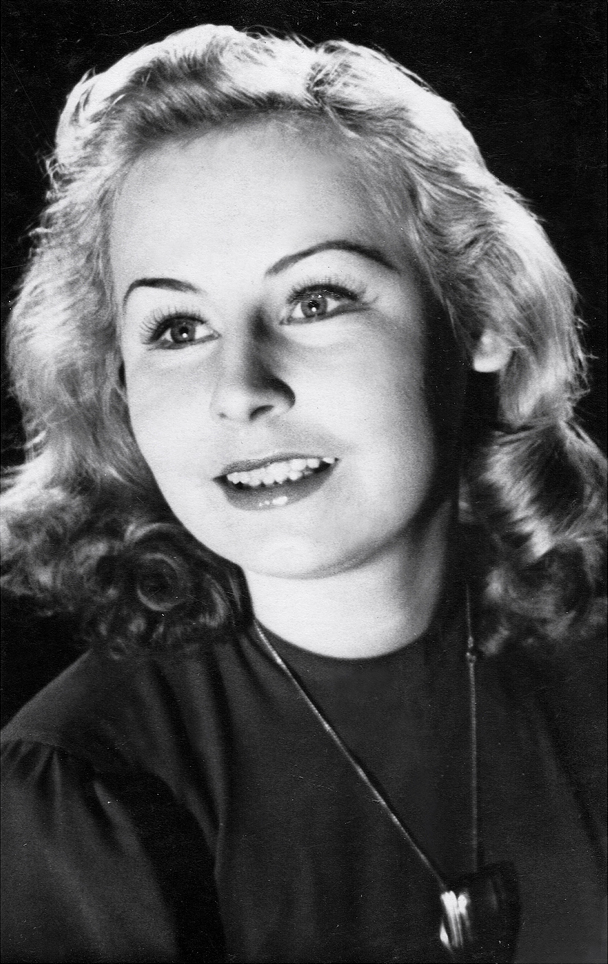
- Born: Eleonore Ujka; 13 December 1924; Vienna, Austria
- Died: 29 May 2024 (aged 99); Vienna, Austria
- Other names: Nora Houf
- Education: Max Reinhardt Seminar
- Occupation: Actress
- Years active: 1954–2011
- Spouse: Jaroslav Houf (m. 1948; div. 1957) Vladimir Car (m. 1964)
- Children: 2

Eleonore Ujka (13 December 1924 – 29 May 2024), better known as Nora Houfová or Nora Houf, was an Austrian actress of films and theatre, mostly appeared in supporting roles.

== Early life ==
Nora was born in Vienna on 13 December 1924. She spent her youth in Greece, where her father Karel Ujka ran the Austrian branch of the Wertheim company operating the construction of elevators. In September 1939, the Ujkas returned to Vienna and Nora enrolled to study acting at the University of Music and Dramatic Arts, Institute for Drama and Drama Direction Max Reinhardt Seminar, where she then studied in the years 40s and 43s. In 1943, Nora's father was sent to Karlovy Vary to keep elevators in operation in individual buildings. The spa town was then transformed into a military infirmary of the German army. Nora was fluent in French, English, German and Czech.

== Career ==
In 1954, she joined the German troupe of the State Touring Theater in Prague-Hloubětín and worked there until its disbandment in 1962. At that time, the troupe toured the border region, the former Sudetenland, where it played for German-speaking residents. Nora's colleagues were, the later well-known director Otto Ševčík, Jindřich Narenta, František Pálka, Lenka Birková and others.

In 1960 she played in Jiří Krejčík's film Higher Principle and in 1962 in Jiří Lehovec's drama Mykoin PH 510. After returning to Vienna in May 1963, she continued to work in theater and film. In 1999, she played a supporting role in one episode of the crime TV series Tatort. She was active in the theater until 2011.

== Personal life ==
In Karlovy Vary Nora met the photographer Jaroslav Houf and married him in November 1948. The wedding was conceived in a grand style with the participation of the townspeople, which did not quite fit in with the newly introduced order. Jaroslav continued to work as a private photographer and refused the offered position of chairman of the Fotografia cooperative, which was established in 1950. Two sons were born to the couple, Kristian in 1949 and Marcel two years later. In the turbulent post-February period, the peculiar photographer Houf became uncomfortable, in December 1953 he was arrested and in April 1954 he was sentenced to four and a half years of labor in the mines in the prison in Rtyn in Podkrkonoší. His sentence was later reduced, and after his release in 1957, the Houfs divorced.

In 1964, Nora married Vladimír Švancar, after changing his last name, which was not very suitable for a German-speaking environment to Vladimír Car. Her son Marcel died in 2022 She retired from acting in 2018 and resided in Vienna, where she died on 29 May 2024, at the age of 99.
