= Guimarães (surname) =

Guimarães ([gima'ɾɐ᷉j᷉ʃ] or [gima'ɾɐ᷉j᷉s] is a Portuguese toponymic surname associated with the places named Guimarães. The name is derived from the Germanic given name Wigmar. In may also be a surname of Sephardic Jews (Hebrew: גימארייס) from Guimarães.. Notable people with the surname include:

- Agberto Guimarães (born 1957), Brazilian middle-distance runner
- Alencar Guimarães (1865–1940), Brazilian lawyer and politician
- Alexandre Guimarães (born 1959), Brazilian-Costa Rican football player and manager
- Antônio Guimarães (1900–1975), Brazilian sports shooter
- Artur Victor Guimarães (born 1998), Brazilian footballer
- Bárbara Guimarães (born 1973), Portuguese TV presenter and journalist
- Bernardo Guimarães (1825–1884), Brazilian poet and novelist
- Bruno Guimarães (born 1997), Brazilian footballer
- Carlos Guimarães (1898–?), Portuguese footballer
- Daniel Guimarães (born 1987), Brazilian footballer
- Darcy Guimarães (1915–1981), Brazilian hurdler
- Djalma Guimarães (1894–1973), Brazilian geochemist
- Durval Guimarães (born 1935), Brazilian sport shooter
- Edson Izidoro Guimarães (born 1957), Brazilian serial killer
- Elina Guimarães (1904–1991), Portuguese feminist and writer
- Flávio Guimarães (born 1963), Brazilian composer, harmonica player and singer
- Gabriela Guimarães (born 1994), Brazilian volleyball player
- Getúlio Teixeira Guimarães (1937–2020), Brazilian Roman Catholic priest
- Gustavo Guimarães (born 1994), Brazilian water polo player
- Hélder Guimarães (born 1982), Portuguese magician and illusionist
- Ingrid Guimarães (born 1972), Brazilian actress
- Jonas Guimarães (born 1951), Brazilian politician
- José Guimarães (disambiguation), multiple people
- Lúcia Guimarães (born 1957), Brazilian journalist
- Luiz Fernando Guimarães (born 1949), Brazilian actor
- Manuel Guimarães (1915–1975), Portuguese filmmaker
- Marcelo Guimarães (born 1983), Brazilian mixed martial artist
- Natália Guimarães (born 1984), Brazilian actress
- Nilo Guimarães (born 1954), São Toméan businessman and politician
- Nilo Guimarães (basketball) (born 1957), Brazilian basketball player
- Oriovisto Guimarães (born 1945), Brazilian politician
- Oswaldo Guimarães (born 1989), Brazilian handball player
- Paulo Sérgio Guimarães da Silva (born 1971), Brazilian serial killer
- Pedro Guimarães (born 1971), Brazilian economist
- Philippe Guimarães (born 1991), Brazilian footballer
- Plauto Guimarães (1925–1972), Brazilian Olympic swimmer
- Regina Guimarães (born 1957), Portuguese poet, playwright, stage director and lyricist
- Ricardo Cardoso Guimarães (born 1959), Brazilian basketball player
- Ricardo Guimarães (born 1995), Portuguese footballer
- Ricardo Guimarães (athlete) (1909–1974), Brazilian sprinter
- Rodolfo Guimarães (1866–1918), Portuguese army officer and historian of mathematics
- Serafim Guimarães (born 1934), Portuguese physician and pharmacologist
- Sonia Guimarães (born 1957), Brazilian professor
- Suely Guimarães (born 1957), Brazilian paralympic athlete
- Tuca Guimarães (born 1973), Brazilian football manager
- Ubiratan Guimarães (1943–2006), Brazilian politician and colonel
- Ulysses Guimarães (1916–1992), Brazilian politician and lawyer
- Vitorino Guimarães (1876–1957), Portuguese economist and politician
- Wálter Guimarães (1913–1979), Brazilian footballer
- Wesley Guimarães (born 1995), Brazilian actor
