= History of catecholamine research =

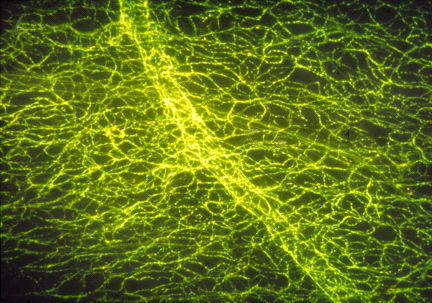
Nerve fibers in the iris with noradrenaline

The catecholamines are a group of neurotransmitters composed of the endogenous substances dopamine, noradrenaline (norepinephrine), and adrenaline (epinephrine), as well as numerous artificially synthesized compounds such as isoprenaline - an anti-bradycardiac medication. Their investigation constitutes a major chapter in the history of physiology, biochemistry, and pharmacology. Adrenaline was the first hormone extracted from an endocrine gland and obtained in pure form, before the word hormone was coined. Adrenaline was also the first hormone whose structure and biosynthesis was discovered. Second to acetylcholine, adrenaline and noradrenaline were some of the first neurotransmitters discovered, and the first intercellular biochemical signals to be found in intracellular vesicles. The β-adrenoceptor gene was the first G protein-coupled receptor to be cloned.

== Adrenaline in the Adrenal Medulla ==
=== Forerunners ===
British physician and physiologist Henry Hyde Salter (1823–1871) included a chapter on treatment by "stimulants", in a book on asthma which was first published in 1860. He noted the benefits of strong coffee, presumably because it dispelled sleep, which favored asthma. Even more impressive to him, however, was the response to "strong mental emotion":

The cure of asthma by violent emotion is more sudden and complete than by any other remedy whatever; indeed, I know few things more striking and curious in the whole history of therapeutics. The cure takes no time; it is instantaneous, the intersect paroxysm ceases on the instant.

The retrospective interpretation is that the "cure" was due to the release of adrenaline from the adrenal glands.

At the same time, the French physician Alfred Vulpian also made discoveries about the adrenal medulla. Material scraped from the adrenal medulla turned green when ferric chloride was added. This did not occur with the adrenal cortex nor with any other tissue. Vulpian even came to the insight that the substance entered "le torrent circulator" ("the circulatory torrent"), as blood from the adrenal veins did give the ferric chloride reaction.

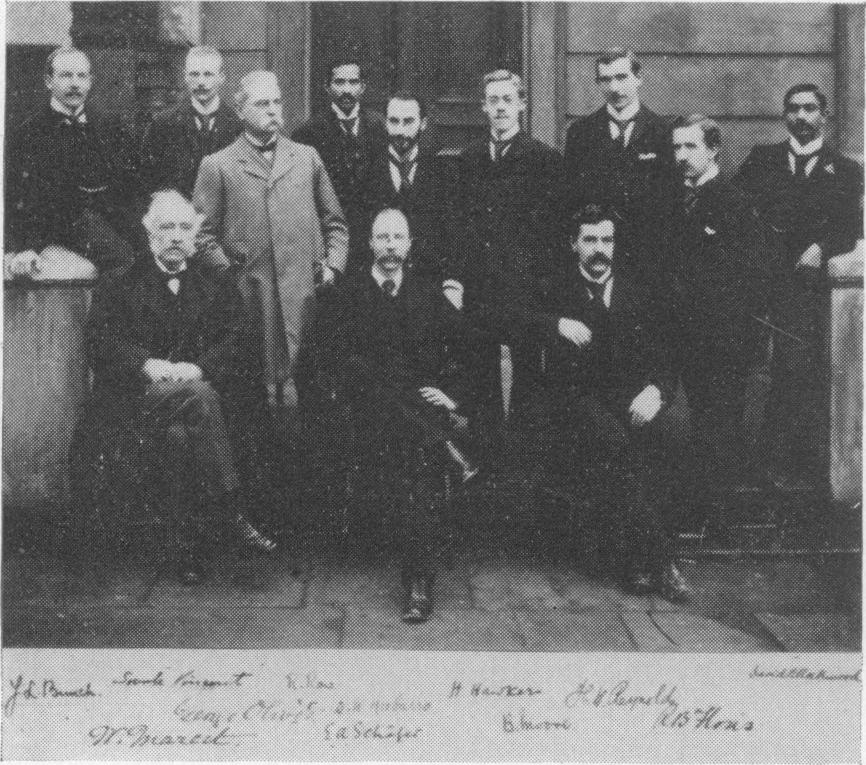
Members of University College London around 1895. Schäfer in middle of front row, Oliver in light coat.

In the early 1890s, in the laboratory of Oswald Schmiedeberg in Strasbourg, the German pharmacologist Carl Jacob (1857–1944) studied the relationship between the adrenal glands and the intestine. Electrical stimulation of the vagus nerve or injection of muscarine elicited peristalsis. This peristalsis was promptly abolished by electrical stimulation of the adrenal glands. The experiment has been called "the first indirect demonstration of the role of the adrenal medulla as an endocrine organ and actually a more sophisticated demonstration of the adrenal medullary function than the classic study of Oliver and Schafer". While this may be true, Jacob did not envisage a chemical signal secreted into the blood to influence distant organs, the actual function of a hormone, but nerves running from the adrenals to the gut, "Hemmungsbahnen für die Darmbewegung".

=== Oliver and Schäfer 1893–1894 ===
George Oliver was a physician practicing in the spa town of Harrogate in North Yorkshire while Edward Albert Schäfer was Professor of Physiology at University College London. In 1918, he prefixed the surname of his physiology teacher, William Sharpey, to his own to become Edward Albert Sharpey Schafer. The canonical story, told by Henry Hallett Dale, who worked at University College London from 1902 to 1904, runs as follows:

Dr. Oliver, I was told I had a liking and a ′flair′ for the invention of simple appliances, with which observations and experiments could be made on the human subject. Dr Oliver had invented a small instrument with which he claimed to be able to measure, through the unbroken skin, the diameter of a living artery, such as the radial artery at the wrist. He appears to have used his family in his experiments, and a young son was the subject of a series, in which Dr Oliver measured the diameter of the radial artery, and observed the effect upon it of injecting extracts of various animal glands under the skin. … We may picture, then, Professor Schafer, in the old physiological laboratory at University College, … finishing an experiment of some kind, in which he was recording the arterial blood pressure of an anaesthetized dog. … To him enters Dr Oliver, with the story of the experiments on his boy, and, in particular, with the statement that injection under the skin of a glycerin extract from calf's suprarenal gland was followed by a definite narrowing of the radial artery. Professor Schafer is said to have been entirely skeptical, and to have attributed the observation to self-delusion. … He can hardly be blamed, I think; knowing even what we now know about the action of this extract, which of us would be prepared to believe that injecting it under a boy's skin would cause his radial artery to become measurably more slender? Dr Oliver, however, is persistent; he … suggests that, at least, it will do no harm to inject into the circulation, through a vein, a little of the suprarenal extract, which he produces from his pocket. So Professor Schafer makes the injection, expecting a triumphant demonstration of nothing, and finds himself standing ′like some watcher of the skies, when a new planet swims into his ken,′ watching the mercury rise in the manometer with amazing rapidity and to an astounding height.

Despite this tale being reiterated many times, it is not beyond doubt. Dale himself said that it was handed down at University College and showed some surprise that the constriction of the radial artery was measurable. Of Oliver's descendants, none recalled experiments on his son. Dale's report of subcutaneous injections contradicts the concerned parties. Oliver: "During the winter of 1893–4, while prosecuting an inquiry as to … agents that vary the caliber of … arteries … I found that the administration by the mouth of a glycerin extract of the adrenals of the sheep and calf produced a marked constrictive action on the arteries." Schafer: "In the autumn of 1893 there called upon me in my laboratory at University College a gentleman who was personally unknown to me. … I found that my visitor was Dr. George Oliver, [who] was desirous of discussing with me the results which he had been obtaining from the exhibition by the mouth of extracts from certain animal tissues, and the effects which these had in his hands produced upon the blood vessels of man." Systemic effects of orally given adrenaline are highly unlikely, so details of the canonical text may be legend.

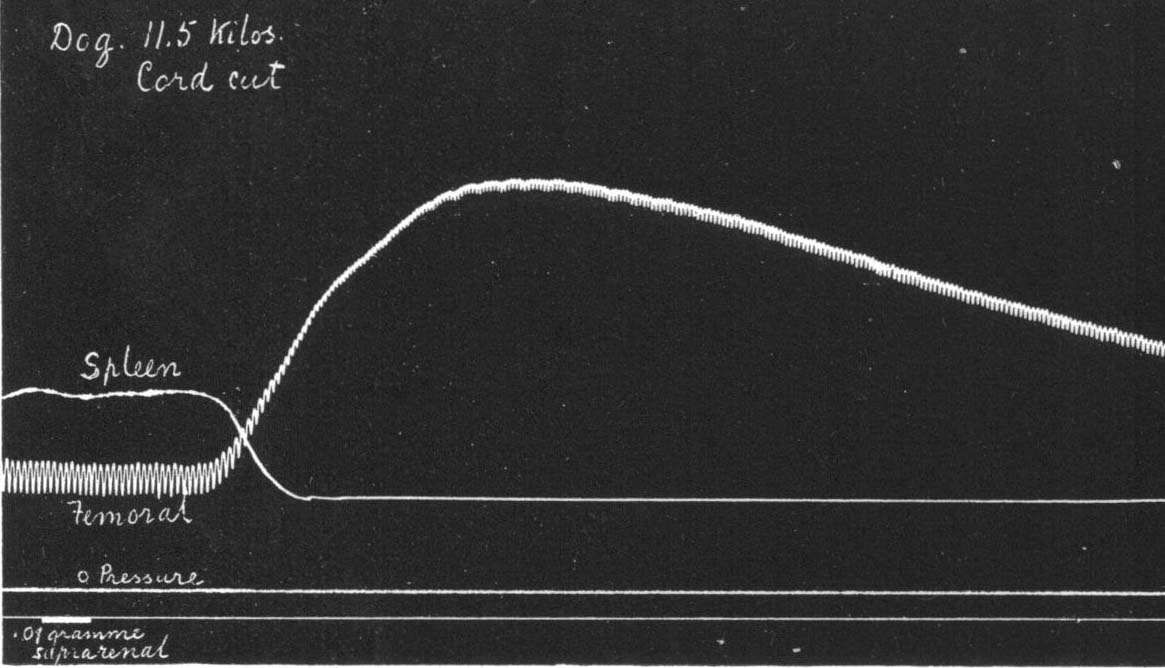
Experiment by Oliver und Schäfer: an adrenal extract increases the blood pressure and contracts the spleen.

On March 10, 1894, Oliver and Schafer presented their findings to the Physiological Society in London. A 47-page account followed a year later, in the style of the time without statistics, but with precise description of many individual experiments and 25 recordings on kymograph smoked drums, showing, besides the blood pressure increase, reflex bradycardia and contraction of the spleen. "It appears to be established as the result of these investigations that the suprarenal capsules are to be regarded although ductless, as strictly secreting glands. The material which they form and which is found, at least in its fully active condition, only in the medulla of the gland, produces striking physiological effects upon the muscular tissue generally, and especially upon that of the heart and arteries. Its action is produced mainly if not entirely by direct action."

The reports created a sensation. Oliver was fast to try adrenal extracts in patients, orally again and rather indiscriminately, from Addison's disease, hypotension ("loss of vasomotor tone"), Diabetes mellitus and Diabetes insipidus to Graves' disease ("exophthalmic goiter"). It seems he adhered to contemporary ideas of organotherapy, believing that powerful substances existed in tissues and ought to be discovered for medicinal use. He immediately went on to extract the pituitary gland and, again with Schafer, discovered vasopressin. In 1903 adrenaline, meanwhile purified, was first used in asthma. The use was based, not on the bronchodilator effect, which was discovered later, but on the vasoconstrictor effect, which was hoped to alleviate the "turgidity of the bronchial mucosa"—presumably vascular congestion and edema. Also as of 1903, adrenaline was added to local anesthetic solutions. The surgeon Heinrich Braun in Leipzig showed that it prolonged the anesthesia at the injection site and simultaneously reduced "systemic" effects elsewhere in the body.

=== Independent discoverers ===
A year after Oliver and Schafer, Władysław Szymonowicz (1869–1939) and Napoleon Cybulski of the Jagiellonian University in Kraków reported similar findings and conclusions. They found that blood from the adrenal veins caused hypertension when injected intravenously in a recipient dog, whereas blood from other veins did not, demonstrating that the adrenal pressor substance was in fact secreted into the blood and confirming Vulpian. The Polish authors freely acknowledged the priority of Oliver and Schäfer, and the British authors acknowledged the independence of Szymonowicz and Cybulski. The main difference was in the location of the action: to the periphery by Oliver and Schäfer but, erroneously, to the central nervous system by Szymonowicz and Cybulski.

Another year later, the US-American ophthalmologist William Bates, perhaps motivated like Oliver, instilled adrenal extracts into the eye and found that "the conjunctiva of the globe and lids whitened in a few minutes", correctly explained the effect by vasoconstriction, and administered the extracts in various eye diseases.

== Chemistry ==
In 1897, John Jacob Abel in Baltimore partially purified adrenal extracts to what he called "epinephrin", and Otto von Fürth in Strasbourg to what he called "Suprarenin". The Japanese chemist Jōkichi Takamine, who had set up his own laboratory in New York, invented an isolation procedure and obtained it in pure crystal form in 1901, and arranged for Parke-Davis to market it as "Adrenalin", spelt without the terminal "e". In 1903, natural adrenaline was found to be optically active and levorotary. In 1905 synthesis of the racemate was achieved by Friedrich Stolz at Hoechst AG in Höchst (Frankfurt am Main) and by Henry Drysdale Dakin at the University of Leeds. In 1906 the chemical structure was elucidated by Ernst Joseph Friedmann (1877–1956) in Strasbourg, and in 1908 the dextrorotary enantiomer was shown to be almost inactive by Arthur Robertson Cushney (1866–1926) at the University of Michigan, leading him to conclude that "the 'receptive substance' affected by adrenalin" is able to discriminate between the optical isomers and, hence, itself optically active. Overall, 32 designations have been coined, of which "adrenaline", preferred in the United Kingdom, and "epinephrine", preferred in the United States, persist as generic names in the scientific literature.

== Adrenaline as a transmitter ==
A new chapter was opened when Max Lewandowsky in 1899 in Berlin observed that adrenal extracts acted on the smooth muscle of the eye and orbit of cats—such as the iris dilator muscle and nictitating membrane—in the same way as sympathetic nerve stimulation. The correspondence was extended by John Newport Langley and, under his supervision, Thomas Renton Elliott in Cambridge. In four papers in volume 31, 1904, of the Journal of Physiology Elliott described the similarities organ by organ. His hypothesis stands in the abstract of a presentation to the Physiological Society of May 21, 1904, a little over ten years after Oliver and Schafer's presentation: "Adrenalin does not excite sympathetic ganglia when applied to them directly, as does nicotine. Its effective action is localized at the periphery. I find that even after complete denervation, whether of three days' or ten months' duration, the plain muscle of the dilatator pupillae will respond to adrenalin, and that with greater rapidity and longer persistence than does the iris whose nervous relations are uninjured. Therefore, it cannot be than adrenalin excites any structure derived from, and dependent for its persistence on, the peripheral neurone. ... The point at which the stimulus of the chemical excitant is received, and transformed into what may cause the change of tension of the muscle fiber, is perhaps a mechanism developed out of the muscle cell in response to its union with the synapsing sympathetic fiber, the function of which is to receive and transform the nervous impulse. "Adrenalin" might then be the chemical stimulant liberated on each occasion when the impulse arrives at the periphery." The abstract is the "birth certificate" of chemical neurotransmission. Elliott was never so explicit again. It seems he was discouraged by the lack of a favorable response from his seniors, Langley in particular, and a few years later he left physiological research.

The 'birth certificate' of chemical neurotransmission

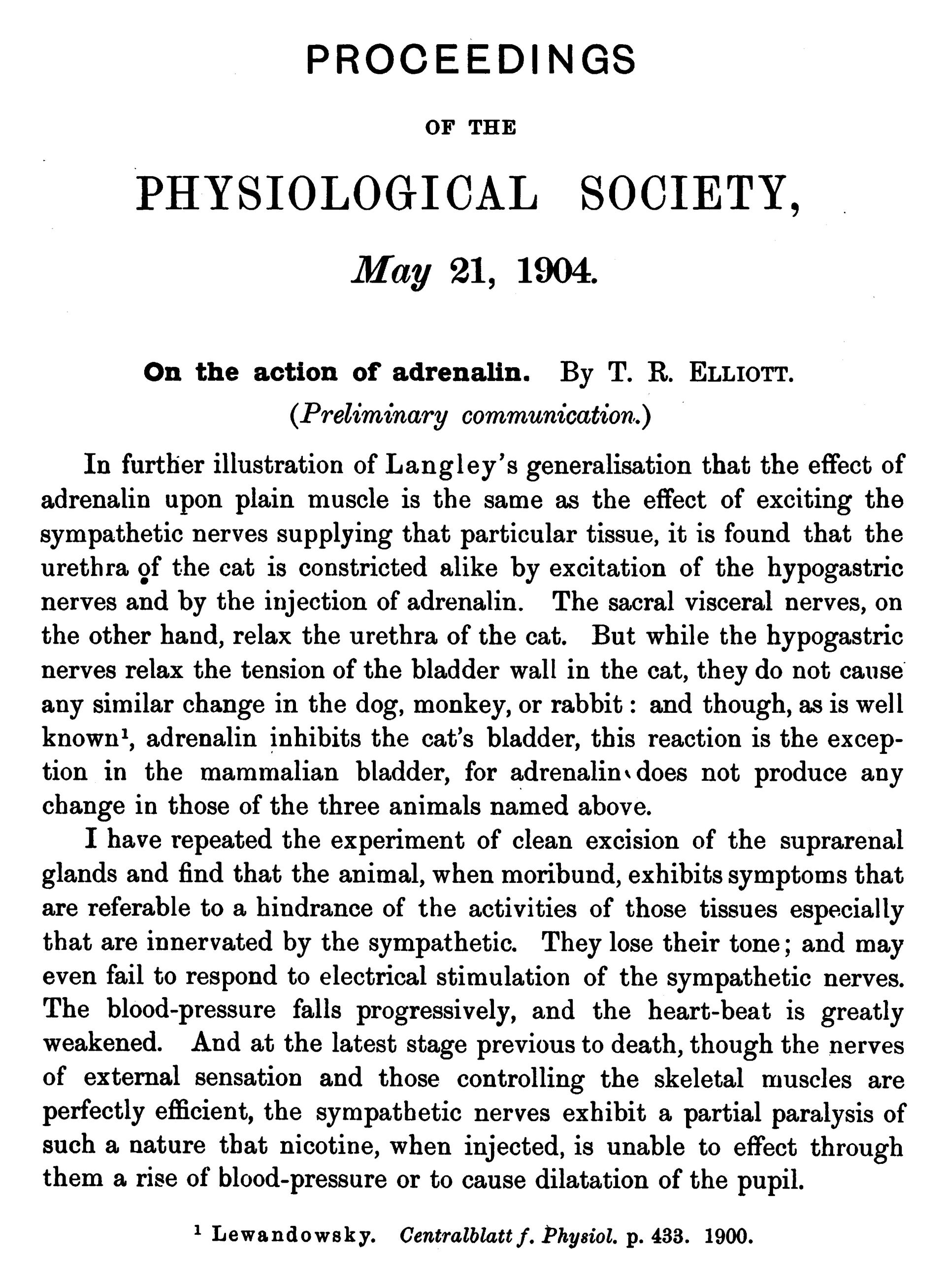

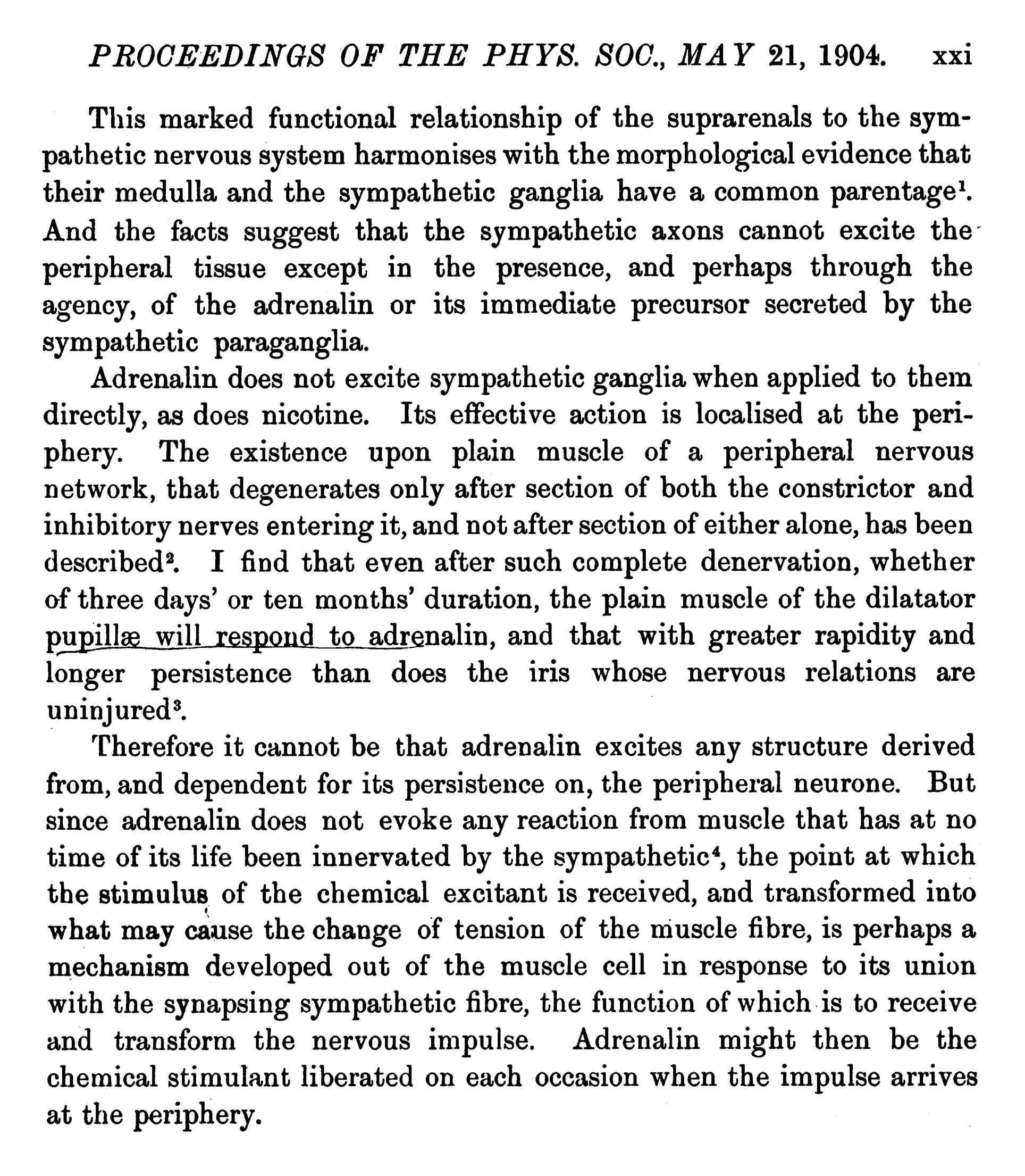

The breakthrough for chemical neurotransmission came when, in 1921, Otto Loewi in Graz demonstrated the "humorale Übertragbarkeit der Herznervenwirkung" in amphibians. Vagusstoff transmitted inhibition from the vagus nerves, and Acceleransstoff transmitted stimulation from the sympathetic nerves to the heart. Loewi took some years to commit himself with respect to the nature of the Stoffe, but in 1926 he was sure that Vagusstoff was acetylcholine, writing in 1936 "I no longer hesitate to identify the Sympathicusstoff with adrenaline."

He was correct in the latter statement. In most amphibian organs including the heart, the concentration of adrenaline far exceeds that of noradrenaline, and adrenaline is indeed the main transmitter. In mammals, however, difficulties arose. In a comprehensive structure-activity study of adrenaline-like compounds, Dale and the chemist George Barger in 1910 found that Elliott's hypothesis assumed a stricter parallelism between the effects of sympathetic nerve impulses and adrenaline than actually existed. For example, sympathetic impulses shared with adrenaline contractile effects in the trigone but not relaxant effects in the fundus of the cat's urinary bladder. In this respect, "amino-ethanol-catechol"—noradrenaline—mimicked sympathetic nerves more closely than adrenaline did. The Harvard Medical School physiologist Walter Bradford Cannon, who had popularized the idea of a sympatho-adrenal system preparing the body for fight and flight, and his colleague Arturo Rosenblueth developed an elaborate but "queer" theory of two sympathins, sympathin E (excitatory) and sympathin I (inhibitory). The Belgian pharmacologist Zénon Bacq as well as Canadian and US-American pharmacologists between 1934 and 1938 suggested that noradrenaline might be the—or at least one—postganglionic sympathetic transmitter. However, nothing definite was brought to light till after the war. In the meantime, Dale created a terminology that has since imprinted the thinking of neuroscientists: nerve cells should be named after their transmitter, i.e. cholinergic if the transmitter was "a substance like acetylcholine", and adrenergic if it was "some substance like adrenaline".

In 1936, the year when Loewi accepted adrenaline as the (amphibian) sympathetic transmitter, Dale and Loewi received the Nobel Prize in Physiology or Medicine "for their discoveries relating to chemical transmission of nerve impulses".

== Formation and destruction ==
In a review of earlier work on catecholamine biosynthesis, German-British biochemist Hermann Blaschko (1900–1993) wrote: "Our modern knowledge of the biosynthetic pathway for the catecholamines begins in 1939, with the publication of a paper by Peter Holtz and his colleagues: they described the presence in the guinea-pig kidneys of an enzyme that they called dopa decarboxylase, because it catalyzed the formation of dopamine and carbon dioxide from the amino acid L-dopa." The paper by Peter Holtz (1902–1970) and his coworkers referred to in that quote originated from the Institute of Pharmacology in Rostock. Already in that same year, both Blaschko at Cambridge and Holtz in Rostock predicted the entire sequence tyrosine → l-DOPA → oxytyramine = dopamine → noradrenaline → adrenaline. Edith Bülbring, who also had fled National Socialist racism in 1933, demonstrated methylation of noradrenaline to adrenaline in adrenal tissue in Oxford in 1949, and Julius Axelrod detected phenylethanolamine N-methyltransferase in Bethesda, Maryland in 1962. The two remaining enzymes, tyrosine hydroxylase and dopamine β-hydroxylase, were also characterized around 1960.

Even before contributing to the formation pathway, Blaschko had discovered a destruction mechanism. An enzyme tyramine oxidase described in 1928 also oxidized dopamine, noradrenaline and adrenaline. It was later named monoamine oxidase. This seemed to clarify the fate of the catecholamines in the body, but in 1956 Blaschko suggested that, because the oxidation was slow, "other mechanisms of inactivation … will be found to play an important part. Here is a gap in our knowledge which remains to be filled." Within a year, Axelrod narrowed the gap by showing that dopamine, noradrenaline and adrenaline were O-methylated by catechol-O-methyl transferase. To fill the gap completely, however, the role of membranes had to be appreciated.

== Noradrenaline ==
Thanks to Holtz and Blaschko it was clear that animals synthesized noradrenaline. What was needed to attribute a transmitter role to it was proof of its presence in tissues at effective concentrations and not only as a short-lived intermediate. On April 16, 1945, Ulf von Euler of Karolinska Institute in Stockholm, who had already discovered or co-discovered substance P and prostaglandins, submitted to Nature the first of a series of papers that gave this proof. After many bioassays and chemical assays on organ extracts he concluded that mammalian sympathetically innervated tissues as well as, in small amounts, the brain, but not the nerve-free placenta, contained noradrenaline and that noradrenaline was the sympathy of Cannon and Rosenblueth, the "physiological transmitter of adrenergic nerve action in mammals". Overflow of noradrenaline into the venous blood of the cat's spleen upon sympathetic nerve stimulation two years later bore out the conclusion. In amphibian hearts, on the other hand, the transmitter role of adrenaline was confirmed.

The war prevented Peter Holtz and his group in Rostock from being recognized side by side with von Euler as discoverers of the second catecholamine transmitter noradrenaline. Their approach was different. They sought for catecholamines in human urine and found a blood pressure-increasing material Urosympathin that they identified as a mixture of dopamine, noradrenaline and adrenaline. "As to the origin of Urosympathin we would like to suggest the following. Dopamine in urine is the fraction that was not consumed for the synthesis of sympathin E and I. … Sympathin E and I, i.e. noradrenaline and adrenaline, are liberated in the region of the sympathetic nerve endings when these are excited." The manuscript was received by Springer-Verlag in Leipzig on October 8, 1944. On October 15, the printing office in Braunschweig was destroyed by an airstrike. Publication was delayed to volume 204, 1947, of Naunyn-Schmiedebergs Archiv für Pharmakologie und Experimentelle Pathologie. Peter Holtz later used to cite the paper as "Holtz et al. 1944/47" or "Holtz, Credner and Kroneberg 1944/47".

Remembering his and Barger's structure-activity analysis of 1910, Dale wrote in 1953: "Doubtless I ought to have seen that nor-adrenaline might be the main transmitter—that Elliott's theory might be right in principle and faulty only in this detail. ... It is easy, of course, to be wise in the light of facts recently discovered; lacking them I failed to jump to the truth, and I can hardly claim credit for having crawled so near and then stopped short of it."

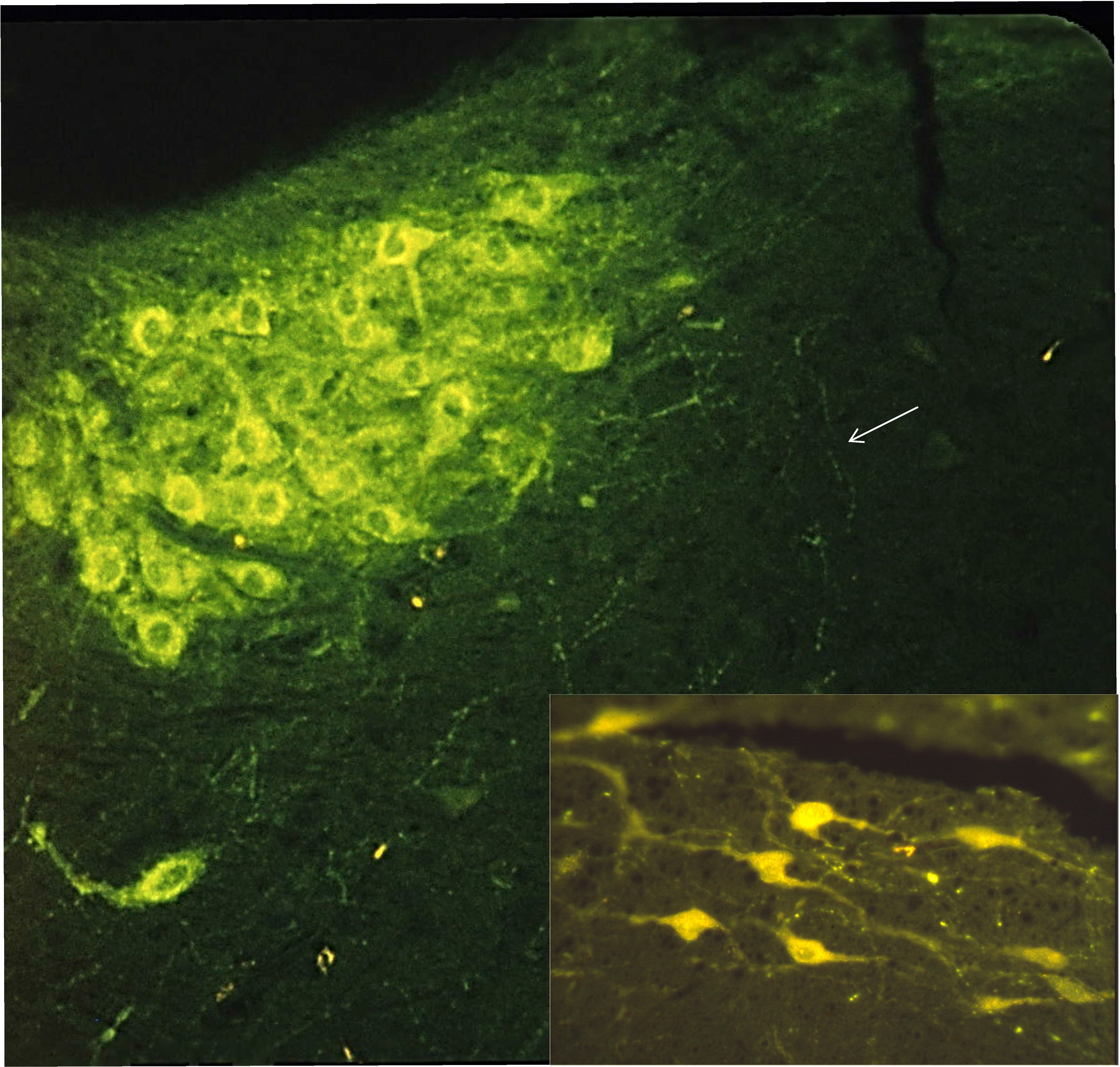
Brain stem nerve cell bodies with noradrenaline and (inset) serotonin

The next step led to the central nervous system. It was taken by Marthe Vogt, a refugee from Germany who at that time worked with John Henry Gaddum in the Institute of Pharmacology of the University of Edinburgh. "The presence of noradrenaline and adrenaline in the brain has been demonstrated by von Euler (1946) and Holtz (1950). These substances were supposed, undoubtedly correctly, to occur in the cerebral vasomotor nerves. The present work is concerned with the question whether these sympathomimetic amines, besides their role as transmitters at vasomotor endings, play a part in the function of the central nervous tissue itself. In this paper, these amines will be referred to as sympathin, since they were found invariably to occur together, with noradrenaline representing the major component, as is characteristic for the transmitter of the peripheral sympathetic system." Vogt created a detailed map of noradrenaline in the dog brain. Its uneven distribution, not reflecting the distribution of vasomotor nerves, and its persistence after removal of the superior cervical ganglia made it "tempting to assign to the cerebral sympathin a transmitter role like that which we assign to the sympathin found in the sympathetic ganglia and their postganglionic fibers." Her assignment was confirmed, the finishing touch being the visualization of the noradrenaline as well as adrenaline and dopamine pathways in the central nervous system by Annica Dahlström and Kjell Fuxe with the formaldehyde fluorescence method developed by Nils-Åke Hillarp (1916–1965) and Bengt Falck (born 1927) in Sweden and by immunochemistry techniques.

== Dopamine ==
As noradrenaline is an intermediate on the path to adrenaline, dopamine is on the path to noradrenaline (and hence adrenaline.) In 1957 dopamine was identified in the human brain by researcher Katharine Montagu. In 1958/59 Arvid Carlsson and his group in the Pharmacology Department of the University of Lund, including the medical students Åke Bertler and Evald Rosengren, not only found dopamine in the brain, but also—like noradrenaline in Marthe Vogt's exemplary study—in uneven distribution, quite different from the distribution of noradrenaline. This argued for a function beyond an intermediate. The concentration was highest in the corpus striatum, which contained only traces of noradrenaline. Carlsson's group had previously found that reserpine, which was known to cause a Parkinsonism syndrome, depleted dopamine (as well as noradrenaline and serotonin) from the brain. They concluded that "dopamine is concerned with the function of the corpus striatum and thus with the control of motor function". Thus for the first time the reserpine-induced Parkinsonism in laboratory animals and, by implication, Parkinson's disease in humans was related to depletion of striatal dopamine. A year later Oleh Hornykiewicz, who had been introduced to dopamine by Blaschko and was carrying out a color reaction on extracts of human corpus striatum in the Pharmacological Institute of the University of Vienna, saw the brain dopamine deficiency in Parkinson's disease "with his own naked eye: Instead of the pink color given by the comparatively high concentrations of dopamine in the control samples, the reaction vials containing the extracts of the Parkinson's disease striatum showed hardly a tinge of pink discoloration".

In 1970, von Euler and Axelrod were two of three winners of the Nobel Prize in Physiology or Medicine, "for their discoveries concerning the humoral transmitters in the nerve terminals and the mechanism for their storage, release and inactivation", and in 2000 Carlsson was one of three winners who got the prize "for their discoveries concerning signal transduction in the nervous system".

== Membrane passage ==
Membranes play a twofold role for catecholamines: catecholamines must pass through membranes and deliver their chemical message at membrane receptors.

Catecholamines are synthesized inside cells and sequestered in intracellular vesicles. This was first shown by Blaschko and Arnold Welch (1908–2003) in Oxford and by Hillarp and his group in Lund for the adrenal medulla and later for sympathetic nerves and the brain. In addition the vesicles contained adenosine triphosphate (ATP), with a molar noradrenaline:ATP ratio in sympathetic nerve vesicles of 5.2:1 as determined by Hans-Joachim Schümann (1919–1998) and Horst Grobecker (born 1934) in Peter Holtz′ group at the Goethe University Frankfurt. Blaschko and Welch wondered how the catecholamines got out when nervous impulses reached the cells. Exocytosis was not among the possibilities they considered. It required the analogy of the "quantal" release of acetylcholine at the neuromuscular junction shown by Bernard Katz, third winner of the 1970 Nobel Prize in Physiology or Medicin'; the demonstration of the co-release with catecholamines of other vesicle constituents such as ATP and dopamine β-hydroxylase; and the unquestionable electron microscopic images of vesicles fusing with the cell membrane—to establish exocytosis.

Acetylcholine, once released, is degraded in the extracellular space by acetylcholinesterase, which faces that space. In the case the catecholamines, however, the enzymes of degradation monoamine oxidase and catechol-O-methyl transferase, like the enzymes of synthesis, are intracellular. Not metabolism but uptake through cell membranes therefore is the primary means of their clearance from the extracellular space. The mechanisms were deciphered beginning in 1959. Axelrod's group in Bethesda wished to clarify the in vivo fate of catecholamines using radioactively labelled catecholamines of high specific activity, which had just become available. ^{3}H-adrenaline and ^{3}H-noradrenaline given intravenously to cats were partly O-methylated, but another part was taken up in the tissues and stored unchanged. Erich Muscholl (born 1926) in Mainz, who had worked with Marthe Vogt in Edinburgh, wished to know how cocaine sensitized tissues to catecholamines—a fundamental mechanism of action of cocaine discovered by Otto Loewi and Alfred Fröhlich in 1910 in Vienna. Intravenous noradrenaline was taken up into the heart and spleen of rats, and cocaine prevented the uptake, "thus increasing the amount of noradrenaline available for combination with the adrenergic receptors". The uptake of ^{3}H-noradrenaline was severely impaired after sympathectomy, indicating that it occurred mainly into sympathetic nerve terminals. In support of this, Axelrod and Georg Hertting (born 1925) showed that freshly incorporated ^{3}H-noradrenaline was re-released from the cat spleen when the sympathetic nerves were stimulated. A few years later, Leslie Iversen (born 1937) in Cambridge found that other cells also took up catecholamines. He called uptake into noradrenergic neurons, which were cocaine-sensitive, uptake_{1} and uptake into other cells, which were cocaine-resistant, uptake_{2}. With the reserpine-sensitive uptake from the cytoplasm into the storage vesicles there were thus three catecholamine membrane passage mechanisms. Iversen's book of 1967 "The Uptake and Storage of Noradrenaline in Sympathetic Nerves" was successful, showing the fascination of the field and its rich pharmacology.

With the advent of molecular genetics, the three transport mechanisms have been traced to the proteins and their genes since 1990. They now consist of the plasma membrane noradrenaline transporter (NAT or NET), the classical uptake_{1}, and the analogous dopamine transporter (DAT); the plasma membrane extraneuronal monoamine transporter or organic cation transporter 3 (EMT or SLC22A3), Iversen's uptake_{2}; and the vesicular monoamine transporter (VMAT) with two isoforms. Transporters and intracellular enzymes such as monoamine oxidase operating in series constitute what the pharmacologist Ullrich Trendelenburg at the University of Würzburg called metabolizing systems.

== Receptors ==
Research on the catecholamines was interwoven with research on their receptors. In 1904, Dale became head of the Wellcome Physiological Research Laboratory in London and started research on ergot extracts. The relevance of his communication in 1906 "On some physiological actions of ergot" lies less in the effects of the extracts given alone than in their interaction with adrenaline: they reversed the normal pressor effect of adrenaline to a depressor effect and the normal contraction effect on the early-pregnant cat's uterus to relaxation: adrenaline reversal. The pressor and uterine contraction effects of pituitary extracts, in contrast, remained unchanged, as did the effects of adrenaline on the heart and effects of parasympathetic nerve stimulation. Dale clearly saw the specificity of the "paralytic" (antagonist) effect of ergot for "the so-called myoneural junctions connected with the true sympathetic or thoracic-lumbar division of the autonomic nervous system"—the adrenoceptors. He also saw its specificity for the "myoneural junctions" mediating smooth muscle contraction as opposed to those mediating smooth muscle relaxation. But there he stopped. He did not conceive any close relationship between the smooth muscle-inhibitory and the cardiac sites of action of catecholamines.

Catecholamine receptors persisted in this wavering state for more than forty years. Additional blocking agents were found such as tolazoline in Switzerland and phenoxybenzamine in the United States, but like the ergot alkaloids they blocked only the smooth muscle excitatory receptors. Additional agonists also were synthesized. Outstanding among them became isoprenaline, N-isopropyl-noradrenaline, of Boehringer Ingelheim, studied pharmacologically along with adrenaline and other N-substituted noradrenaline derivatives by Richard Rössler (1897–1945) and Heribert Konzett (1912–2004) in Vienna. The Viennese pharmacologists used their own Konzett-Rössler test to examine bronchodilation. Intravenous injection of pilocarpine to induce bronchospasm was followed by intravenous injection of the agonists. "Arrangement of all amines according to their bronchodilator effect yields a series from the most potent, isopropyl-adrenaline, via the approximately equipotent bodies adrenaline, propyl-adrenaline and butyl-adrenaline, to the weakly active isobutyl-adrenaline." Isoprenaline also exerted marked positive chronotropic and inotropic effects. Boehringer introduced it for use in asthma in 1940. After the war it became available to Germany's former enemies and over the years was traded under about 50 names. In addition to this therapeutic success it was one of the agonists with which Raymond P. Ahlquist solved the "myoneural junction" riddle. "By virtue of this property the reputation of the substance spread all over the world and it became a tool for many investigations on different aspects of pharmacology and therapeutics." The story had a dark side: overdosage caused numerous deaths due to cardiac side effects, an estimated three thousands in the United Kingdom alone.

Ahlquist was head of the Department of Pharmacology of the University of Georgia School of Medicine, now Georgia Regents University. In 1948 he saw what had escaped Dale in 1906. "The adrenotropic receptors have been considered to be of two classes, those whose action results in excitation and those whose action results in inhibition of the effector cells. Experiments described in this paper indicate that although there are two kinds of adrenotropic receptors they cannot be classified simply as excitatory or inhibitory since each kind of receptor may have either action depending on where it is found." Ahlquist chose six agonists, including adrenaline, noradrenaline, α-methylnoradrenaline and isoprenaline, and examined their effects on several organs. He found that the six substances possessed two—and only two—rank orders of potency in these organs. For example, the rank order of potency was "adrenaline > noradrenaline > α-methylnoradrenaline > isoprenaline" in promoting contraction of blood vessels, but "isoprenaline > adrenaline > α-methylnoradrenaline > noradrenaline" in stimulating the heart. The receptor with the first rank order (for example for blood vessel contraction) he called alpha adrenotropic receptor (now α-adrenoceptor or α-adrenergic receptor), while the receptor with the second rank order (for instance for stimulation of the heart, but also for bronchodilation) he called beta adrenotropic receptor (now β-adrenoceptor or β-adrenergic receptor). "This concept of two fundamental types of receptors is directly opposed to the concept of two mediator substances (sympathin E and sympathin I) as propounded by Cannon and Rosenblueth and now widely quoted as 'law' of physiology. ... There is only one adrenergic neuro-hormone, or sympathin, and that sympathin is identical with epinephrine."

The haze surrounding the receptors was thus blown away. Yet, perhaps because Ahlquist dismissed Cannon and Rosenblueth rather harshly, his manuscript was rejected by the Journal of Pharmacology and Experimental Therapeutics and only in a second submission accepted by the American Journal of Physiology.

In retrospect, although Ahlquist was right in his "one transmitter—two receptors" postulate, he erred in the identification of the transmitter with adrenaline. There is an additional qualification. For many responses to sympathetic nerve stimulation, the ATP co-stored with noradrenaline is a cotransmitter. It acts through purinoceptors. Lastly, Ahlquist failed to adduce the selectivity of all antagonists known at his time for the α-adrenoceptor as an additional argument.

The α,β-terminology initially was slow to spread. This changed with two publications in 1958. In the first, from Lilly Research Laboratories, dichloroisoprenaline selectively blocked some smooth muscle inhibitory effects of adrenaline and isoprenaline; in the second, it blocked cardiac excitatory effects of adrenaline and isoprenaline as well. In the first, which does not mention Ahlquist, dichloroisoprenaline blocked "certain adrenergic inhibitory receptor sites"; but in the second the results "support the postulate of Ahlquist (1948) that the adrenotropic inhibitory receptors and the cardiac chronotropic and inotropic adrenergic receptors are functionally identical, i.e., that both are beta type receptors. … It is suggested that this terminology be extended to the realm of adrenergic blocking drugs, e.g., that blocking drugs be designated according to the receptor for which they have the greatest affinity, as either alpha or beta adrenergic blocking drugs."

Dichloroisoprenaline was the first beta blocker; it retains some intrinsic activity. Pronethalol followed in 1962 and propranolol in 1964, both invented by James Black and his colleagues at Imperial Chemical Industries Pharmaceuticals in England. In 1967, β-adrenoceptors were subdivided into β_{1} and β_{2}, and a third β type began to be suspected in the late 1970s, above all in adipocytes.

After premonitions for example in the work of the Portuguese pharmacologist Serafim Guimarães, α-adrenoceptor subclassification came in 1971 with the discovery of the self-regulation of noradrenaline release through α-adrenoceptors on noradrenergic synaptic terminals, presynaptic α-autoreceptors. Their existence was initially combated but is now established, for example by the demonstration of their messenger RNA in noradrenergic neurons. They differed from α-receptors on effector cells and in 1974 became the prototype α_{2}-receptors, the long-known smooth muscle contraction-mediating receptors becoming α_{1}.

Even before dopamine was identified as the third catecholamine transmitter, Blaschko suspected it might possess receptors of its own, since Peter Holtz and his group in 1942 had found that small doses of dopamine lowered the blood pressure of rabbits and guinea pigs, whereas adrenaline always increased the blood pressure. Holtz erred in his interpretation, but Blaschko had "no doubt that his observations are of the greatest historical importance, as the first indication of an action of dopamine that characteristically and specifically differs from those of the two other catecholamines". A re-investigation of the blood pressure-lowering effect in dogs in 1964 proposed "specific dopamine receptors for dilation", and at the same time evidence for dopamine receptors distinct from α- and β-adrenoceptors accrued from other experimental approaches.

In 1986, the first gene coding for a catecholamine receptor, the β_{2}-adrenoceptor from hamster lung, was cloned by a group of sixteen scientists, among them Robert Lefkowitz and Brian Kobilka of Duke University in Durham, North Carolina. Genes for all mammalian catecholamine receptors have now been cloned, for the nine adrenoceptors α_{1A}, α_{1B}, α_{1D}, α_{2A}, α_{2B}, α_{2C}, β_{1}, β_{2} and β_{3} and the five dopamine receptors D_{1}, D_{2}, D_{3}, D_{4} and D_{5}. Their fine structure, without agonist or agonist-activated, is being studied at high resolution.

Earl Wilbur Sutherland won the 1971 Nobel Prize in Physiology or Medicine "for his discoveries concerning the mechanisms of the action of hormones", in particular the discovery of cyclic adenosine monophosphate as second messenger in the action of catecholamines at β-adrenoceptors and of glucagon at glucagon receptors, which led on to the discovery of heterotrimeric G proteins. In 1988 James Black was one of three winners of the Nobel Prize in Physiology or Medicine "for their discoveries of important principles for drug treatment", Black's "important principles" being the blockade of β-adrenoceptors and of histamine H_{2} receptors. In 2012, Robert Lefkowitz and Brian Kobilka shared the Nobel Prize in Chemistry "for studies of G-protein-coupled receptors".

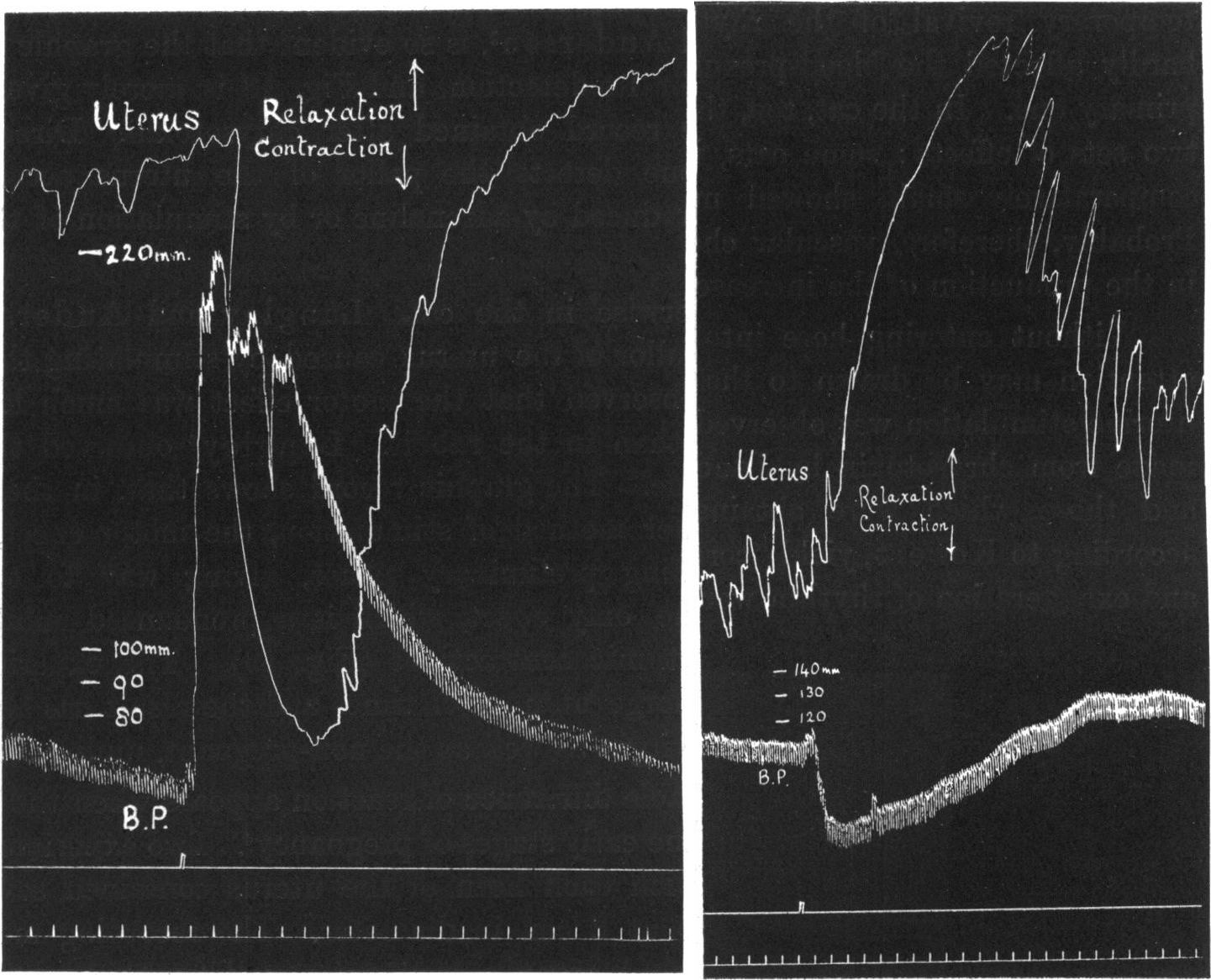
Adrenaline reversal after Henry Hallett Dale (1906). An ergot extract was injected between left-hand and right-hand tracings.

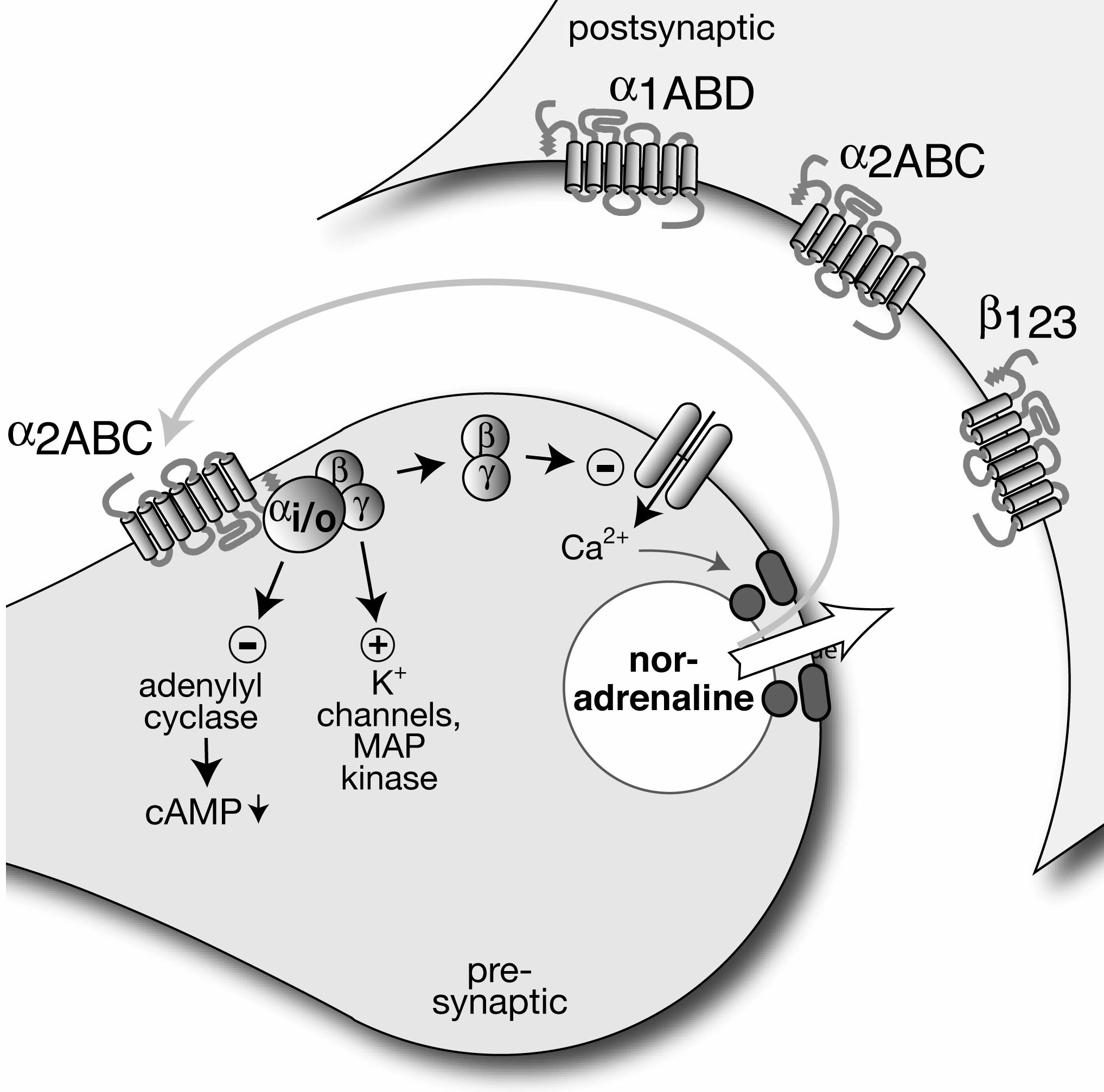
Presynaptic α_{2}-autoreceptor and postsynaptic adrenoceptors of a noradrenergic axon terminal.

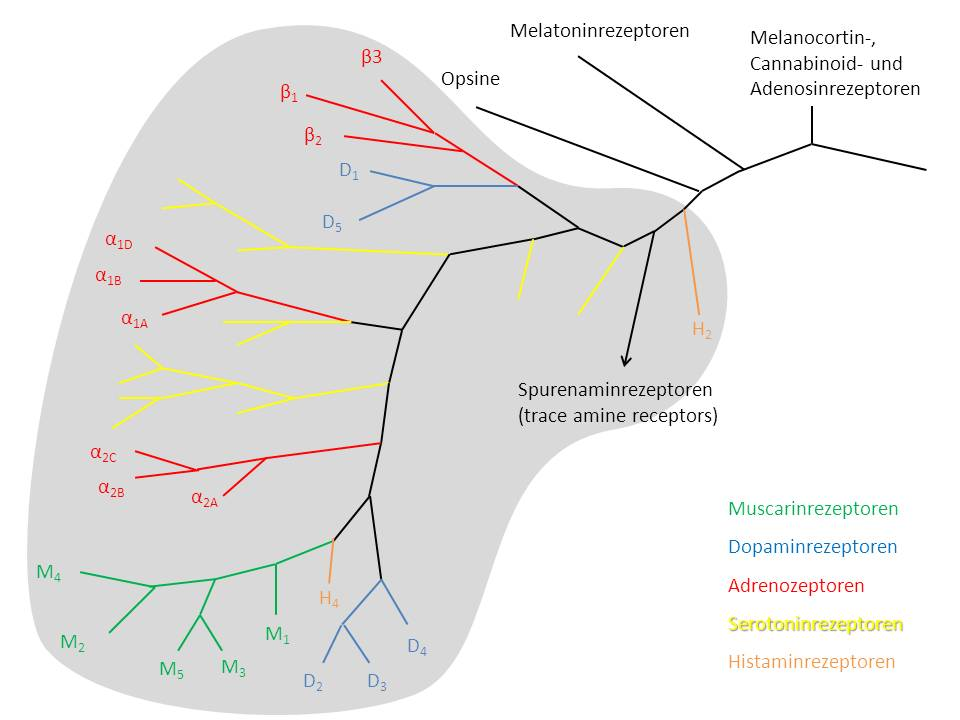
Amine receptor branch of the family tree of G protein-coupled receptors.

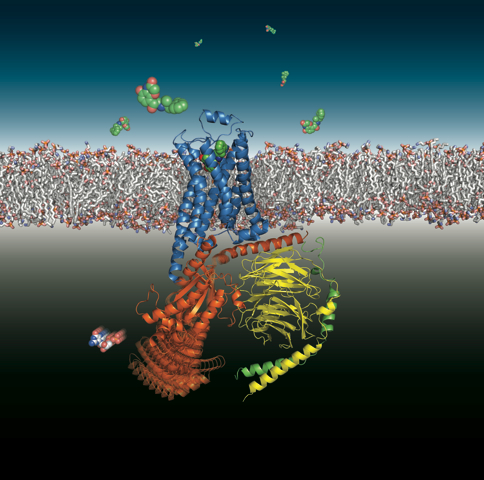
The β_{2}-adrenoceptor (blue) coupling to the heterotrimeric G protein G_{S} (red, yellow, green) after binding of an agonist.
