= Guimarães (disambiguation) =

Guimarães is a city and municipality in Portugal.

Guimarães may also refer to:

- Guimarães (surname)
- Guimarães, Maranhão, municipality in Brazil
- Guimarães Rugby UFC, rugby team
- Vitória de Guimarães, Portuguese professional football club

== See also ==
- Guima (disambiguation)
- Guimaras (disambiguation)
