= António Cabreira =

Portuguese mathematician, polygraph and publicist (1868–1953)

António Cabreira ComSE
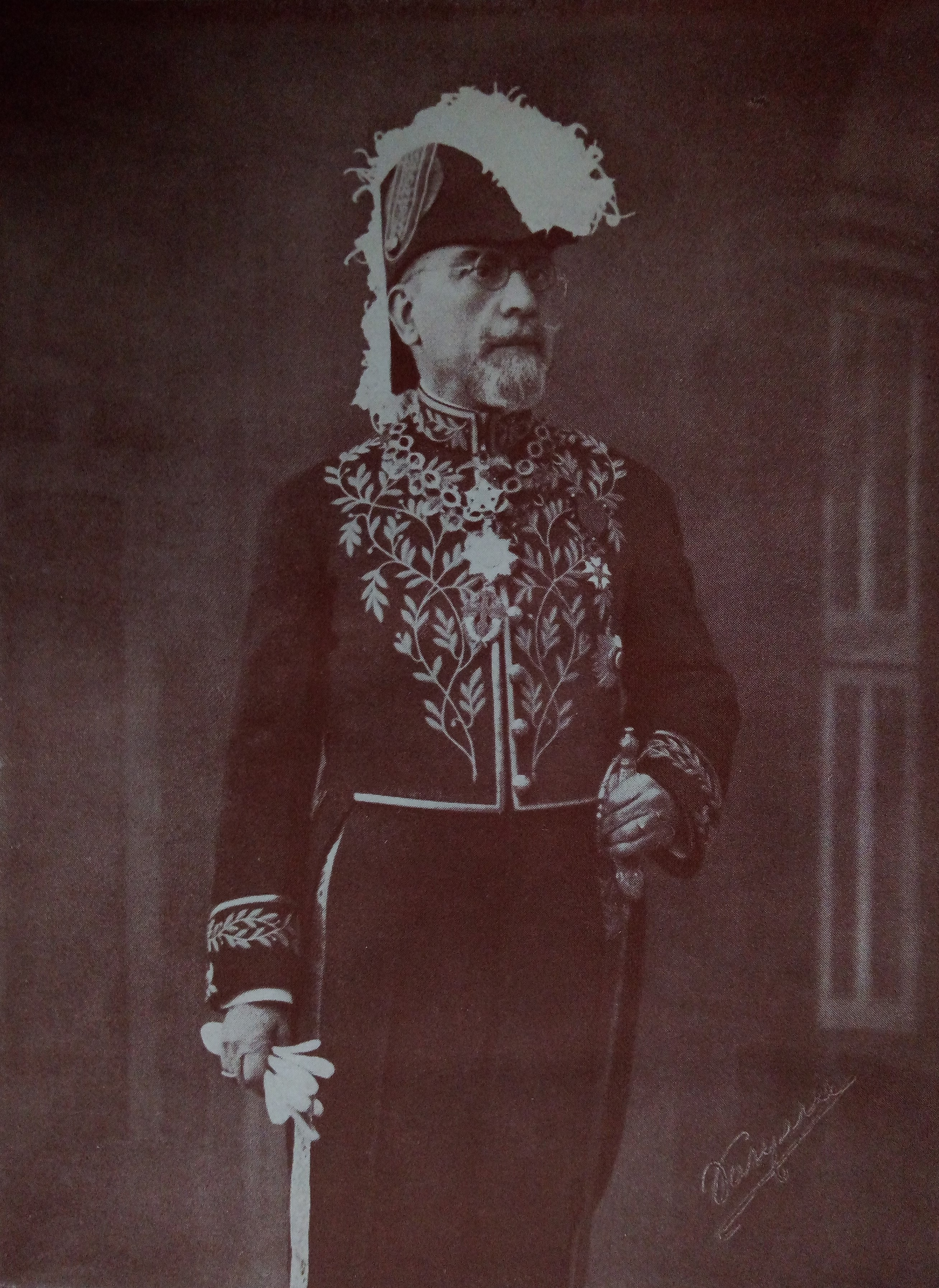
- Born: António Tomás da Guarda Cabreira de Faria e Alvelos Drago da Ponte; 30 October 1868; Santa Maria, Tavira, Portugal
- Died: 21 November 1953 (aged 85); São José, Lisbon, Portugal
- Occupation: Polygraph

D. António Tomás da Guarda Cabreira de Faria e Alvelos Drago da Ponte (Note: Alternatively rendered as Antonio Thomaz da Guarda Cabreira de Faria e Alvellos Drago da Ponte, the standard spelling before the 1911 spelling reform.) ComSE (30 October 1868 – 21 November 1953) was a Portuguese mathematician, polygraph and publicist. A member of the aristocratic Cabreira family, António Cabreira was a claimant to the Miguelist noble titles of Count of Lagos and Viscount of Vale da Mata, which he used.

António Cabreira is notable for his vast published work on an extensive variety of different fields (among them mathematics and geometry — one of his papers posited a solution for the problem of squaring the circle, as well as that of circling the square, cubing the sphere, and sphering the cube — mechanics, astronomy, literature, art, anthropology, philosophy, sociology, history, archaeology, insurance, jurisprudence, politics, and military organisation), and for spearheading the creation of many ephemeral learned societies, chief among them the Academy of Sciences of Portugal (created in 1907 after dissension with the Lisbon Academy of Sciences) and the António Cabreira Institute (established in 1919).

== Early life and education ==
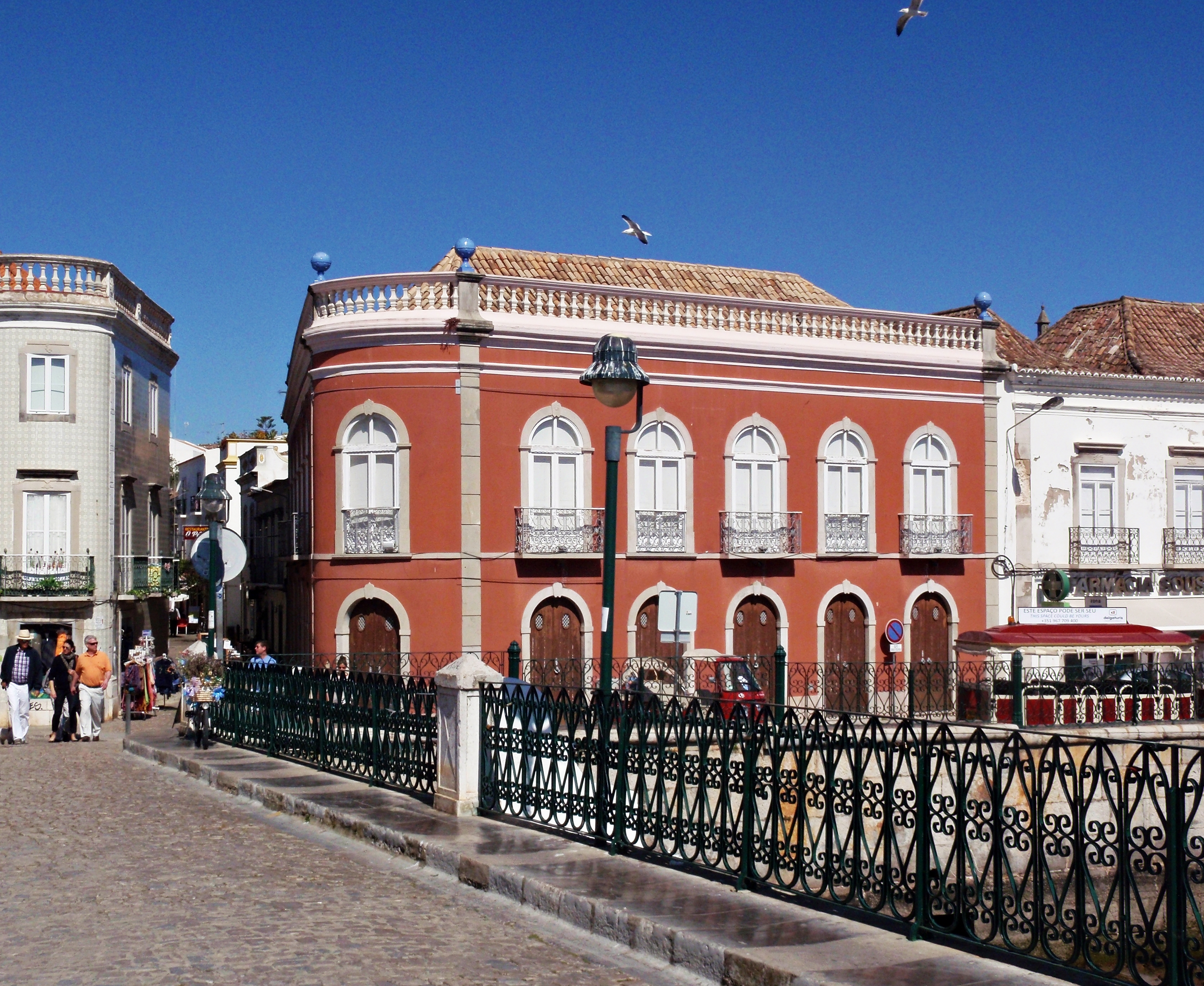
Birthplace of António Cabreira, in Tavira (currently the Municipal Archive)

António Cabreira was born at 4:30 p.m. on 30 October 1868, in the family home in Tavira, on the corner of Rua Borda de Água de Aguiar and Rua da Alegria (renamed in 1917, Rua Jacques Pessoa and Rua Dr. António Cabreira, respectively). He was the son of General Tomás António da Guarda Cabreira (1822–1886) and his wife D. Francisca Emília Pereira da Silva from Ponta Delgada; on his father's side, he was the grandson of Tomás António da Guarda Cabreira (1792–1834), a field marshal in the Miguelist army during the Portuguese Civil War, who had been granted the titles of Count of Lagos and Viscount of Vale da Mata by the Miguelist faction. António Cabreira was the younger brother of Colonel Tomás Cabreira (1865–1918), a Republican politician who taught chemistry at the Lisbon Polytechnic School and who briefly occupied the office of Minister of Finance in 1914.

António Cabreira was baptized at the Church of Saint Mary of the Castle, on 17 February 1869. As a child, Cabreira was taught by Fr. Francisco de Paula da Fonseca Neves, parish priest of Lumiar in Lisbon, but abandoned his studies at age 12 to accompany his father while he served as a lieutenant colonel in Porto and in Lagos. In 1885, at age 17, he enrolled in the National Lyceum of Faro, and from 1887 to 1889, went to study in Lisbon. At age 21, after a medical committee turned him down as physically unfit for a military career like that of his father and grandfather, he started attending the marine engineering course at the Lisbon Polytechnic School: it was around this time that he became engaged in politics (a fact that once again forced him to interrupt his studies), having joined the Legitimist Party. He quickly rose though the ranks and filled several positions in the party leadership, having successfully brought student grievances to public attention and lobbied for student welfare. In 1891, Cabreira became the Political Editor of the periodical A Nação, the official organ of the Legitimist Party.

== Academia ==
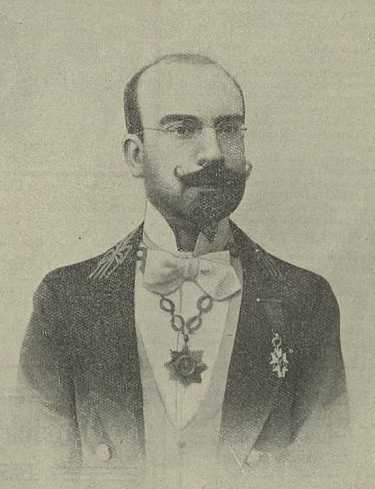
Photograph of António Cabreira, published in 1914

In 1894, António Cabreira established the Instituto Dezanove de Setembro (Nineteenth of September Institute; the birthday of Miguel, Duke of Braganza), which provided primary and secondary education courses. Cabreira was at first occupied with the management of the institution; in 1899, he began teaching Rational Mechanics and Philosophy of Mathematics to the Institute's Science students.

In the wake of the generalised nationalist sentiment brought about after the 1890 British Ultimatum, António Cabreira became active in the Lisbon Geographic Society, vigorously promoting Portuguese colonialism.

In the 1890s, António Cabreira started publishing his numerous monographs that brought to light his mathematical discoveries and his novel viewpoints on philosophy and sociology: among these first works are Análise Geométrica de Duas Espirais Parabólicas ("Geometric Analysis of Two Parabolic Spirals", 1895), Sobre as Propriedades Geométricas da Espiral de Poinsot ("On the Geometric Properties of Poinsot's Spiral", 1896), Descoberta e Primeiras Propriedades Geométricas de uma Espiral Binómia do Primeiro Grau ("Discovery and First Geometric Properties of a Binomial Spiral of the First Degree", 1897). In 1896, the Geographic Society publicly lauded his first works as "scientific successes". On 18 March 1897, he was simultaneous and unanimously elected a fellow of the Royal Academy of Sciences and a foreign associate of the Academy of Sciences, Inscriptions, and Fine Arts of Toulouse. He later became a corresponding member of the Academy of Sciences and Letters of Montpellier (29 March 1898), of the Academy of Sciences, Arts, and Fine Arts of Dijon (3 March 1897), of the Academy of Political and Social Sciences of Venezuela (7 March 1922), a corresponding academic of the Royal Academy of Sciences and Arts of Barcelona (31 March 1909), and a corresponding academic of the International Academy of Letters and Sciences of Naples (6 April 1921).

He was awarded an honorary doctorate in Mathematics by the University of Arizona on 18 June 1912, and was bestowed with the University of Amsterdam's Medal of Honour on 23 December 1933, on the occasion of its tricentennial.

In 1907, António Cabreira founded the Academy of Sciences of Portugal, as a competing institution to the old Lisbon Royal Academy of Sciences. The new, short-lived Academy (dissolved in 1925), was a reflection of Cabreira's partisanship of absolutism and his loathing for the declining liberal monarchy and its institutions; the new Academy attracted valuable support from leading figures of the republican movement — unlikely allies but also oppositionists to the regime — chief among them prominent politicians (and later Presidents of the Republic) Teófilo Braga, Bernardino Machado, and António José de Almeida. After the 1910 Revolution, the Republican authorities were quick to approve the statutes of the new Academy in an attempt to legitimise it into an official academy of the regime, but in due course, and especially after Braga's death in 1924, it started to lose its relative importance and fading into obscurity as the old Lisbon Academy was gradually assimilated into the new regime.

Nevertheless, the Academy was successively enlarged by the creation of "Annexed Institutes", with the intention of disseminating the Academy's "patriotic and educational work" throughout the Portuguese World. These included:

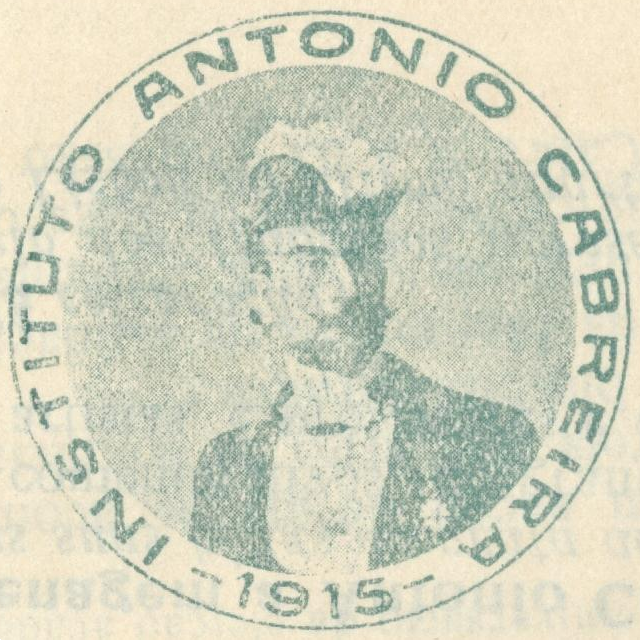
Logo of the Instituto António Cabreira

- The Instituto Teofiliano ("Theophilian Institute"), established in 1912, named after its patron, Teófilo Braga, and devoted to the study of his literary and political work;
- The Instituto de Trabalhos Sociais ("Institute for Social Works"), established in 1914, that worked with a trade association representing national matchmakers so their products could compete with foreign ones in the Portuguese colonies;
- The Instituto Arqueológico do Algarve ("Algarve Archeological Institute"), established in 1915;
- The Instituto Histórico do Minho ("Minho Historical Institute"), established in 1916 and headquartered in the 15th-century Casa dos Arcos in Viana do Castelo, under the patronage of explorer Gonçalo Velho;
- The Instituto António Cabreira ("António Cabreira Institute"), established in 1919, named after Cabreira himself, with the goal of studying and divulging "his valuable work and his relevant services to Science and Homeland";
- The Instituto Científico-Literário de Trás-os-Montes ("Trás-os-Montes Scientific and Literary Institute");
- The Instituto Histórico-Arqueológico do Alentejo ("Alentejo Historical and Archeological Institute"), headquartered in Évora and with branches in other district capitals in Alentejo;
- The Instituto Etnológico da Beira-Alta/Viseu ("Beira Alta/Viseu Ethnological Institute").

António Cabreira was also responsible for the First Colonial Congress in 1900, and the First National Pedagogical Congress in 1908. In 1920, Cabreira hosted the First National Archaeological Congress (Congresso Arqueológico Nacional), held in Tavira. Even though it was sparsely attended by the Portuguese archaeologists, the Congress was notable for defending the principle of archaeological exploration across the country and the safeguarding and promotion of archaeological heritage, and for criticising the established practices of the National Archaeology Museum.

== Criticism ==
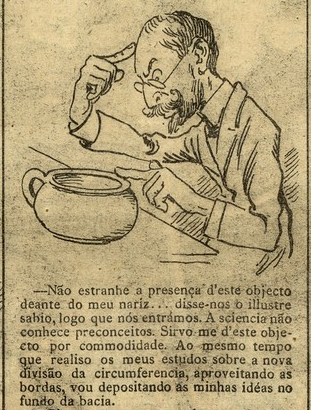
Caricature of António Cabreira studying a chamber pot, published in Bordalo Pinheiro's satirical periodical A Paródia in 1902. The text reads: "Do not be surprised by the presence of this object [...]. I am using it for the sake of convenience: while I can use the rim to test my new method for the division of the circumference, I can also use the inside to unload my ideas."

Antonio Cabreira had an inflated sense of his own academic importance and of the significance of his work. Due to his prolific published monographs on a vast array of different areas of knowledge, he soon created a public image of great intellectual dynamism and exaggerated cultural protagonism. This was heightened by his frequent self-congratulatory publications and speeches, particularly one delivered to the Lisbon Academy of Sciences in 1922 and published under the title Discurso Comemorativo das suas Bodas de Prata Académicas e Epítome dos Trabalhos Apresentados na Academia das Ciências de Lisboa ("Commemorative Speech of His Academic Silver Jubilee and the Epitome of his Work Presented before the Lisbon Academy of Sciences").

His numerous published monographs frequently featured a title page framed by a sprawling full list of his honorary distinctions, mentioning each of his many memberships in national and international learned societies and were accompanied by fanciful photographic portraits of Cabreira in elaborate academic garb, decked in collars and decorations.

This recurring posture inspired harsh criticism from some figures of the Portuguese cultural and academic scene, such as physician and politician Augusto de Vasconcelos, and the priest, theologian and Camões scholar José Maria Rodrigues. Rodolfo Guimarães denounced the quality of Cabreira's work in the field of mathematics and did not go without answer: Cabreira refuted every last of Guimarães's objections in two separate monographs (Quelques mots sur les mathématiques en Portugal, 1905; and Les Mathématiques en Portugal, 1910) — in which he defended his own mathematical work as "original and important". Rather telling is Cabreira's response to the French Academy of Sciences's refusal to publish one of his papers, by arguing that its reception being registered in the Academy's comptes-rendus was in itself proof of its scientific merit:

"Le fait de la Note être mentionnée dans les Comptes Rendus démontre déjà l'existence de quelque valeur, puisque ni tous les travaux adressés à l'Académie sont présentés en scéance. En outre, mon travail ne pouvait être publié par cette très haute corporation scientifique en conséquence d'avoir un caractère très élémentaire."

== Death and legacy ==
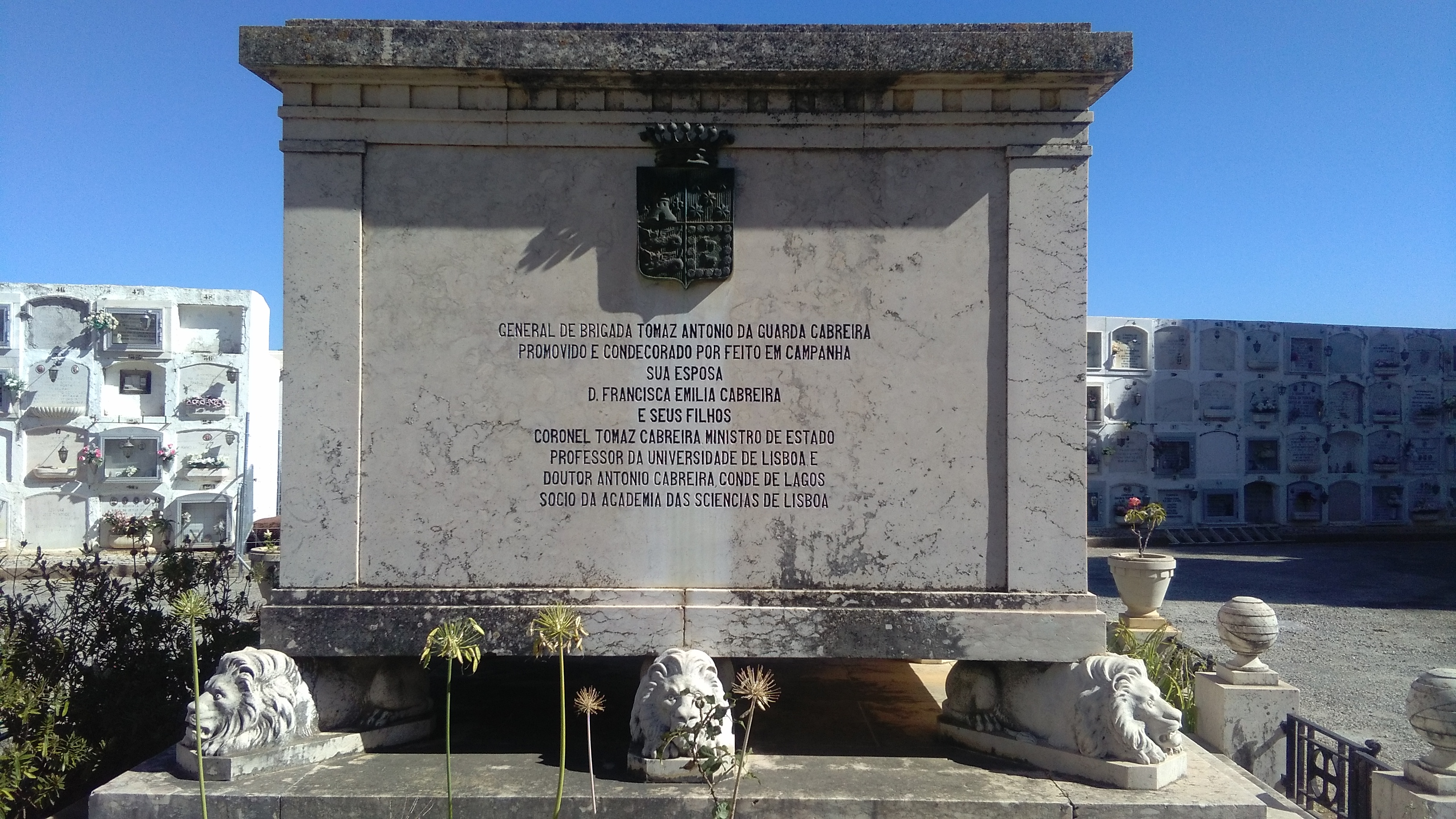
The Cabreira family plot in the Tavira Municipal Cemetery; the inscription pertaining to António Cabreira reads: "DOCTOR ANTONIO CABREIRA, COUNT OF LAGOS / FELLOW OF THE LISBON ACADEMY OF SCIENCES".

António Cabreira died in Lisbon, on 21 November 1953, and was interred in the family plot, in the Municipal Cemetery in Tavira, beside the remains of his parents, General Tomás António da Guarda Cabreira and D. Francisca Emília Cabreira, as well as those of his brother, Colonel Tomás Cabreira. The imposing funerary monument is decorated with the arms attributed to the Counts of Lagos, and architectural motifs of lions, armillary spheres, and the crosses of the Military Order of Aviz and of the Military Order of Saint James of the Sword. The back of the monument is inscribed:

EIS UM MOIMENTO DIGNO E QUE A SAUDADE ERGUEU
PARA REPÔR NA MORTE O MEU DESFEITO LAR
JULHO 5 DE 1928
("Behold a dignified monument that longing built / to set right, in death, my broken home / 5 July 1928")

The mausoleum was unveiled with much pomp on 5 July 1928, in the presence of the Civil Governor of Faro District (standing in for the President of the Republic), as well as representatives of the Ministers of War and of Public Instruction, the local Mayor, the Military Commander, the Municipal Administrator, and the parish priest.

A bust of António Cabreira by sculptor Raul Xavier was unveiled in 1944 in the Public Park in Tavira, in the presence of Cabreira himself, on the occasion of his Academic Golden Jubilee. In 1942, Cabreira donated the house in which he was born (located on a street that currently bears his name) to the local City Council, as a suitable place to hold the Municipal Archive; it serves that purpose to this day. His personal archive, as well as the furniture in his personal study, was left to the Lisbon Geographic Society.

== Distinctions ==
=== National orders ===
- Commander of the Military Order of Saint James of the Sword (17 May 1919) (Note: Even though the Official Website of the Portuguese Honorific Orders lists Cabreira as a Commander of the Order of the Tower and Sword, the full list of his distinctions in his published works mention him instead as a Commander of the Order of Saint James of the Sword, and photographs show him wearing the insignias of the latter, not the former.)

=== Foreign orders ===
- Knight of the Legion of Honour, France (8 January 1903)
- First Class of the Order of Merit, Chile (29 June 1922)

=== Confraternal orders ===
António Cabreira was the main founder and promoter of the Order of Saint Mary of the Castle (Ordem de Santa Maria do Castelo), established on 20 December 1921, a confraternal order with the stated goals of exalting the memory of Paio Peres Correia, the knight of the Reconquista who was responsible for the military campaign that saw the fortified city of Tavira reconquered from the Almohad Caliphate in 1242, and preserving the Church of Saint Mary of the Castle, the town's mother church. As a descendant of Paio Peres Correia, António Cabreira had the rank of "Knight of Honour". The Order's statutes were approved by the Government, the Cardinal-Patriarch of Lisbon (António Mendes Belo), and the Bishop of Faro; however, by 1947, the Order was seemingly dormant and the State had forbidden its use in official ceremonies.
