= Tomas Hökfelt =

Swedish professor in histology

Tomas Gustav Magnus Hökfelt (born 29 June 1940) is a Swedish physician and former professor in histology at the Karolinska Institutet from 1979 until 2006, when he got his emeritate. He was linked to the Department of Neuroscience and is specialized in cell biology.

== Biography ==
Tomas Hökfelt was born in Stockholm, Sweden in 1940. He enrolled in the Karolinska Institutet in 1960 and got his BA in medicine in 1960. He then studied at the Karolinska Institutet under professor Nils-Åke Hillarp, studying monoamine neurons, getting his PhD in 1968 and his MD in 1971. He became an assistant professor in 1968, and from 1979 until 2006, Hökfelt worked as a professor at the Karolinska Institute. He was also a faculty member of the Department of Biotechnology at the Royal Institute of Technology in Stockholm. He served on the Executive Committee of the European College of Neuropsychopharmacology (ECNP) between 2004-2007.

== Research and publications ==
Tomas Hökfelt's early research was on neurotransmitters and neuropeptides in the brain. In 1977 he discovered that non-neurotransmitter peptide molecules like somatostatin, can exist with neurotransmitters in same peripheral and central neurons.

Hökfelt together with Serguei Fetissov has also conducted research into anorexia nervosa, indicating that it may be a disease, caused by a particular group of antibodies.

Together with Anders Björklund, he has edited 21 volumes of the Handbook of Chemical Neuroanatomy between 1983 and 2005

== Awards and honours ==
- 1984 Member of the National Academy of Sciences
- 1987: joint winner of the Artois-Baillet-Latour Health Prize for the study of neuropeptides
- 1988: joint winner of the Bristol-Myers Squibb Award for Distinguished Achievement in Neuroscience Research
- 1992: Doctor Honoris Causa at the University of Tampere, Finland
- 1992: Doctor Honoris Causa at the University of Copenhagen, Denmark
- 1999: Doctor Honoris Causa at the University of Ferrara, Italy
- 1999: Doctor Honoris Causa at the Peking University Health Science Center, China
- 2000: Foreign member of the Chinese Academy of Sciences
- 2000: Doctor Honoris Causa at the Victor Segalen Bordeaux 2 University, France
- 2007: winner of the Grande Médaille of the French Academy of Sciences for his study of neurotransmitters
- Honorary Member of the American Physiological Society
- Hökfelt was one of the fifty most often cited scientists in the period 1983-2003
- 2024: European College of Neuropsychopharmacology (ECNP) Lifetime Achievement Award
- A more complete list of his awards and honours can be found at ISI.
