= Nils-Åke Hillarp =

Swedish scientist (1916–1965)

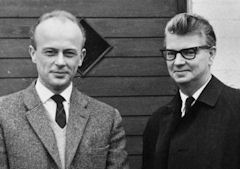
- Hillarp (right) with Bengt Falck, 1963
- Born: 4 July 1916
- Died: 17 March 1965 (aged 48)
- Occupation: scientist

Nils-Åke Hillarp (4 July 1916 – 17 March 1965) was a Swedish scientist and a prominent force in research on the brain's monoamines.

== Biography ==
Hillarp was the son of merchant Nils Bengtsson and Hulda, former Johansson, and the brother of Rut Hillarp, a novelist. He became Doctor of Medical Science (equivalent to a Ph.D.) in 1946. He was appointed assistant and later associate professor of Histology at the University of Lund (1946–1962). The Swedish Medical Research Council enabled him to spend 1960 to 1962 in research at the Department of Pharmacology, University of Gothenburg, then in 1962 he became full professor of histology at the Karolinska Institute in Stockholm, Sweden where he remained until his death in 1965.

== Research ==
Hillarp's research on the terminal fiber system of the autonomic nervous system was of significant importance, as was his work on the mechanics of nerve impulse transmission. Perhaps his most important research was with Bengt Falck, as they together developed the widely known Falck-Hillarp fluorescence method. This method made it possible to transform certain monoamines, specifically serotonin (5-hydroxitryptamine) and the three cathecolamines dopamine, noradrenaline, adrenaline to fluorescent substances that could be detected on the cellular level by fluorescence microscopy. By this method Hillarp and Falck could demonstrate the presence of these monoamines in the central as well as the peripheral nervous system with great precision and susceptibility. This became the first, and also the conclusive, evidence of the function of monoamines as interneuronal signal substances (transmitters). Accordingly, it was not Arvid Carlsson who had discovered that dopamine is a signal substance in the central nervous system, as stated by the Nobel Committee at the Karolinska Institute in a press release in 2000. They had based their opinion on reports published by Carlsson and co-workers in 1957–1958. However, Carlsson, Falck and Hillarp published a study in 1962, which was based on the Falck-Hillarp fluorescence method on the cellular location of noradrenaline and dopamine in the brain, showing that noradrenaline is located in nerve cells (neurons) and functions as a transmitter. However, they could not ultimately define the cell type that harbors dopamine and were thus not able to state with certainty that dopamine is a transmitter. Obviously, if Carlsson had discovered this in 1957–1958, it would have been referred to and extensively discussed in the Carlsson-Falck-Hillarp publication in 1962. Both Hillarp, at the Karolinska Institute in Stockholm and Falck, at the Medical Faculty, University of Lund, had several research assistants, who studied various aspects of transmitters, using the Falck-Hillarp fluorescence method, and it was not long before these two groups had established that dopamine is, indeed, a transmitter. They did not acknowledge the discovery of Katherine Montagu according to Hornywiczs in his L-Dopa paper.

Hillarp and Falck's work was completed in 1961, published in 1962 and was trailblazing in its field. One of the publications was cited in more than 2435 publications and became a part of The 200 Most-Cited Papers of All Time, SCI 1945–1988, see references nr 7. Many accomplished researchers, were tutored by Hillarp, including Annica Dahlström, Nobel prize winner Arvid Carlsson, Kjell Fuxe, Lars Olsson and Tomas Hökfelt. The 50-year anniversary of the introduction of the Falck-Hillarp method was celebrated by a symposium in Lund on April 27, 2012, entitled "From Nerves to Pills".

== Death and legacy ==
Hillarp died from aggressive malign melanoma, 49 years old.

The Hillarp lecture hall at the Karolinska Institute is named after him, and he has been described as "a person who would change neuroscience in Sweden, in fact worldwide, perhaps more than any other Swedish scientist."
