= Guima =

Guima is a nickname, short for Guimarães. It may refer to:

- Guima (footballer, born 1986), Portuguese football striker Bruno Guimarães Pinho de Azevedo
- Guima (footballer, born 1995), Mozambican football midfielder Ricardo Martins Guimarães
