= Serafim Guimarães =

Portuguese physician and pharmacologist

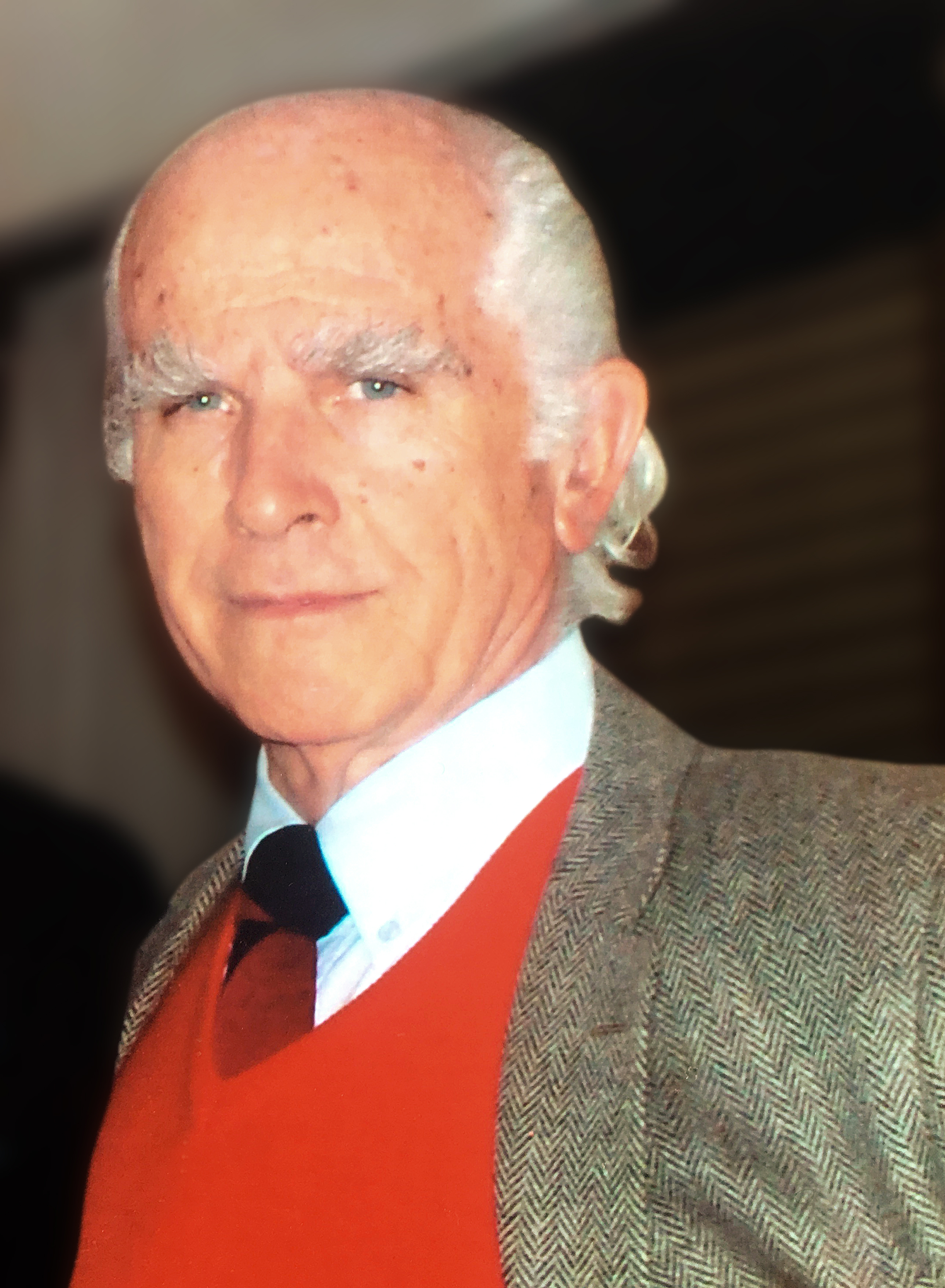
Serafim Guimarães

Serafim Guimarães, full name Serafim Correia Pinto Guimarães, (born May 2, 1934) is a Portuguese physician and pharmacologist. With his colleague Walter Osswald (born 1928) he made the Department of Pharmacology, Medical Faculty of the University of Porto, a center of research on catecholamines and the sympathetic nervous system, especially their relation to blood vessels.

== Life ==
Guimarães was born in Espargo, a village close to the city of Santa Maria da Feira in the Portuguese Região Norte. He is the second son of the peasant Américo Ferreira Pinto Guimarães and his wife Maria Emília Correia née Pais. Serafim studied medicine at the University of Porto and simultaneously worked at the Department of Pharmacology. After military service in Angola from November 1963 to December 1965 he returned to the Department of Pharmacology. In 1966 he spent five months with Hans-Joachim Schümann at the University of Duisburg-Essen, and in 1971 and 1977 another nine months with Ullrich Trendelenburg at the University of Würzburg. He has commemorated Ullrich Trendelenburg, who became his friend, in his book „Retratos legendados“. In 1968, he obtained his Ph.D. based on his thesis Receptores Adrenérgicos – Ensaio de Interpretação e Análise (Adrenoceptors – An Attempt at Interpretation and Analysis). In 1973 he became an assistant professor. He was dismissed in April 1974 in the course of the Carnation Revolution but was reinstated when the pro-Communist Coup of 25 November 1975 was defeated. In 1979, he was nominated Full Professor of Pharmacology and Toxicology. From 1990 to 2005, he was head of the Department. He retired in 2005. His successor is Patrício Soares-da-Silva (born 1957). In 1964 Serafim married Maria de Fátima née Martins de Sousa, with whom he has two sons and a daughter.

== Research ==
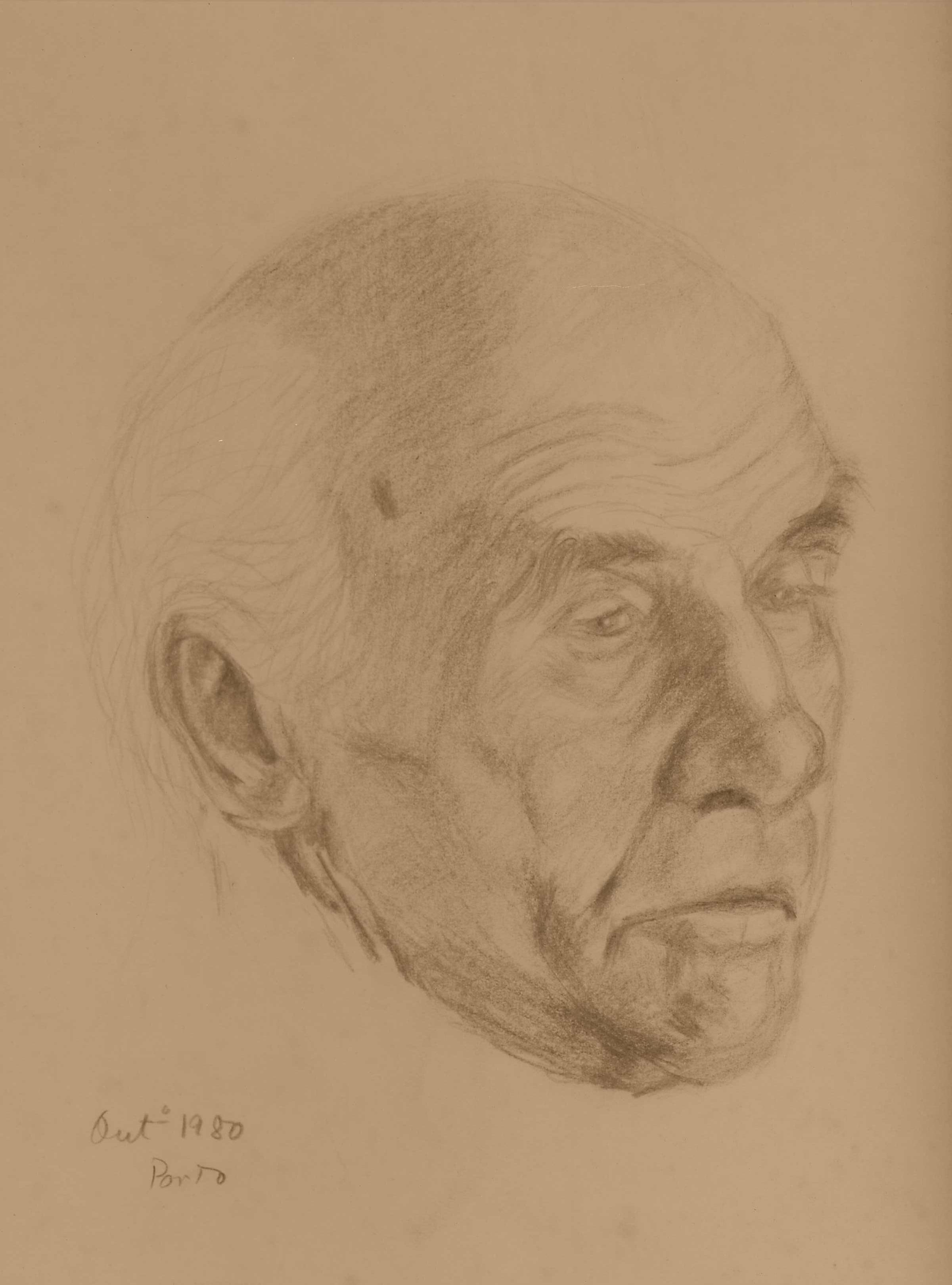
Américo Guimarães, drawn by Serafim Guimarães

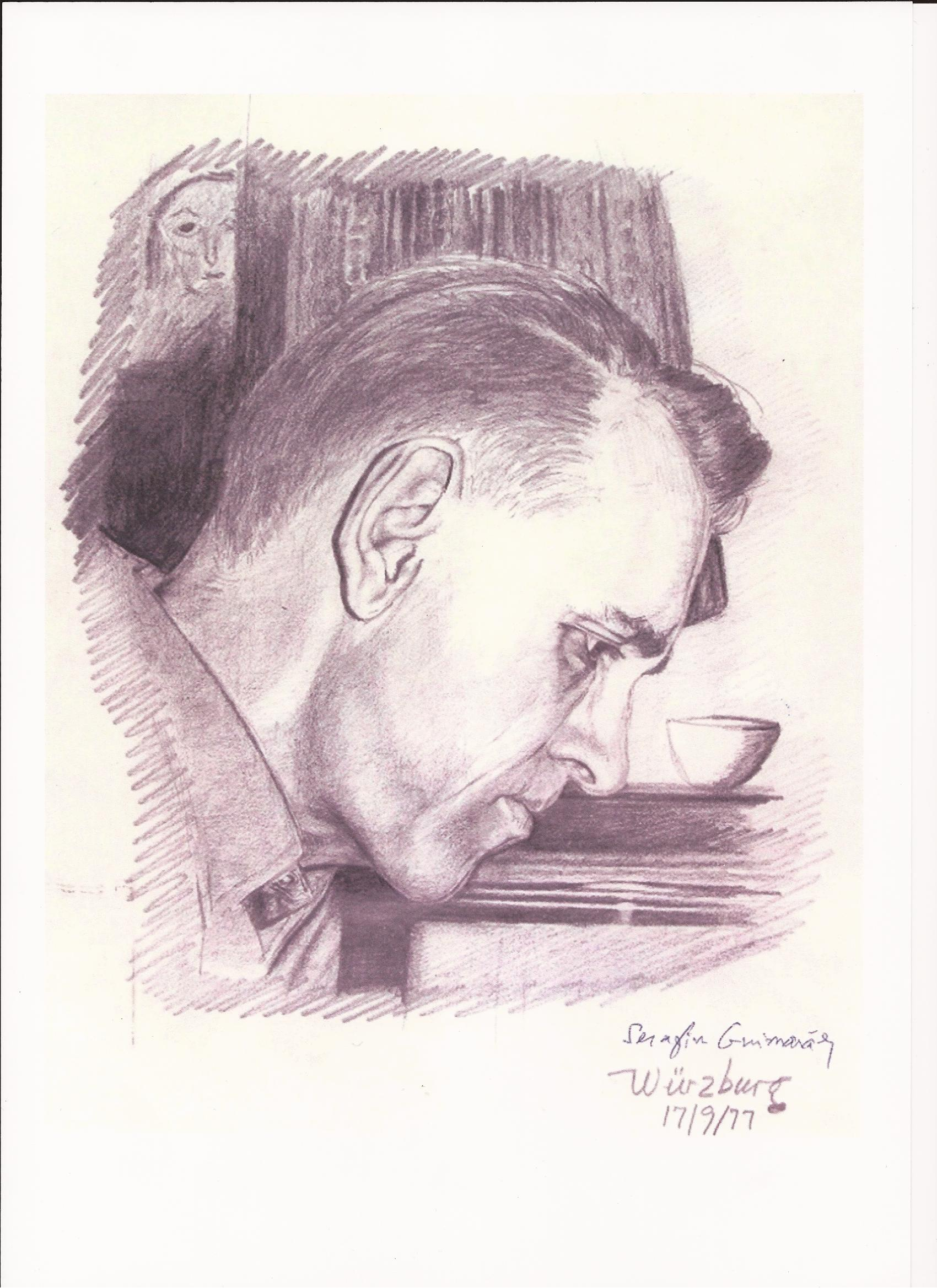
Ullrich Trendelenburg, drawn by Serafim Guimarães

Interest in catecholamines and their receptors dominated the Porto Department in the 1960s. Work just before Guimarães' entry had suggested that there might be more than a single α-adrenoceptor, and so did one of Guimarães' first studies: forerunners of the distinction, important in the history of catecholamine research, between α_{1}- and α_{2}-adrenoceptors.

In the same year 1969 Guimarães, together with Osswald, studied the pharmacology of veins, little known as compared to arteries. All effects of the catecholamines adrenaline, noradrenaline, dopamine and isoprenaline could be accounted for by an action as agonists, activating substances, on α- and β-adrenoceptors co-existing in vascular smooth muscle. Veins and their receptors remained favourites. Guimarães has summarized the knowledge on blood vessels, their nerves and their response to catecholamines in 1983, with Walter Osswald, and in 2001, with his research fellow Daniel Moura. The article of 2001 became his most bibliometrically successful one.

The influence of drugs is determined not only by their pharmacodynamics, especially the existence of receptors, but also by their pharmakokinetics, their fate in living tissue. This aspect was studied in Porto as well. Metabolizing enzymes, namely monoamine oxidase and catechol-O-methyl transferase (COMT), as well as carrier proteins for the transport through cell membranes contributed to the removal of catecholamines from the extracellular space, thus from the neighbourhood of the receptors, and hence to loss of effect. The role played by these processes differed between the various catecholamines and the various tissues.

One pervading difference was that inhibitors of COMT enhanced the effect of isoprenaline at β-adrenoceptors (and the ensuing blood vessel relaxation) but not the effect of noradrenaline at α-adrenoceptors (and the ensuing blood vessel contraction). Conversely inhibitors of the transport of noradrenaline into presynaptic axon terminals – cocaine being a prototype inhibitor – enhanced the effect of noradrenaline at α-, but not the effect of isoprenaline at β-adrenoceptors. Guimarães and his coworkers concluded that the density of COMT was greater in der „biophase“ of the β-adrenoceptors than in the biophase of the α-adrenoceptors. Conversely, the density of the cocaine-sensitive transporters should be greater in the biophase of the α-adrenoceptors than the β-adrenoceptors. The hypothesis was supported by two articles in Naunyn-Schmiedeberg’s Archives of Pharmacology. In 1982, Guimarães wrote in Trends in Pharmacological Sciences: „In vascular tissue there are two different biophases for sympathomimetic agents: one for the α-adrenoceptors around the nerve terminals, where the concentration of the agonist available for the α-effect is mainly governed by uptake into these terminals; one for the β-adrenoceptors in the neighbourhood of COMT whose activity is the main factor determining the concentration of the agonist available for the β-effect.“ Rather than assuming a homogeneous distribution, pharmacologists should reckon with a very inhomogeneous distribution of catecholamines in the extracellular space, low in the immediate neighbourhood of „sites of loss“ such as transporters and enzymes, considerably higher at a distance.

A brief communication of 1981 on presynaptic β-autoreceptors became Guimarães' bibliometrically third-successful paper, and his most successful one reporting original research with new observations. Presynaptic β-autoreceptors, when activated, increase the release of the postganglionic sympathetic neurotransmitter noradrenaline and should therefore mediate a positive feedback, preceding release enhancing further release. This, however, had never been found, perhaps because the receptors are β_{2} and therefore relatively noradrenaline-insensitive. Guimarães and coworkers, once again using veins, enriched sympathetic axon terminals with adrenaline, which is a very strong agonist at β_{2}-adrenoceptors. In this manner they indeed generated a positive feedback: the beta blocker propranolol reduced the release. The authors conclude that the introduction of adrenaline as a false transmitter „revealed the existence of a β-adrenoceptor-mediated positive feedback mechanism in this tissue.“ The interest in the discovery stems from the possibility that it explains part of the antihypertensive effect of beta blockers. In hypertension adrenaline from the adrenal medulla, getting enriched in sympathetic axon terminals, might create a pathological positive feedback with excessive release of sympathetic transmitter; beta blockers might bring release down to normal levels.

The pharmacology of angiotensin und adenosine, their receptors and their role in the pathogenesis of hypertension have been additional subjects in the Department of Pharmacology of Porto's Medical Faculty in the era of Guimarães.

== The Porto Meetings on Adrenergic Mechanisms ==
When the group in Porto found their main theme, they also initiated a series of meetings of similarly interested researchers, the Porto Meetings on Adrenergic Mechanisms. The first took place in 1970, with forty participants. Ten further meetings followed, in 1973, 1978, 1981, 1983, 1986, 1989, 1993, 1996, 2000 and 2003. The meetings were much smaller than the International Catecholamine Symposia begun in 1958. The Abstract book of the 1993 meeting contained 67 contributions, while that of the International Catecholamine Symposium of 1992 in Amsterdam contained 728. The exchange of ideas was more lively. Visitors also appreciated what was only loosely connected with the scientific sessions, in 1970 when ″people in Porto still understood by a coffee break a port break″, in 1973 ″Serafim Guimarães' Coimbra fados, the fabulous dinner given by the mayor of Amarante″, in 1989 ″the unanimous wish for scopolamine oder meclizine on the Douro valley serpentine tour.“

== Teaching ==
Guimarães’ supplemented his lectures by co-edition the textbook Terapêutica Medicamentosa e Suas Bases Farmacológicas (Medicines and their pharmacological basis), which appeared in six editions:

- First edition 1983, edited by von Garrett und Osswald;
- Second edition 1986, equally edited by Garrett und Osswald;
- Third edition 1999, edited by Garrett, Osswald und Guimarães;
- Fourth edition 2001, edited by Osswald und Guimarães;
- Fifth edition 2006, edited by Guimarães, Moura und Soares-da-Silva;
- Sixth edition 2014, equally edited by Guimarães, Moura und Soares-da-Silva. Porto, Porto Editora, ISBN 978-972-0-01794-9.

Guimarães has also written or co-authored several chapters, such as Sistema adrenérgico.

== Pupils ==
The following scientists obtained their Ph.D. under the supervision of Guimarães:

At the Medical Faculty of Porto:

- Fernando Augusto Andrade de Abreu Brandão (1980)
- Daniel Filipe Lima Moura (1988)
- José Pedro Lopes Nunes (1996)
- Manuel Joaquim Lopes Vaz da Silva (1996)
- Rosa Sousa Martins da Rocha Begonha (1999)
- Alberto Vieira da Mota (2004)
- Jorge Moreira Gonçalves (1991)
- Jorge Alberto de Barros Brandão Proença (1991)
- Helder Pinheiro (2003) –

At the Faculty of Pharmacy of the University of Coimbra:

- Isabel Vitória Neves de Figueiredo Santos Pereira (1998).

== Other activities ==
From 1983 to 1984 Guimarães was dean of the Medical Faculty of Porto, from 1984 to 1985 vice-rector of the University, from 1986 to 1988 founding member of the Federation of European Pharmacological Societies (EPHAR), and from 1995 to 1998 president of the Sociedade Portuguesa de Farmacologia. From 1969 to 2000 he served as medical director of the spa of Monfortinho in the municipality Idanha-a-Nova, from 1972 to 1995 as counsellor of the pharmaceutical company Bial.

He is president of the advisory board of the Hospital de São João, the hospital of the Medical Faculty of the University of Porto, and president of the Liga dos Amigos do São João, the friends of the Hospital. He is a member of the advisory board for the Castelo da Feira, the Castle of Santa Maria da Feira.

He used his talent for drawing in the book, mentioned above, Retratos legendados. He published the history of the Castelo da Feira in a book, printed in 1000 copies, Castelo de Santa Maria da Feira. Medicina, Arte e Vida. His most recent book is Os Outros.
