= Lúcia Guimarães =

Brazilian journalist

- Born: State of Rio de Janeiro
- Occupation: Culture journalist
- Years active: 1985–

Lúcia Guimarães is a Brazilian journalist. While based largely in New York, she became a frequent contributor to Brazilian television, print, and radio media on the culture of the United States and events in American politics. She has been a columnist at Folha de São Paulo and O Estado de S. Paulo and a producer at Rede Globo, and she contributed to the talk show Manhattan Connection for 16 years.

== Career ==
Guimarães is from the state of Rio de Janeiro, and she moved to New York City in 1985. There, she worked as the international editor at Rede Globo, a producer of the Jornal Nacional, and a producer for the journalist Paulo Francis. From 1992 to 1993 she was an editor and producer at Reuters.

In 1993, Guimarães became a correspondent on the network TV Cultura. When the GNT and Globosat talk show Manhattan Connection was created in 1993, she became a presenter and producer at the show. At Manhattan Connection, Guimarães was primarily responsible for culture segments, and she remained there for 16 years. In 2008 Guimarães left Manhattan Connection to work for another GNT journalism program, Saia Justa (Pt).

In addition to her television work, Guimarães has been a contributor to several print publications. As a contributor to the newspaper O Estado de S. Paulo, Guimarães regularly produced columns every two weeks.

In 2020, Guimarães became a weekly columnist for Folha de São Paulo. For Folha, she covers international politics and particularly events in the United States. She also contributes to Mara Luquet (Pt) and Antonio Pedro Tabet's independent news channel, MyNews.

Guimarães has also worked at Bravo, and contributed to the magazine Playboy. She has made regular appearances on the radio show Estadão no Ar 1st Edition, particularly on American culture and developments in American politics. She has also contributed to news media from Portugal, including Diário de Notícias.

As a culture reporter who left Brazil for the United States in 1985, Guimarães has described her role in terms of exilados voluntários (volunteer exiles), who delivers news about New York to Brazilians but is also able to see Brazilian politics and culture from an unusual vantage point. From this angle, she has also written pieces about developments in Brazilian politics and culture for both a Brazilian audience and an American one.

Guimarães appeared in the film Caro Francis, which depicts the life of Paulo Francis, with whom Guimarães worked closely.
