= Falck-Hillarp method of fluorescence =

The Falck-Hillarp method of fluorescence (the F-H method) is a technique that makes it possible to demonstrate and study, with unique precision and susceptibility, certain monoamines, among those the three catecholamines dopamine, noradrenaline, and adrenaline, as well as serotonin and related substances.

The method is based on the important and decisive discovery that these compounds are able to react with formaldehyde – in near complete absence of water – to form fluorophores, i.e. molecules that, when irradiated with light invisible to the eye, will emit visible light. This happens in a “dry” state, without extracting the monoamines from the cells during the entire procedure, a process that starts with separation of a tissue sample and ends with a thin tissue slice that can be examined in a fluorescence microscope.

The F-H method allowed, for the first time, the examiner to watch these monoamines light up in the microscope and to precisely determine in which cells they were present, and thereby understanding their functions. The method was developed by Bengt Falck and Nils-Åke Hillarp in the 1960s at the Department of Histology, University of Lund. For intense neurobiological research it became possible to demonstrate the presence of monoamines in nerve cells belonging to the central and the peripheral nervous system and for the first time comprehend that these substances act as signal substances, i.e. transmitters.

The initial publication, written already in 1961, described a wide-ranging examination of nerves supplying a large number of organs in the body. This work validated the concept of Ulf von Euler, the Nobel prize winner, that noradrenaline is the signal substance in peripheral autonomic nerves. In the same year, this first publication was followed by an explanation of the chemical background of the F–H method.

Very thin membranes, such as the rat iris or mesentery, do not have to be sectioned for microscopic studies but may simply be spread on glass, dried, and then exposed to gaseous formaldehyde for subsequent study with a fluorescence microscope.

The publication on the chemical background was later named among "The 200 Most-Cited Papers of All Time".

In 2012, the Faculty of Medicine at the University of Lund arranged a symposium “From Nerve to Pills” celebrating the 50th anniversary of the initial publication of the F-H method.
