= Igreja de Santa Maria do Castelo (Tavira) =

Church in Tavira Municipality, Faro District, Portugal

Coordinates: 37.1253°N 7.6519°W

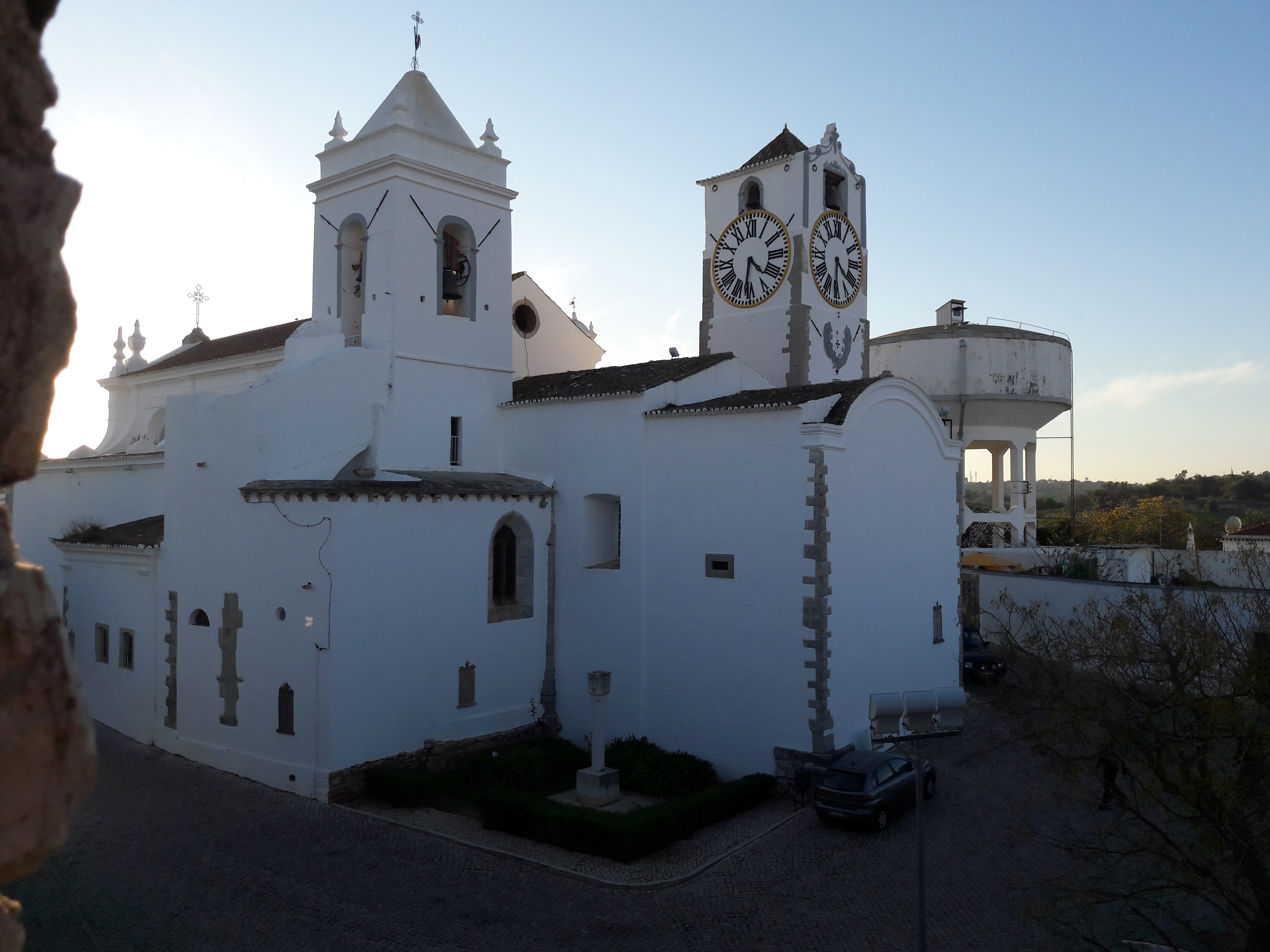
Church of Santa Maria do Castelo

Igreja de Santa Maria do Castelo is a church in Tavira, Portugal. It is classified as a National Monument.

It is believed this church was built in the 13th century after the Reconquista of the city of Tavira from Moors. The church was built as an initiative of the Order of Santiago (1242) by D. Paio Peres Correia to replace an Arab mosque. The mosque is believed to have served the area when Tavira had been a moorish Medina (fortified city). Archeological evidence of the mosque has not yet come to light. However, in 1718, a tomb was found with a corpse and an alfange, a type of Moorish sword. At the time, it was decided to bury the body again with the alfange.

== See also ==
- Tavira
- List of former mosques in Portugal
