= Djalma Guimarães =

Brazilian geochemist

- Born: November 5, 1894; Santa Luzia, Minas Gerais, Brazil
- Died: October 10, 1973 (aged 78); Belo Horizonte, Minas Gerais, Brazil
- Scientific career
- Fields: Geology
- Workplaces: Universidade Federal de Minas Gerais

Djalma Guimarães (November 5, 1894 – October 10, 1973), was a Brazilian geochemist. He was Professor Emeritus at the Ouro Preto Mining School (now part of the Federal University of Ouro Preto) and at the Federal University of Minas Gerais, in Belo Horizonte. At both institutions, he taught geological sciences for over 35 years.

He was a grandson of Councillor Joaquim Caetano da Silva Guimarães and of the Senator Manoel Teixeira da Costa. Guimarães was brought up in a family which had produced such Brazilian writers as Bernardo Guimarães and Alphonsus de Guimaraens. He was also a nephew of scientists Pandiá Calógeras and Paul Ferrand.

== Career ==
Guimarães' interest in mineralogy, petrography and geology was inspired during his student years at the Ouro Preto Mining School by the lessons and assignments given by Professor Costa Sena. He graduated in 1919 from this school with the title of Civil, Mining and Metallurgical Engineer. His first prize was a study trip to Europe. His traveling companion was engineer Israel Pinheiro, who about 40 years later was a governor of the state of Minas Gerais, after doing managerial work for the construction of Brasília, Brazil's specially planned national capital city, from 1956 to 1960.

Guimarães' first professional assignment was not in the branch of geology, but rather in the construction of what is now Rui Barbosa Avenue through the old Viúva hill in Rio de Janeiro, then the capital of Brazil. Guimarães published over 200 papers, books and memoirs, and gave numerous conferences. Three books have been published as tributes to him by his former students and collaborators. One of these is Contributions to Geology and Petrology (1985). This book probably lists all works produced by Guimarães, either as the sole author or in collaboration with other scholars, from 1924 to 1978. The book was financed by CBMM (Companhia Brasileira de Metalurgia e Mineração), which owns the world's largest niobium ore (pyrochlore) mine, in the Barreiro area of Araxá, Minas Gerais. This ore reserve was discovered by Guimarães and his team when he was the Head of Geology of the former Geological Survey of Minas Gerais (1931–1932). CBMM created the Djalma Guimarães Medal to be granted to the best geologist graduated at either the Ouro Preto Mining School or the UFMG Institute of Geosciences in Belo Horizonte.

Guimarães described four new minerals: eschwegite; arrojadite; pennaite and giannettite.

== Selected works ==
- Uranium-bearing minerals of Brazil (14th International Geological Congress, Madrid, 1926, Comptes Rendus, vol., 4, p. 1789–1794).
- Upland diamonds deposits, Diamantina District, Minas Gerais (Economic Geology, New Haven, 1929, vol., 24, p. 444-447).
- Das Problem der Granitbildung (Chemie der Erde, Jena, 1938, vol. 12 p. 83-94).
- Mineral Deposits of magmatic origin. (Economic Geology, Lancaster, 1947, vol. 42, p. 45-57).See: .
- Age determination of quartz veins and pegmatites in Brazil.(Economic Geol., Lancaster, 1948, vol. 53, no. 2).
- Report of niobium (columbium) ore deposit of Barreiro, Araxá, Minas Gerais, Brazil. Departamento Nacional da Produção Mineral, Open file report, 1955.
- Geologia do Brasil. Brasil. Departamento Nacional da Produção Mineral, Rio de Janeiro,1964, Memória 1, 674 p.
- Princípios de metalgonêse e geologia econômica do Brasil. Departamento Nacional da Produção Mineral, Rio de Janeiro, 1965, 625p.
- Gênese da Bacia Amazônica. Revista da Escola de Minas, Ouro Preto, 1971, vol.29, no.1 p. 24-26.

== Honors ==
Guimarães was a member of the Brazilian National Research Council and of the country's Nuclear Energy Commission. In his honor, a radioactive mineral composed of a tantalate of uranium and calcium was given the name djalmaite (uranmicrolite, discredited 2010) by the geologist Octavio Barbosa. Also in his honor, at Praça da Liberdade (Liberty Square) in Belo Horizonte there is a Professor Djalma Guimarães Museum of Mineralogy (now part of a larger Museum of Mining and Metals).
