= Jonas Guimarães =

Brazilian politician (born 1951)

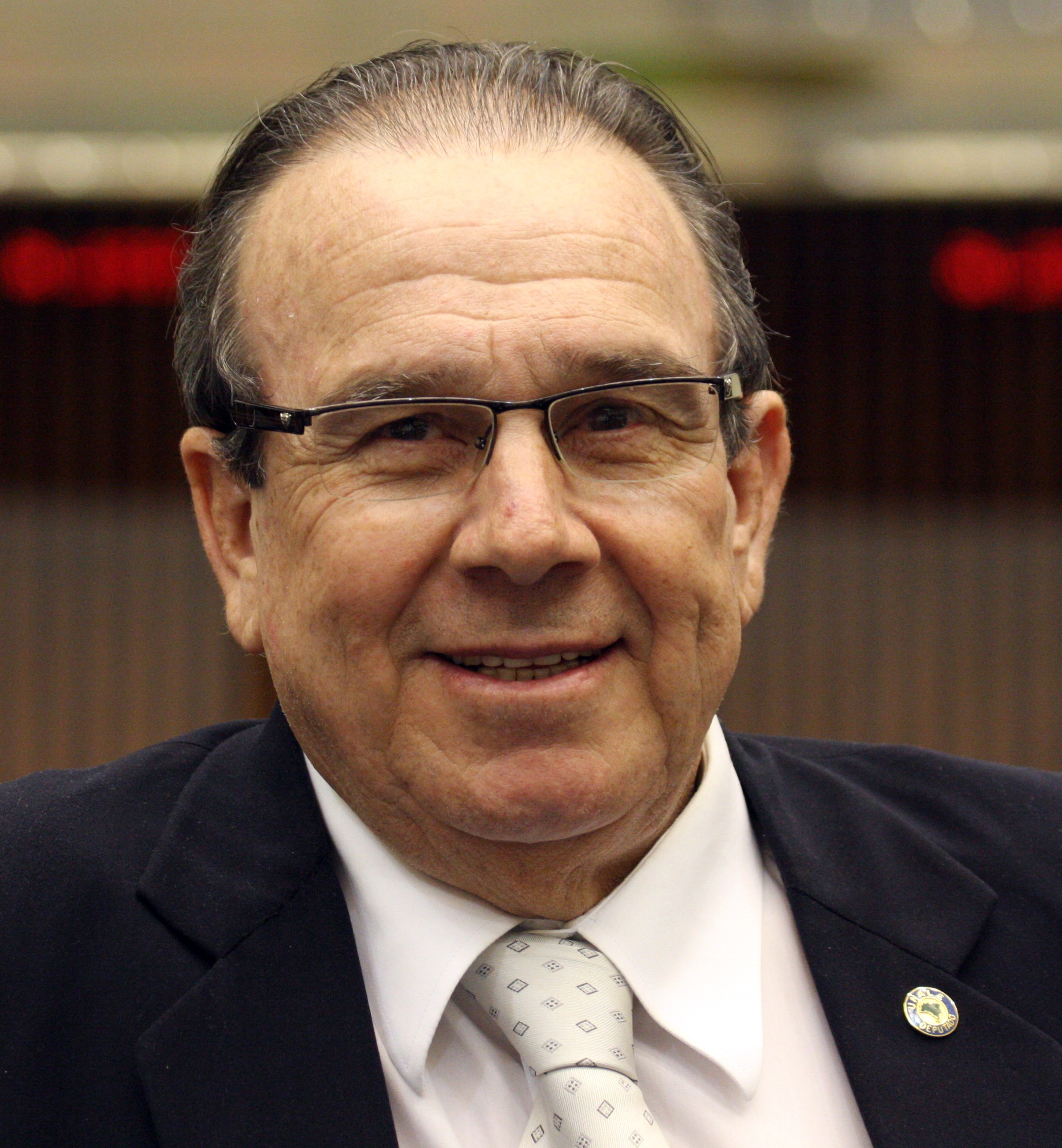
- Guimarães in October 2011

State Deputy for Paraná
- Incumbent
- Assumed office 1 February 2007

Personal details
- Born: 7 May 1951 (age 73); Lavínia, SP, Brazil
- Political party: PSB (2016–); PMDB (2000–2016)

Jonas Guimarães (born 7 May 1951) is a Brazilian businessman and politician. Although born in São Paulo, he has spent his political career representing Paraná, having served in the state legislature since 2007.

== Personal life ==
Guimarães is an evangelical Christian and member of the Christian Congregation in Brazil. Before entering politics Guimarães worked in business. His brother Edno Guimarães is the former mayor of Cianorte.

== Political career ==
In 2016 Guimarães was one of 6 local politicians who left the Brazilian Democratic Movement over disagreements of how it was being run in the state of Paraná with its leader Roberto Requião, and joined the Brazilian Socialist Party.

In March 2019, he was convicted by the 2nd Public Treasury Court of Curitiba, for administrative impropriety, for the irregular use of the editor of the Legislative Assembly of Paraná, when he printed banknotes for his own use.
