= José Guimarães =

José Guimarães may refer to:

- José Carlos Guimarães (born 1964), former Angolan basketball player and current coach
- José Guimarães (fencer) (born 1965), Portuguese fencer
- José Guimarães (politician) (born 1959)
- Zé Roberto (born José Roberto Lages Guimarães; 1954), Brazilian former volleyball player and current coach
- Zezé (born José Carlos Guimarães; 1899), Brazilian footballer
