= Bengt Falck =

Swedish scientist (1927–2023)

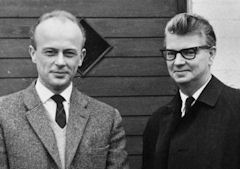
- Falck (left) with Nils-Åke Hillarp, 1963
- Born: 16 January 1927; Malmö, Sweden
- Died: 16 July 2023 (aged 96)
- Occupation: Swedish neuroscientist

Bengt Olof Torsten Falck (16 January 1927 – 16 July 2023) was a Swedish scientist, who was professor emeritus at the Faculty of Medicine at Lund University, Sweden. Falck has published numerous works in the fields of histology, endocrinology and neurobiology.

== Personal life ==
Bengt Falck was the son of Hans Falck, city court judge in Malmö, Sweden, and Maria Hagander. He married Eva Torp in 1951, and together they had four children. In 1994 he married Inger Vestvik.

Falck died on 16 July 2023, at the age of 96.

== Scientific career ==
Falck became Doctor of Medical Science, equivalent of PhD, in 1959. His thesis focused on the production of estrogen in the ovaries, and he attempted to show that this production is dependent on an interplay of two different hormone producing systems. His hypothesis has come to be called "Falck's two-cell hypothesis of oestrogen synthes". Between 1960 and 1970 he acted as associate professor, before becoming a full professor of histology in 1970, all at the University of Lund, Sweden.

In 1960–61 Falck and Nils-Åke Hillarp developed the Falck-Hillarp fluorescence method. This technique made it possible to study biologically active substances called monoamines – dopamine, noradrenaline, adrenaline and serotonin – on the cellular level employing fluorescence microscope. Consequently, it was then possible to demonstrate their presence in the central as well as peripheral nervous system. Thereby, it could be established that these monoamines were actually functioning as interneuronal transmitters (signal substances). The method has since its development been used several times, within fields such as dermatology and histochemistry. The publication on the chemical background was named among the 200 most cited papers of all time in 1991, and had at the time been cited 2,435 times.

In 2012, the Faculty of Medicine at the University of Lund arranged a symposium “From Nerve to Pills” celebrating the 50th anniversary of the initial publication of the F-H method. In 2004 his latest publication ”Mediated exodus of L-Dopa from human epidermal Langerhans cells", was published.
