= Guimaras (disambiguation) =

Guimaras is an island province in the Philippines.

Guimaras may also refer to:

- Guimaras oil spill
- Guimaras State University
- Guimaras Strait

== See also ==
- Guimarães
