= Annica Dahlström =

Swedish neuroscientist

Annica Dahlström (born 1941) is a Swedish physician and Professor Emerita of Histology and Neuroscience at the Department of Medical Chemistry and Cell Biology at University of Gothenburg.

Dahlström's research focuses on how nerve cells store and transport signals, but she has also published research on many other areas of histology and neuroscience. She earned her doctorate at 25 as the youngest Swedish physician to earn a doctorate. She was Professor of Histology and Neuroscience at University of Gothenburg from 1983 until her 2008 retirement.

Dahlström has taken part in the debate on the relationship between gender and brain function. In 2007, she published the book Könet sitter i hjärnan (The gender is in the brain), which she described as a concentrate of the last 15 years of international research on the brain and how the brain affects human behavior. This book, mostly referencing studies performed before 1990, has been publicly criticized for inaccuracies.

Her most cited scientific paper, "Evidence for the existence of monoamine-containing neurons in the central nervous system," was cited over 5,500 times as of 2013. Dahlström has published over 340 scientific papers.
