= Rodolfo Guimarães =

Portuguese Mathematician and Army Officer

Rodolfo Guimarães OSE OA
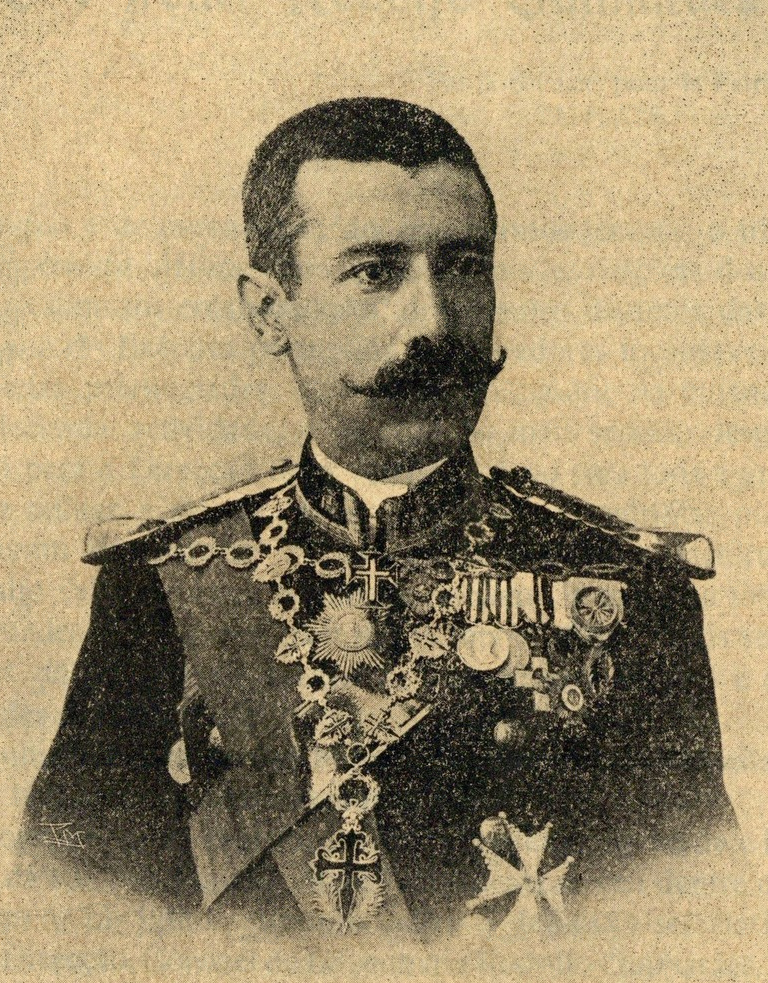
- Born: Rodolfo Ferreira Dias Guimarães; 4 January 1866; Porto, Portugal
- Died: 9 July 1918 (aged 52); Lisbon, Portugal
- Notable work: Les Mathématiques en Portugal au XIX^{e} Siècle (1900)

Rodolfo Ferreira Dias Guimarães (4 January 1866 – 9 July 1918) was a Portuguese army officer and a leading historian of mathematics. Rodolfo Guimarães attained the rank of colonel, and taught at the Army School.

Rodolfo Guimarães was born in Porto in 1866, the son of Augusto Dias Guimarães and Teresa Amélia Ferreira Dias, who, by his own account, made a great deal of sacrifice to ensure he had access to good education. He enrolled at the Lisbon Polytechnic School in 1883.

Guimarães published his first two papers on mathematics while still a student, in 1885. Early in his research career he published papers on geometry, but from 1900 onward he was mainly concerned with the history of Portuguese mathematics. His seminal work, Les Mathématiques en Portugal au XIX^{e} Siècle, published that year, was a groundbreaking bibliography of Portuguese mathematical works according to the norms of the 1889 International Congress of Bibliography of Mathematical Sciences. Its first edition earned a favourable review from Gustav Eneström.

By compiling lists of existing works and reprinting rare papers, Guimarães had an important role in the preservation of mathematical works connected with leading Portuguese mathematicians, chief among them Pedro Nunes whom he considered the most outstanding Portuguese mathematician; Nunes was the subject of a considerable number of papers authored by Guimarães.

== Distinctions ==
=== National orders ===
- Officer of the Order of Aviz
- Officer of the Order of Saint James of the Sword

=== Foreign orders ===
- Knight Cross of the Order of Charles III (Spain)
- Knight's Cross of the Order of Isabella the Catholic (Spain)
- Cross of the Order of Military Merit, with White Decoration (Spain)
- Officer of Public Instruction of the Order of Academic Palms (France)
- Commander of the Order of the Star of Romania (Romania)
