= Trendelenburg =

Trendelenburg could refer to:

- Ernst Trendelenburg (1882–1945), German politician
- Friedrich Adolf Trendelenburg (1802–1872), German philosopher and philologist
- Friedrich Trendelenburg (1844–1924), German surgeon
- Paul Trendelenburg (1841–1931), German pharmacologist
- Wilhelm Trendelenburg (1877–1946), German physiologist
