= Ernst Trendelenburg =

German politician and civil servant (1882-1945)

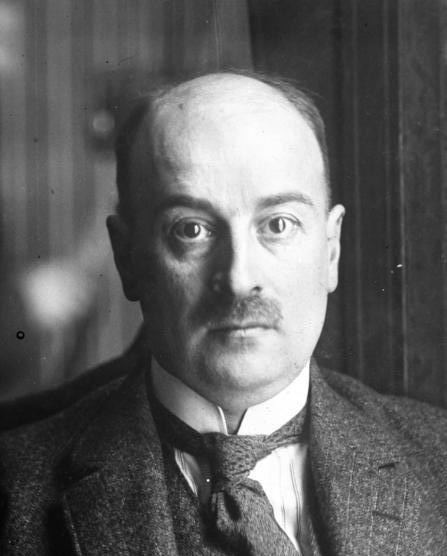
- Trendelenburg in 1932.

Reich Minister of Economics
- In office June 27, 1930 – 8 October 1931
- President: Paul von Hindenburg
- Chancellor: Heinrich Brüning
- Preceded by: Hermann Dietrich
- Succeeded by: Hermann Warmbold
- In office May 6, 1932 – 30 May 1932
- Preceded by: Hermann Warmbold
- Succeeded by: Hermann Warmbold

State Secretary in the Reich Ministry of Economics
- In office 1923–1932
- Chancellor: Gustav Stresemann; Hans Luther; Wilhelm Marx; Hermann Müller; Heinrich Brüning

Head of the Reich Group Industry
- In office 1935–1936

Personal details
- Born: February 13, 1882 Rostock, Grand Duchy of Mecklenburg-Schwerin, German Empire
- Died: 28 April 1945 (aged 63) Berlin-Dahlem, Gau Berlin, Nazi Germany
- Party: DDP (1918-1930); Independent (1930-1945)
- Relatives: Friedrich Trendelenburg (father); Paul Trendelenburg (brother); Wilhelm Trendelenburg (brother); Ullrich Georg Trendelenburg (nephew); Friedrich Adolf Trendelenburg (grandfather)
- Education: University of Greifswald
- Occupation: Lawyer

Ernst Trendelenburg (13 February 1882 - 28 April 1945) was a German politician and civil servant of the DDP and later an independent politician in the Weimar Republic. He most notably served as Reich Minister of Economics for two terms, serving from 1930 to 1931 and as acting minister in 1932. Prior to this, he had served for 9 years as a State Secretary in the Reich Ministry of Economics. Trendelenburg was also briefly Head of the Reich Group Industry from 1935 to 1936 in Nazi Germany.

Ernst Trendelenburg was born in Rostock on 13 February 1882, to surgeon Friedrich Trendelenburg. The Trendelenburgs had been a notable family as philologists and philosophers prior. He studied law during college, graduating from the University of Greifswald. After graduating, he was an unskilled worker, but eventually rose in the ranks when he transferred to the Reich Ministry of Economics in 1917 while being a senior member of the Kaiser Wilhelm Society (KWG). He joined the DDP in 1918, and a year later was appointed Reichskommissar for Import and Export Permits, but he later went back to the Ministry of Economics, where he became State Secretary until 1932. Later that year, he became Under-Secretary General to the League of Nations, where he helped lay the foundations for economics, but he resigned after a year following Germany's withdrawal from the league.

In June 1930 he was appointed Reich Minister of Economics by chancellor Heinrich Brüning, due to him being non-partisan and supporting Brüning's policies. His time there saw the start of the European banking crisis of 1931. He supported foreign competition and breaking up cartels, and criticized government regulations on the economy. He left this role in October 1931, but served as acting minister in May 1932. After leaving, he served as Chairman of Vereinigte Industrieunternehmungen AG (VIAG) and Reichs-Kredit-Gesellschaft, but did not join the NSDAP although he worked closely with the Nazi regime. He was appointed Head of the Reichsgruppe Industrie for a year starting in 1935, and was later briefly Head of the Reich Iron Association (RVE) in 1942. He committed suicide in 1945 by overdosing on Veronal, a sleeping aid, after the rape of his daughter following the Battle of Berlin by Russian soldiers.

== Early life ==
Ernst Trendelenburg was born on 13 February 1882 in Rostock, then part of the Grand Duchy of Mecklenburg-Schwerin in the German Empire. He was the son of Friedrich Trendelenburg, a prominent surgeon, and Charlotte Fabricius. Trendelenburg had four brothers who were Wilhelm, Paul, Friedrich, and Ferdinand. Their paternal grandfather was Friedrich Adolf Trendelenburg, a philosopher and philologist, who specialized in Aristotelianism and German idealism.

He initially attended the Städtisches Gymnasium in Bonn, but then transferred to the St. Thomas School in Leipzig. He completed his abitur in 1900. After Trendelenburg completed his abitur, he studied medicine for a brief period, but in 1901 he began studying law at the universities of Bonn and Leipzig. In 1903 he began a clerkship. In 1904 he graduated from the University of Greifswald with a doctorate in law, with a thesis on the acquisition of property by representatives through common law and the German Civil Code.

In 1908 he became an unskilled worker in the Reich Ministry of Justice. He later went to the Reich Office of the Interior, prior to 1917. During this time, from 1912 to 1920, he was also Secretary General of the Kaiser Wilhelm Society (KWG), a scientific institution. In 1917 he went to the newly-created Reich Ministry of Economics as a counsellor. By April 1918 he had risen to being Privy Councillor and Lecturer Councillor. In his time at the ministry in the late 1910s, he often worked closely with Wichard von Moellendorf, helping to negotiate with the Zentralarbeitsgemeinschaft (Central Working Group). As an official of the Office of Economics, he also participated in the Brussels International Financial Conference of 1920.

== Political career ==
=== Early career ===
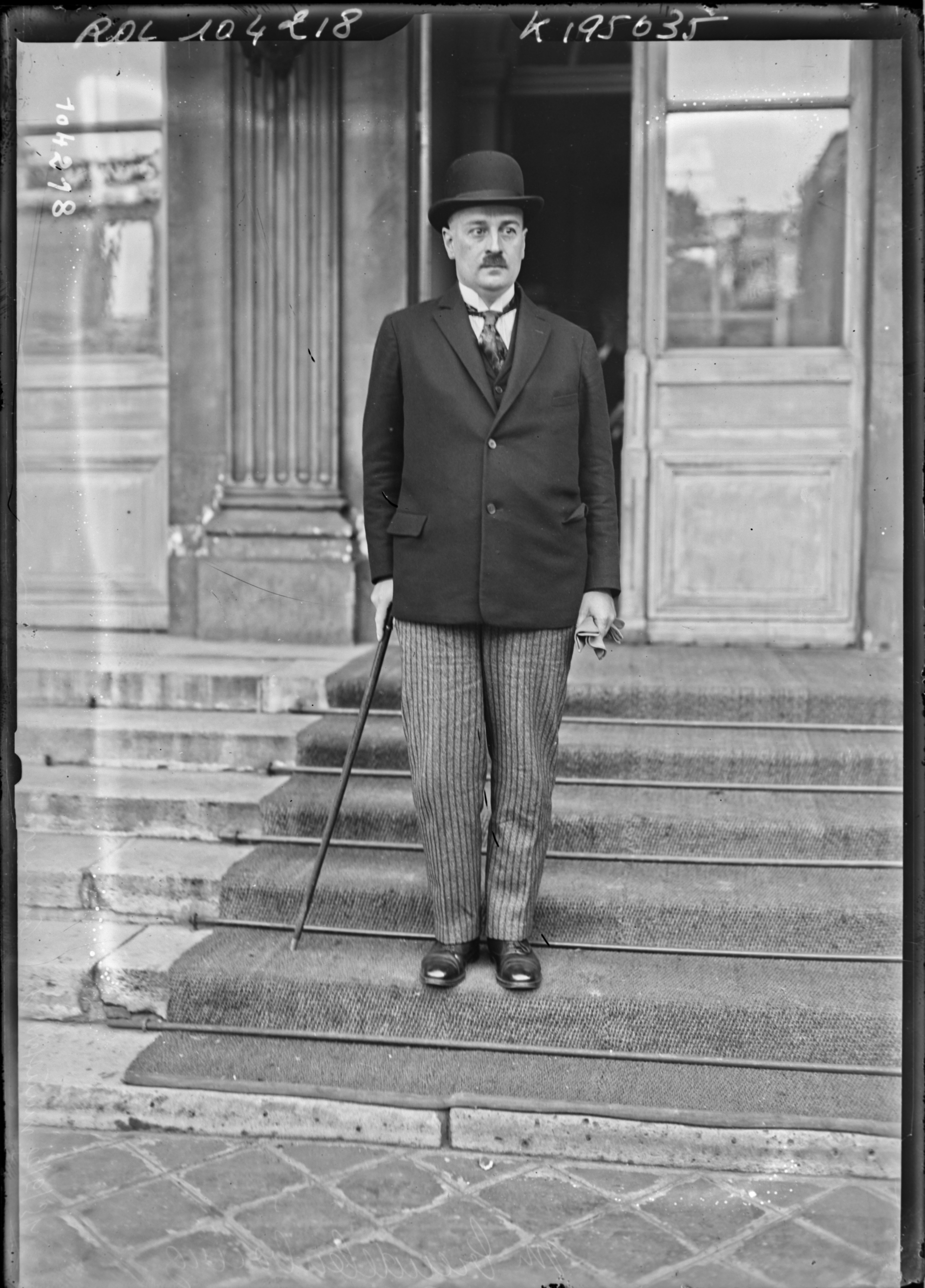
Trendelenburg in 1925 at an interview for the economic relations between France and Germany in the Ministry of Commerce in Paris.

After World War One, he joined the DDP in 1918. A year later, in 1919, he became Reichskommissar for Import and Export Permits, a position he held until 1922. He also monitored foreign commerce while serving as Reichskommissar because he was convinced that the low value of the Reichsmark would lead to the selling of goods from foreign investors and said that state regulations would ensure that Germany was not at a disadvantage. In September 1922, he was appointed Ministerial Director in charge of Department II, the Industrial Department, of the Reich Ministry of Economics. After this, he was appointed State Secretary in the Reich Ministry of Economics a year later, an important position he would hold until 1932. In this role he was responsible for industrial bonds in response to the passing of the Dawes Plan. He also opposed any raise in premiums at the height of unemployment, contrary to experts who called for a raise of 0.5%.

In 1932 he was appointed Under-Secretary General, representing Germany, to the League of Nations. In this role he laid the foundations for the economics of the League of Nations and helped create the World Economic Conference, but had very little success because of the lasting World War One economies and nationalism. On 21 October 1933 Germany withdrew from the League of Nations, and as a consequence Trendelenburg also announced his resignation. He was also Chairman of the Geneva Economic Committee at the League of Nations during this time.

=== Reich Minister of Economics ===
On 27 June 1930 he took over the Reich Ministry of Economics, which was non-partisan and supported then-chancellor Heinrich Brüning, but which would not win over support in the Reichstag. He considered a reduction in the cost of living to be possible only if food prices were to go down, because there was a lack of confidence in public finances. He instead suggested allowing foreign competition, breaking up cartels and having wage reductions. He urged the entire cabinet to require the negotiation of labor contracts, saying that trade unions shared responsibility for lowering wages that led to reduced unemployment, a statement that was harshly criticized by workers. He also believed that government regulations on the economy needed to be loosened. He resigned his first term on 8 October 1931, and was succeeded by Hermann Warmbold.

He again returned as acting minister from 6 May to 30 May 1932 after Warmbold resigned.

=== Later career and Nazi collaboration ===
In 1934 he became Chairman of the Supervisory Boards Vereinigte Industrieunternehmungen AG (VIAG), a conglomerate for industrial holdings, and the state-owned bank Reichs-Kredit-Gesellschaft. Although not a member of the NSDAP, instead remaining independent, he worked closely with the Nazi Party especially because of its influence on the VIAG.

In 1935 he was appointed Head of the Reichsgruppe Industrie, which represented the interests of the German industry, which he continued until a year later. He was also the first honorary head of the Export Community for War Equipment (AGK) during this time, which was then a department of the Reichsgruppe, which was a collaboration between the Waffenamt and the Reich Economic Office to act as a self-governing body of the armaments industry and promote arms exports. That same year he joined the Reich Chamber of Commerce in Berlin, and served on the Joint Committee established to stabilize the international economic situation.

Over the following years, he would stay as chairman of VIAG. He notably criticized the Anglo-American Treaty of 1938, as he questioned whether it was really serving reconstruction and friendly cooperation, and was instead having a policy of high protectionism which he said caused the Great Depression. In 1942, upon the creation of the Reich Iron Association (RVE), he served briefly as its head.

== Personal life ==
He was married to Cläre, the daughter of physician Gustav Schaede. He had three children: Karin, Peter, and another daughter. After Karin, Ernst, and Cläre committed suicide, the other daughter would follow a year later, and Peter later moved to the United States.

== Death ==
Ernst, Cläre, and Karin committed suicide following their code of honor after their 16-year daughter, Karin, was raped after the Battle of Berlin by Russian soldiers. They committed suicide by overdosing on Veronal, a common sleeping aid.
