= Paul Zoll =

American cardiologist (1911–1999)

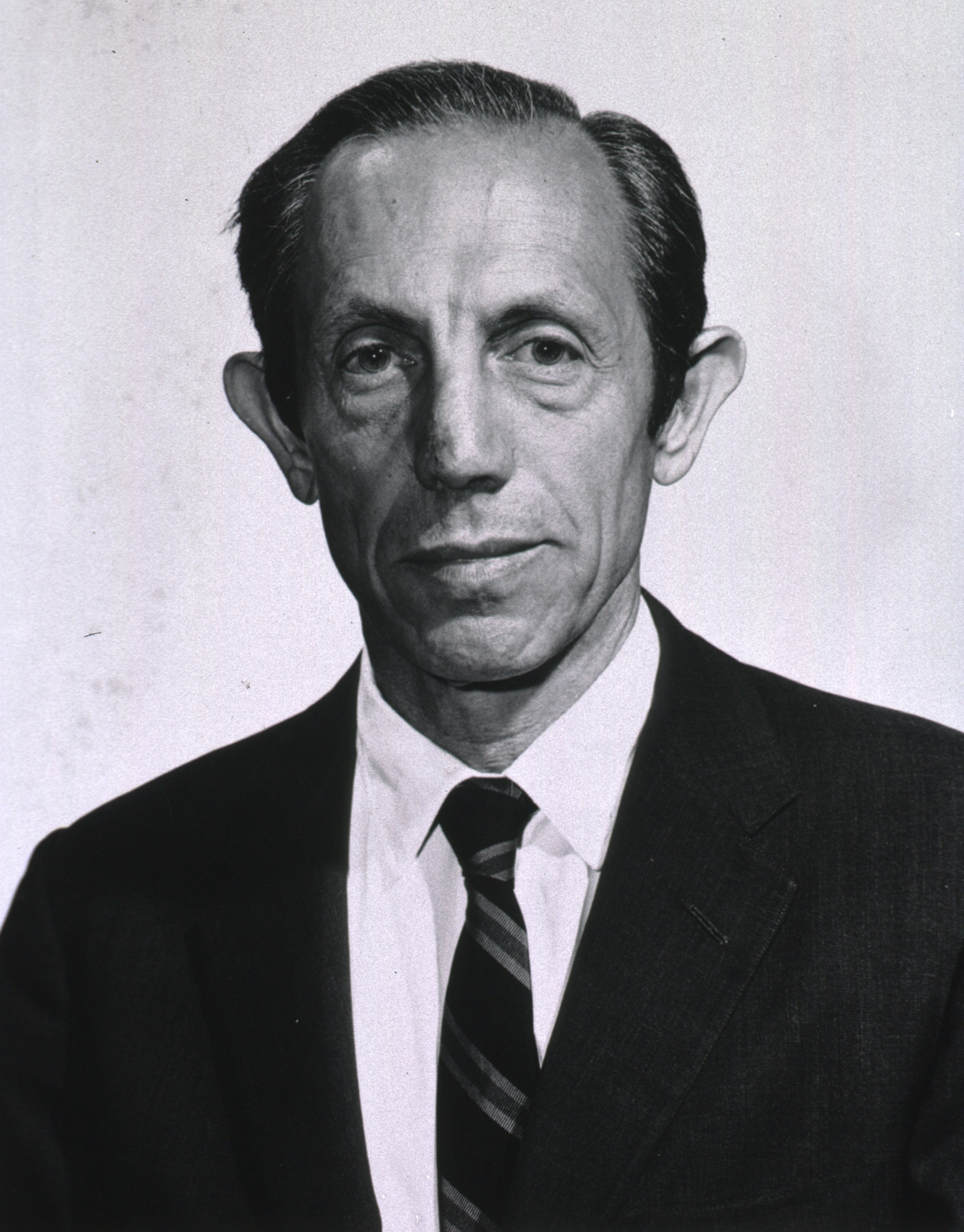
- Born: Paul Maurice Zoll; July 15, 1911; Boston, Massachusetts
- Died: January 5, 1999 (aged 87); Chestnut Hill, Massachusetts
- Occupation: Cardiologist
- Known for: Development of the artificial cardiac pacemaker and cardiac defibrillator

Paul Maurice Zoll (July 15, 1911 – January 5, 1999) was a Jewish American cardiologist and one of the pioneers in the development of the artificial cardiac pacemaker and cardiac defibrillator.

== Early life ==
Zoll's parents were Hyman and Mollie Zoll. They met in the United States after emigrating from Eastern Europe. Hyman's roots were in Lithuania and Mollie's in Belarus. They settled in the Boston district of Roxbury, Massachusetts. Hyman worked with his father and brother in the family leather business. Mollie, in addition to being a homemaker, worked in her one-room home office electrolysis treatment center. The couple was Jewish and devoutly observant of their religion's customs and rituals. They were parents of two boys, Herbert and Paul. Both attended religious school and, at thirteen years, had a Bar Mitzvah to celebrate their transition to manhood in the Jewish community.

Zoll graduated from Boston Latin School in 1928. He followed his brother to Harvard College. He majored in psychology with aspirations of remaining in academics. Because his brother had problems securing a teaching position, his mother feared that he would suffer the same fate and suggested a career in medicine.

Zoll graduated from Harvard College summa cum laude in 1932 and entered Harvard Medical School. Because of their high academic standing, he was able to spend a portion of his senior year engaged in cardiac research with Soma Weiss at the medical school.

Zoll's mother died during his last year of medical school. That event had lasting personal repercussions; his mother was believed to suffer from rheumatic heart disease and from an underlying congenital heart defect. On several occasions, Mollie requested that a post-mortem autopsy be performed to clarify the cause when she died and to help others. Hyman disregarded his wife's wishes and his son's arguments because autopsy was a religious prohibition. Zoll dissociated himself from his religious roots and never returned.

After graduation in 1936, he interned at Beth Israel Hospital. He then completed a one-year medical residency at Bellevue Hospital in New York City and returned to Beth Israel Hospital as a Macy Research Fellow to study the pathophysiology of coronary disease.

== Military service ==
In World War II, Zoll served as an army physician from 1941 to 1946. He was deployed to the Aleutians and then to England, where he became Chief of Medicine at the 160th General Hospital that was designated for wounded military evacuees with chest injuries. Zoll removed bullets and shrapnel from in and around the hearts and great vessels of 138 soldiers without a fatality.

== Career ==
After the war, Zoll resumed his research work with coronary disease and continued to care for cardiac patients at Beth Israel Hospital. A life-changing event affected Zoll in 1947 when a woman directly under his care who suffered from fainting spells caused by increasingly prolonged periods of cardiac arrest, died. An autopsy revealed that her only heart abnormality was a faulty electrical system. Zoll remembered what he learned practicing in the military with Harken - that the hearts of the wounded contracted from the slightest stimulus during surgery. With this in mind, Zoll embarked on a mission to develop electrical methods to prevent sudden arrhythmic death. After proving that his discoveries were superior to established methods, he had to defend them when other techniques emerged. A sampling of controversies that engulfed Zoll includes his technique of closed chest resuscitation versus open chest rescue; his application of alternating current countershock versus direct current cardioversion; and his preference for open chest long-term lead placement versus transvenous lead placement.

Zoll was helped by several colleagues who shared his goals and worked by his side. They were Alan Belgard, his sole engineer; surgeon Leona Norman Zarsky, who directed the animal research laboratory; Arthur Linenthal, cardiac pharmacologist and electrophysiologist; and Howard Frank, thoracic surgeon and pioneering partner in implanting long-term pacemakers.

Zoll succeeded in preventing life-threatening disturbances of heart rhythm and in restoring effective heart action to victims about to die from sudden cardiac arrest. He accomplished these feats with the application of indirect and direct electrical shocks that restored a life-sustaining heart rhythm. Because of his methods, he has been called "The Father of Modern Cardiac Therapy". Still today there is an annual toll of approximately 450,000 sudden arrhythmic deaths in the USA alone. Zoll was a pioneer with a panoramic wide-angle view of his patient’s needs gleaned from his office and bedside hospital practice. During his career, Zoll equally divided his time between clinical care and research in his laboratory. His first in-the-world milestones resulted in paradigm shifts in cardiac care. Each conformed to the scientific "gold" standards with well-documented detailed published data of laboratory experiments and results in patients that were replicated by independent investigators. Among those milestones are chest surface pacing of an arrested heart in 1952; Clinical alarmed heart rhythm monitors in 1953; chest surface electrical shock ("defibrillation") to terminate life-threatening ventricular fibrillation in 1956; installation of a Zoll-Belgard- Electrodyne self-contained long term pacemaker in a child in 1960; and the introduction of a new concept that permitted "painless" chest surface pacing in 1982. The new device launched a small company that grew to be ZOLL Medical Corporation.

Zoll developed methods of applying electric shocks to the surface of the chest that stimulated the heart within. When the heart of his first clinical success ceased to beat because its native stimulus signal failed, Zoll saved the man by substituting a sequence of chest shocks produced by an experimental pacemaker borrowed from Otto Krayer of the Harvard Medical School Department of Physiology. The next year he collaborated with Alan Belgard, the chief electrical engineer and co-owner of the Electrodyne Company, to develop an efficient chest surface pacemaker to conform to Zoll's needs. That collaboration became long-term as together they developed production model chest surface pacemakers, clinical alarmed heart rhythm monitors, chest surface defibrillators, cardiac monitor-automatic pacemakers, and long-term implantable self-contained pacemakers.

He retired from practice in 1993. During his more than fifty years of active practice and research, Zoll received many awards and honors.

== Personal life ==
After completing his residency, Zoll married Janet Jones, whom he met while training at Bellevue. In 1948, they became parents of fraternal twins. Son Ross attended Harvard College and earned a graduate degree in physics at the University of Chicago. He then assisted Zoll in the laboratory and earned his M.D. at the University of Miami. Daughter Mary earned her Doctorate in biochemistry and taught at Northeastern University in Boston and Massachusetts Institute of Technology.

Janet died in 1978. Three years later, Zoll married Ann Blumgart Gurewich. Zoll died from pneumonia on January 5, 1999.

== Legacy ==
The descendants of Zoll's discoveries continue to evolve in the forms of alarmed cardiac monitors, pacemakers, and closed chest defibrillators. These machines continue to be the platform for all modern cardiac care units. Lightweight portable Automated External Defibrillators (AED) are mandated by federal and state authorities in many locations, including schools, commercial airplanes, airports, and health clubs. Since 2005, there have now wearable automatic defibrillators that need no direct medical interventions.
