= Ullrich Georg Trendelenburg =

German pharmacologist

Ullrich Georg Trendelenburg (31 December 1922 – 21 November 2006) was a German pharmacologist.

== Biography ==
He was born in Gehlsdorf (today part of Rostock). His paternal grandfather, Friedrich Trendelenburg (1844 to 1924) was the surgeon after whom Trendelenburg's sign for hip abductor weakness and the Trendelenburg test for varicose veins are named, whereas his father, Paul Trendelenburg (1884 to 1931), also was a pharmacologist. In the Institute of Pharmacology in Berlin led by his father, Ullrich got to know opponents of National Socialism such as Otto Krayer, Edith Bülbring and Marthe Vogt. In the Second World War, he volunteered for the Air force in order to escape the SS. After the war he studied medicine in Göttingen and Uppsala. From 1952 to 1956 he worked with Joshua Harold Burn (1892 to 1982) in the Department of Pharmacology of the University of Oxford as a British Council Scholar and from 1957 to 1968 with Otto Krayer at the Department of Pharmacology of Harvard Medical School. From 1968 to 1991 he held the chair of pharmacology at the University of Würzburg. After his retirement he moved to Tübingen where he lived until his death and where he received lifelong friends such as the Portuguese pharmacologist Serafim Guimarães.

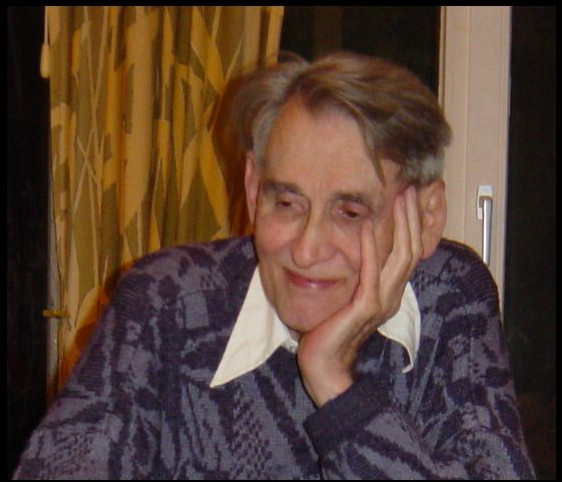
Tübingen December 1995

Trendelenburg’s main field of research was the pharmacology of the autonomic nervous system. He discovered new receptors at autonomic ganglion cells. He clarified mechanisms of hypersensitivity and subsensitivity to drugs, and his review of this subject became a citation classic. He also clarified the mode of action of direct-acting and indirect-acting sympathomimetic drugs. He identified pathways of inactivation of catecholamines in which a membrane transport protein and an enzyme are arranged in sequence. He termed such pathways "inactivating systems".

From 1975 to 1979 he was president of the German Pharmacological Society and from 1969 to 1991 editor — from 1977 to 1985 chief editor — of Naunyn-Schmiedeberg’s Archives of Pharmacology, the world's oldest still existing pharmacology journal.

Inspired by his friendship with persons such as Otto Krayer, he published biographies of pharmacologists who had been persecuted by National Socialism.

Trendelenburg was honorary member of the Polish, Indian, Czechoslovak, German and Venezuelan Pharmacological Societies and honorary doctor of the medical faculties of five universities: Tampere, Finland, Porto, Portugal, Ohio State University, Lublin, Poland, and Prague. The German Pharmacologiocal Society awarded hin the Oswald Schmiedeberg medal, the highest scientific honor of the Society.

He died in Tübingen.
