= Trendelenburg gait =

Abnormal gait caused by weakness of the gluteus muscles

- Other names: Gluteus medius lurch
- Specialty: Neurology

Trendelenburg gait, first described by Friedrich Trendelenburg in 1895, is an abnormal human gait caused by an inability to maintain the pelvis level while standing on one leg. It is caused by weakness or ineffective action of the gluteus medius and gluteus minimus muscles.

Gandbhir and Rayi point out that the biomechanical action involved comprises a class 3 lever, where the lower limb's weight is the load, the hip joint is the fulcrum, and the lateral glutei, which attach to the antero-lateral surface of the greater trochanter of the femur, provide the effort. The causes can thus be categorized systematically as failures of this lever system at various points.

== Signs and symptoms ==
During the stance phase, or when standing on one leg, the weakened abductor muscles (gluteus medius and minimus) on the side of the supporting leg allow the opposite hip to droop. To compensate, the trunk lurches to the weakened side to maintain the center of gravity over the supporting leg. This produces a characteristic "waddling" gait.

Trendelenburg gait may be bilateral or unilateral. If, when standing on the right leg, the left hip drops, it is a positive right Trendelenburg sign (the opposite side drops because the hip abductors on the right side do not stabilize the pelvis to prevent the droop). When the patient walks, if he swings his body to the right to compensate for left hip drop, he will present with a compensated Trendelenburg gait. The patient exhibits an excessive lean in which the upper body is thrust to the right to keep the center of gravity over the stance leg.

== Causes ==
Trendelenburg gait is caused by weakness or ineffective action of the abductor muscles of the lower limb, the gluteus medius muscle and the gluteus minimus muscle.

- Damage to the motor nerve supply of the lateral gluteal muscles (gluteus medius muscle and gluteus minimus muscle)
  - Polio involving L5 (foot drop may also be seen because L5 innervates the tibialis anterior muscle)
  - Damage to the superior gluteal nerve
- Temporary or permanent weakness of the lateral glutei
  - Tendinitis
  - Penetrating trauma
  - Infection, abscess – bloodborne, post-traumatic or post-surgical
- Ineffective action (insufficient leverage) of the lateral glutei
  - Greater trochanteric avulsion injury
  - Fracture or non-union of the femoral neck
  - Coxa vara (the angle between the femoral neck head and shaft is less than 120 degrees)
- Damage to the hip joint (fulcrum); chronic or developmental hip dislocation/dysplasia
  - Avascular necrosis
  - Legg–Calvé–Perthes disease
  - Developmental dysplasia
  - Chronic infection
  - Uncorrected traumatic dislocation

== Treatment ==
Treatment is directed at the underlying cause. In addition, biofeedback and physical therapy are used to strengthen the muscles.

== See also ==
- Gait abnormality
- Gluteal gait
- Snapping hip syndrome
- Trendelenburg position
- Trendelenburg's sign
