= John Daniel Morell =

John Daniel Morell (18 June 1816 – 1 April 1891) was a British educationalist and Congregational minister.

== Life ==
Morell was born at Little Baddow, Essex, where his father was minister of the Congregational church (1799–1852). He went to Homerton College in 1833, where he studied theology under John Pye Smith. He then entered the University of Glasgow, where he took the M.A. degree in 1841. Subsequently he studied philosophy and theology under Fichte at Bonn, and returned to England to undertake the pastorate of the Congregational church at Gosport in 1842.

In 1845, Morell gave up the ministry in favour of philosophy. In 1848 he made his name by his Historical and Critical View of the Speculative Philosophy of Europe in the Nineteenth Century. It brought him to the notice of Lord Lansdowne, who made him an inspector of schools. From 1848 till 1876 he was active in that career.

== Works ==
Morell's Historical and Critical View of the Speculative Philosophy of Europe in the Nineteenth Century was his major work. He showed a partiality for the "eclectic philosophy" of Victor Cousin, and pointed out the Scottish Enlightenment as a precursor. Rudolf Metz argued that Morell's thought itself was based on Scottish philosophy.

He published educational works, including:

- The Philosophy of Religion (1849)
- The Analysis of Sentences (1852)
- Elements of Psychology (1853)
- The Essentials of English Grammar and Analysis (1855)
- Handbook of Logic (1855)
- Grammar of the English Language (1857)
- The Philosophical Tendencies of the Age (1848), four lectures
- Fichte's Contributions to Moral Philosophy (1860)
- Philosophical Fragments (1878)
- An Introduction to Mental Philosophy on the Inductive Method (1862)
- Manual of History of Philosophy with numerous examination papers in mental science which have been set in the London University (1884).
