= Christian Hermann Weisse =

German Protestant religious philosopher (1801–1866)

- Born: 10 August 1801; Leipzig, Electorate of Saxony
- Died: 19 September 1866 (aged 65); Leipzig, Kingdom of Saxony

Education
- Education: University of Leipzig
- Academic advisor: I. H. Fichte (epistolary correspondent)

Philosophical work
- Era: 19th-century philosophy
- Region: Western philosophy
- School: German idealism
- Institutions: University of Leipzig (1828–37; 1841–66)
- Notable students: Hermann Lotze
- Main interests: Christian philosophy, philosophy of religion
- Notable ideas: Speculative theism Two-source hypothesis

Christian Hermann Weisse (Note: Weiße in Modern German) (/ˈvaɪsə/; German: [ˈvaɪsə]; 10 August 1801 – 19 September 1866) was a German Protestant religious philosopher and professor of philosophy at the University of Leipzig. He was the son of theologian Christian Ernst Weisse (1766–1832).

== Biography ==
Weisse was born in Leipzig, and studied at the university there, at first adhering to the Hegelian school of philosophy. In the course of time, his ideas changed, and became close to those of Schelling in his later years. He developed (along with I. H. Fichte with whom he regularly corresponded after 1829) a new speculative theism, and became an opponent of Hegel's idealism. In his addresses on the future of the Protestant Church (Reden über die Zukunft der evangelischen Kirche, 1849), he finds the essence of Christianity in Jesus' conceptions of the heavenly Father, the Son of Man and the kingdom of Heaven. In his work on philosophical dogmatics (Philosophische Dogmatik oder Philosophie des Christentums, 3 vols., 1855–1862) he seeks, by idealizing all the Christian dogmas, to reduce them to natural postulates of reason or conscience.

Weisse was the first theologian to propose the two-source hypothesis (1838), which is still held by a majority of biblical scholars today. In the two-source hypothesis, the Gospel of Mark was the first gospel to be written and was one of two sources to the Gospel of Matthew and the Gospel of Luke, the other source being the Q document, a lost collection of Jesus's sayings.

Weisse was a contributor to I. H. Fichte's academic journal Zeitschrift für Philosophie und spekulative Theologie.

He died in his native city of Leipzig, aged 65.

== Works ==
- System der Ästhetik (2 vols., 1830)
- Die Idee der Gottheit (1833)
- Die philosophische Geheimlehre von der Unsterblichkeit des menschlichen Individuums (1834)
- Grundzüge der Metaphysik (1835)
- Büchlein von der Auferstehung (1836)
- Die evangelische Geschichte, kritisch und philosophisch bearbeitet (2 vols., 1838)
- Reden über die Zukunft der evangelischen Kirche (1849)
- Philosophische Dogmatik oder Philosophie des Christentums (3 vols., 1855–1862)
- Die Evangelienfrage in ihrem gegenwärtigen Stadium (1856)
- Psychologie und Unsterblichkeitslehre (edited by R. Seydel, 1869)
