= Gluteal gait =

Type of gait with neurological problems

Gluteal gait is an abnormal gait caused by neurological problems. If the superior gluteal nerve or obturator nerves are injured, they fail to control the gluteus minimus and medius muscles properly, thus producing an inability to tilt the pelvis upward while swinging the leg forward to walk. To compensate for this loss, the leg swings out laterally so that the foot can move forward, producing a shuffling or waddling gait.

Injury to the superior gluteal nerve results in a characteristic motor loss, resulting in a disabling gluteus medius limp, to compensate for weakened abduction of the thigh by the gluteus medius and minimus, and/or a gluteal gait, a compensatory list of the body to the weakened gluteal side.

As a result of this compensation, the center of gravity is placed over the supporting lower limb. Medial rotation of the thigh is also severely impaired. When a person is asked to stand on one leg, the gluteus medius and minimus normally contract as soon as the contralateral foot leaves the floor, preventing tipping of the pelvis to the unsupported side. When a person with paralysis of the superior gluteal nerve is asked to stand on one leg, the pelvis descends on the unsupported side, indicating that the gluteus medius on the contralateral side is weak or non-functional. This observation is referred to clinically as a positive Trendelenburg's sign.

When the pelvis descends on the unsupported side, the lower limb becomes, in effect, too long and does not clear the ground when the foot is brought forward in the swing phase of walking. To compensate, the individual leans away from the unsupported side, raising the pelvis to allow adequate room for the foot to clear the ground as it swings forward.
