= Gustav Teichmüller =

German philosopher (1832–1888)

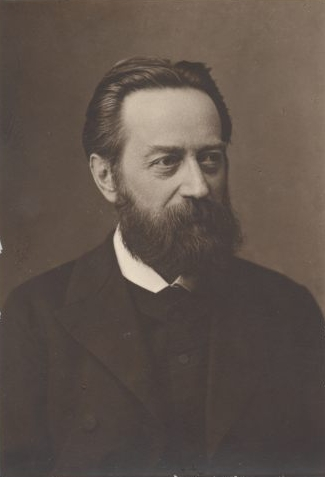
- Gustav Teichmüller
- Born: 19 November 1832; Braunschweig, Duchy of Brunswick, German Confederation
- Died: 22 May 1888 (aged 55); Tartu, Governorate of Livonia, Russian Empire

Education
- Education: University of Berlin
- Academic advisor: F. A. Trendelenburg

Philosophical work
- Era: 19th-century philosophy
- Region: Western philosophy
- School: German idealism, Russian personalism, neo-Leibnizianism
- Institutions: University of Basel; Imperial University of Dorpat
- Notable students: Rudolf Christoph Eucken
- Main interests: Epistemology, philosophy of religion
- Notable ideas: Continuation of Leibniz ideas

Gustav Teichmüller (German: [ˈɡʊstaf ˈtaɪçmʏlɐ]; November 19, 1832 – May 22, 1888) was a German philosopher. His works, particularly his notion of perspectivism, influenced Friedrich Nietzsche's philosophy.

== Biography ==
Teichmüller was born in Braunschweig in the Duchy of Brunswick. He was the son of August Teichmüller and Charlotte Georgine Elisabeth Teichmüller, née von Girsewaldt. His father was a lieutenant in the Prussian army. His mother also came from a soldier's family.

Teichmüller received a classical education at the local gymnasium, where he developed an interest in philosophy, especially aesthetic philosophy. Beginning in 1852, he studied philosophy in Berlin under Frederick Adolf Trendelenburg, a well-known specialist in ancient philosophy. He also spent a semester studying in Tübingen under Jakob Friedrich Reiff and Friedrich Theodor Vischer, gaining greater knowledge in the areas of natural science and classical philology.

He taught as a professor at the Basel University (since 1868) and the Imperial University of Dorpat (since 1871). He died in Dorpat, Russian Empire (now Tartu, Estonia).

== Career ==
After his father's death, Teichmüller was forced to find work due to financial difficulties. In August 1855, he was contracted as a tutor at the house of the Baron of Werther. Teichmüller, however, found the time to complete his doctorate in Halle, receiving his degree in 1856 with a dissertation entitled Aristotelische Einteilung der Verfassungsformen (“Aristotle’s Classification of Forms of Government”). When Werther was appointed German ambassador to Russia, Teichmüller followed his employer to Saint Petersburg.

After two years in Saint Petersburg, Teichmüller left the service of Werther and, in 1858, took a job as a teacher of Greek and German at the Gymnasium Annenkirche (the school of St. Anne's Lutheran Church). In the same year he married his first wife Anna Cramer, the daughter of an Estonian landowner. In 1860 he accepted a position as an adjunct lecturer (Privatdozent) in philosophy at the University of Göttingen, where he became part of an intellectual circle along with the philosopher Rudolf Hermann Lotze and Heinrich Ritter, the historian of philosophy. One of his students was Rudolf Christoph Eucken, who became an important protégé. Lotze also became a close family friend.

In 1861 his first daughter, composer Anna Teichmüller, was born and followed by his second daughter, Lina a year later. Shortly thereafter his wife died at the age of 20. In 1863, unable to continue his teaching career, Teichmüller began a year-and-a-half-long journey that took him to France, Spain, Greece, Italy, the Maghreb, the Levant, and Asia Minor. Returning to Göttingen, he resumed his teaching career, and in 1867 was accorded the title Professor Extraordinary. He also married his sister-in-law, Lina Cramer, with whom he went on to have eight children.

His student E.A. Bobrov described Teichmüller as “a man who suffered a great deal of evil and injustice in his life while never having done wrong or harm to anyone. Empathetic, he spent sizable amounts money to help indigent students. He was a skilled and influential speaker and teacher, a kind and patient mentor.” Bobrov and Wincenty Lutosławski were among his most successful students. Teichmüller remained professor of philosophy in Dorpat (now the Estonian city of Tartu) until his death in 1888.

He taught as a professor at the Basel University (since 1868) and the Imperial University of Dorpat (since 1871). He died in Dorpat, Russian Empire (now Tartu, Estonia).

== Philosophy ==
Teichmüller is considered a philosopher of the idealist school and a founder of Russian personalism.The philosopher also significantly influenced the Latvian philosophical thought. His ideas were shaped by his teachers Lotze and J. F. Herbart, who in turn were influenced by G. W. Leibniz. Some scholars describe Teichmüller's personalism as a version of neo-Leibnizianism. His doctrines have also been referred to as constituting a variant of Christian personalism that is in opposition to both positivism and evolutionism as well as traditional Platonism. The philosopher's religious views can be described as a form of panentheism. Teichmüller's philosophy has influenced Nietzsche and this link has been explored by scholars such as Hermann Nohl, who traced Teichmüller's Die wirkliche und die scheinbare Welt, 1882, as the source of the latter's perspectivism. Teichmüller also influenced the Russian thinkers A. A. Kozlov, I.F. Oze, and E. A. Bobrov.

His philosophical works can be divided into three. The first was concerned with the study of Aristotle, particularly those under the title Aristotelische Forschungen (Aristotelian Investigations), which were published in three volumes: Contributions to the Poetics of Aristotle (1867), Aristotle's Philosophy of Art (1869), and History of the Concept of Parousia (1873). One of his theories contained in these works was that the Nicomachean Ethics was completed before Aristotle finished Laws. As indicated by the title of the third volume, the second classification was marked by an interest in the history of concepts. His main works of this period involved the Studien zur Geschichte der Begriffe (Studies in the History of Concepts, 1874) and Neue Studien zur Geschichte der Begriffe (New Studies in the History of Concepts, 3 volumes, 1876–1879).

In his third philosophical work, Teichmüller explored the divide between the real and the apparent world. Teichmüller considered it imperative to separate consciousness, which includes feeling and action, from specific theoretical knowledge, and regarded such notions as space, time, and movement only as outwardly projected forms that are alien to reality itself and that condense inner processes into intuitions. His views are articulated in Die wirkliche und die scheinbare Welt (The Real and Apparent Worlds, 1882) and Die Religionsphilosophie (Philosophy of Religion, 1886).

== Bibliography ==
- Die aristotelische Eintheilung der Verwaltungsformen (St. Peterburg 1859)
- Studien zur Geschichte der Begriffe, 1874
- Darwinismus und Philosophie, 1877
