= Zeitschrift für Philosophie und philosophische Kritik =

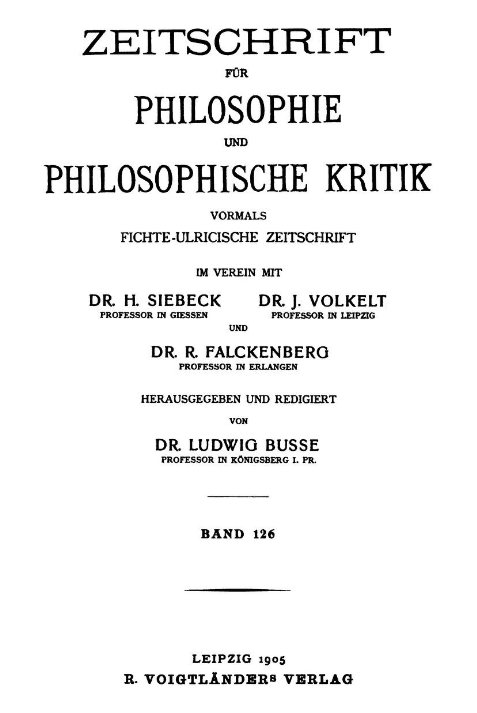
- Discipline: Philosophy
- Language: German
- Edited by: Immanuel Hermann Fichte (1837–47; 1853–79), Hermann Ulrici (1853–84), Johann Ulrich Wirth (1853–79)

Publication details
- Former name: Zeitschrift für Philosophie und spekulative Theologie
- History: 1837–47; 1853–1918
- Publisher: Pfeffer, Haacke (Germany)

Standard abbreviations
- ISO 4: Z. Philos. Philos. Krit.

Indexing
- OCLC no.: 183316332

Links
- List of volumes

The Zeitschrift für Philosophie und philosophische Kritik (English "Journal of Philosophy and Philosophical Criticism") was an academic journal. It was established in 1837 by editor-in-chief Immanuel Hermann Fichte as Zeitschrift für Philosophie und spekulative Theologie (English "Journal of Philosophy and Speculative Theology") and renamed in 1847. Notable early contributors included Christian Hermann Weisse.

Publication was suspended from 1848 to 1852, after which Hermann Ulrici and Johann Ulrich Wirth joined Fichte as editors. The journal served as an outlet for Fichte's views, especially about the philosophy of religion. It was published by Pfeffer in Halle (Saale) and Haacke in Leipzig. The last volume (165) was issued in 1918.

== Notable articles ==
- Georg Cantor's first statement of the Cantor–Bernstein–Schröder theorem, vol. 91, 1887, pp. 81–125.
- Gottlob Frege, "Über Sinn und Bedeutung" ("On Sense and Reference"), vol. 100, pp. 25–50.
