= Anna Teichmüller =

German composer (1861–1940)

Anna Teichmüller (11 May 1861 – 6 September 1940) was a German composer and teacher who set the works of many poets, especially Carl Hauptmann, to music. She composed most of her works at the Schreiberhau artist colony.

Teichmüller was born in Göttingen, the oldest child of Anna von Cramer and Gustav Teichmüller. The family lived in Tartu, Estonia, during her childhood, where Gustav was a university professor. After his wife's death in childbirth in 1862, Gustav married her sister Lina, and they had eight more children.

Teichmüller studied music in Jena and Berlin. She met Carl Hauptmann in Jena in 1893, and he persuaded her to move to the artist colony in Schreiberhau (then in Prussia; today known as Szklarska Poręba, Poland), where she lived until the end of her life. Hauptmann dedicated his book Aus meinem Tagebuch München (From My Munich Diary) to Teichmüller.

Although Teichmüller was known as Hauptmann's "Liederbraut" (bride of song), she composed music for the works of many writers, ranging from opus 1 through at least opus 43. The writers included Anton Alexander Graf von Auersperg (as Anastasius Grün), Ferdinand Avenarius, Hans Bethge, Bjørnstjerne Bjørnson, Marianne Blaauw, Grete Ziegler-Bock, Wolrad Eigenbrodt, Feodora, Princess of Schleswig-Holstein-Sonderburg-Augustenburg (as F. Hugin), Friedrich Ludwig Konrad Fiedler, Friedrich Hebbel, Gottfried Keller, Nikolaus Lenau, Conrad Ferdinand Meyer, Hans Reisiger, Rainer Maria Rilke, Leopold von Schroeder, Paul Verlaine, and Friedl Zacharias.

In addition to songs, Teichmüller composed chamber music and at least one opera. Her music is published by Classical Vocal Reprints and Hildegarde Publishing Company. Her works include:

== Chamber ==
- Forest Night, opus 22 (voice, cello and piano)
- Hymn to the Night, opus 23 (soprano, baritone, cello and piano)
- Suite, opus 41 (violin and piano)

== Mass ==
- Missa Poetica (text by Ilse von Stach)

== Songs ==
- See an alphabetical list of Teichmüller's songs
- Listen to Teichmüller's music on youtube
