= Immanuel Hermann Fichte =

German philosopher (1796–1879)

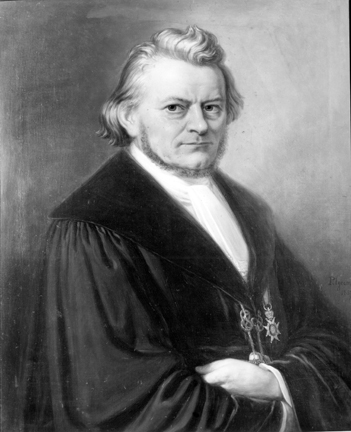
- Portrait of Fichte, 1859
- Born: 18 July 1796; Jena, Saxe-Weimar, Holy Roman Empire
- Died: 8 August 1879 (aged 83); Stuttgart, Württemberg, German Empire
- Father: J. G. Fichte

Education
- Education: University of Berlin (PhD, 1818)
- Thesis: De philosophiae novae Platonicae origine (On the origin of the new Platonic philosophy) (1818)

Philosophical work
- Era: 19th-century philosophy
- Region: Western philosophy
- School: German idealism Speculative theism
- Institutions: University of Bonn (1836–1842); University of Tübingen (1842–1863)
- Notable students: Christian Hermann Weisse (epistolary correspondent)
- Main interests: Metaphysics, ethics, philosophy of religion
- Notable ideas: Concrete theism

Immanuel Hermann Fichte (/ˈfɪxtə/; German: [ˈfɪçtə]; ennobled as Immanuel Hermann von Fichte in 1863; 18 July 1796 – 8 August 1879) was a German philosopher and son of Johann Gottlieb Fichte. In his philosophy, he was a theist and strongly opposed to the Hegelian school.

== Life ==
Fichte was born in Jena. He early devoted himself to philosophical studies, being attracted by the later views of his father, which he considered essentially theistic. He graduated from the University of Berlin in 1818. Soon after, he became a lecturer in philosophy there. He also attended the lectures of Georg Wilhelm Friedrich Hegel, but felt averse to what he deemed to be his pantheistic tendencies. As a result of semi-official suggestions, based on official disapproval of his supposedly liberal views, he decided, in 1822, to leave Berlin and accepted a professorship at the gymnasium in Saarbrücken. In 1826, he went in the same capacity to Düsseldorf. In 1836, he became an extraordinary professor of philosophy at the University of Bonn, and in 1840 full professor. Here, he quickly became a successful and much-admired lecturer. Dissatisfied with the reactionary tendencies of the Prussian Ministry of Education, he accepted a call to the chair of philosophy at the University of Tübingen in 1842 where he continued to give lectures on all philosophic subjects until his retirement in 1875, when he moved to Stuttgart. He died in Stuttgart on 8 August 1879.

In 1837, Fichte founded the Zeitschrift für Philosophie und speculative Theologie and edited it from then on. In 1847, the name was changed to Zeitschrift für Philosophie und philosophische Kritik. Publication was suspended 1848–1852, after which Hermann Ulrici and Johann Ulrich Wirth joined him as editors. This journal served as an organ of Fichte's views, especially on the subject of the philosophy of religion, where he was in alliance with C. H. Weisse (with whom he regularly corresponded after 1829); but, whereas Weisse thought that the Hegelian structure was sound in the main, and its imperfections might be mended, Fichte held it to be defective, and spoke of it as a masterpiece of erroneous consistency or consistent error. Fichte's general views on philosophy seem to have changed considerably as he gained in years, and his influence has been impaired by certain inconsistencies and an appearance of eclecticism, which is strengthened by his predominantly historical treatment of systems, his desire to include divergent systems within his own, and his conciliatory tone.

== Philosophical work ==
The great aim of his speculations was to find a philosophic basis for the personality of God, and for his theory on this subject, he proposed the term "concrete theism." His philosophy attempts to reconcile monism (Hegel) and individualism (Herbart) by means of monadism (Leibniz). He attacks Hegelianism for its pantheism, lowering of human personality, and imperfect recognition of the demands of the moral consciousness. God, he says, is to be regarded not as an absolute but as an Infinite Person, whose desire it is that he should realize himself in finite persons. These persons are objects of God's love, and he arranges the world for their good. The direct connecting link between God and man is the genius, a higher spiritual individuality existing fan by the side of his lower, earthly individuality. Fichte advocates an ethical theism, and his arguments might be turned to account by the apologist of Christianity. In the conception of finite personality, he recurs to something like the monadism of Leibniz. His insistence on moral experience connected with his insistence on personality.

One of the tests with which Fichte discriminates the value of previous systems is the adequacy with which they interpret moral experience. The same reason that made him depreciate Hegel made him praise Krause (panentheism) and Schleiermacher, and speak respectfully of English philosophy. It is characteristic of Fichte's most excessive receptiveness that in his latest published work, Der neuere Spiritualismus (1878), he supports his position by arguments of a somewhat occult or theosophical cast, not unlike that adopted by F. W. H. Myers.

The regeneration of Christianity, according to Fichte, would consist in its becoming the vital and organizing power in the state, instead of being occupied solely, as heretofore, with the salvation of individuals.

== Works ==
- De philosophiae novae Platonicae origine (1818).
- Sätze zur Vorschule der Theologie (1826). University of California.
- Beiträge zur Charakteristik der neueren Philosophie (1829). Harvard. 2nd edition, 1841. Gallica; NYPL.
- Johann Gottlieb Fichtes Leben und literarischer Briefwechsel (1830–31). 2 volumes.
  - Volume 1, 1830. 2nd edition, 1862. Oxford; Stanford; University of Göttingen.
  - Volume 2, 1831. NYPL. 2nd edition, 1862. Oxford; Stanford.
- Über Gegensatz, Wendepunkt und Ziel heutiger Philosophie (1832). University of Michigan.
- Grundzüge zum Systeme der Philosophie (1833–1846). 3 volumes.
  - Volume 1, 1833. Das Erkennen als Selbsterkennen. Gallica.
  - Volume 2, 1836. Die Ontologie. Gallica; University of Michigan.
  - Volume 3, 1846. Die speculative Theologie oder allgemeine Religionslehre. Gallica.
- Die Idee der Persönlichkeit und die individuelle Fortdauer (1834). 2nd edition, 1855.
- De principiorum contradictionis (1840). Gallica.
- System der Ethik (1850–53). 2 volumes.
  - Volume 1, 1850. Gallica; NYPL; Stanford; University of Michigan.
  - Volume 2, part 1, 1851. Gallica; NYPL; Oxford (1&2); University of Michigan (1&2).
  - Volume 2, part 2, 1853. Gallica; NYPL.
- Anthropologie, Die Lehre von der menschlichen Seele (1856). Gallica; Lane; University of Michigan. 2nd edition, 1860. Oxford; Oxford (Taylor). 3rd edition, 1876.
- Über den Unterschied zwischen ethischem und naturalistischem Theismus (1857).
- Zur Seelenfrage, Eine philosophische Confession (1859). University of California.
  - (in English) Contributions to Mental Philosophy (1860). Harvard.
- Psychologie. Die Lehre vom bewussten Geiste des Menschen (1864–73). 2 volumes. Oxford; University of Michigan.
  - Volume 1, 1864.
  - Volume 2, 1873. Harvard.
- Die Seelenfortdauer und die Weltstellung des Menschen (1867).
- Vermischte Schriften zur Philosophie, Theologie und Ethik (1869). 2 volumes. Oxford.
  - Volume 1. Gallica.
  - Volume 2. Gallica.
- Die theistische Weltansicht und ihre Berechtigung (1873). Oxford; University of Michigan.
- Fragen und Bedenken über die nächste Fortbildung deutscher Speculation (1876). Gallica; Oxford; University of Michigan.
- Der neuere Spiritualismus, sein Wert und seine Täuschungen (1878). Oxford.

He also edited the complete works and literary correspondence of his father. Some of his works were translated by J. D. Morell under the title of Contributions to Mental Philosophy (1860).
