= Teningen =

- Municipality
- Coat of arms

- Location of Teningen within Emmendingen district
- Interactive map of Teningen
- Location within Germany Location within Baden-Württemberg
- Coordinates: 48°7′37″N 7°48′37″E
- Country: Germany
- State: Baden-Württemberg
- Admin. region: Freiburg
- District: Emmendingen
- Subdivisions: 4

Government
  - Mayor (2017–25): Heinz-Rudolf Hagenacker (CDU)

Area
  - Total: 40.26 km^{2} (15.54 sq mi)
- Elevation: 188 m (617 ft)

Population (2025-12-31)
  - Total: 12,072
  - Density: 299.9/km^{2} (776.6/sq mi)
- Time zone: UTC+01:00 (CET)
  - Summer (DST): UTC+02:00 (CEST)
- Postal codes: 79331
- Dialling codes: 07641 und 07663
- Vehicle registration: EM
- Website: www.teningen.de

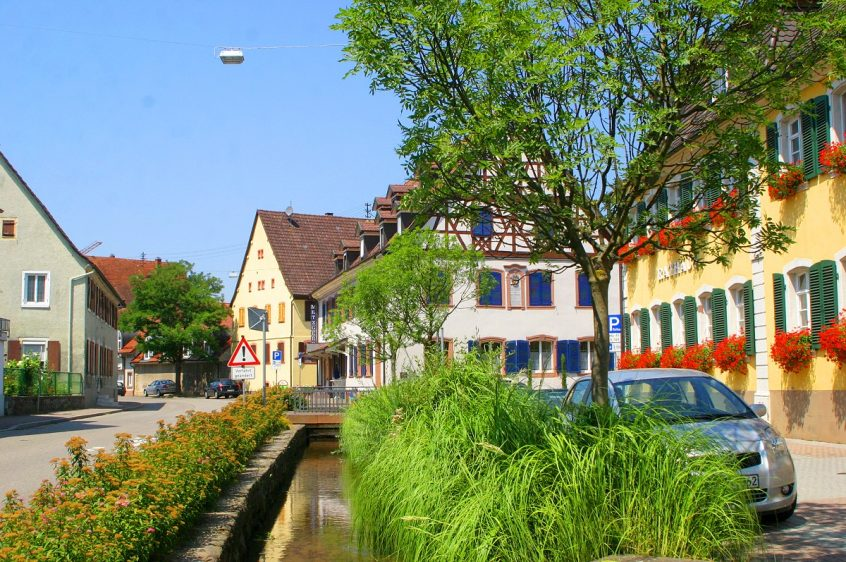

Teningen (German pronunciation: [ˈteːnɪŋən]) is a municipality in the district of Emmendingen, in the state Baden-Württemberg in Germany. It is situated on the river Elz, 15 km north of Freiburg.

== Geography ==
=== Location ===
Teningen is set on the edge of the Black Forest mountain range.

=== Geology ===
The geological subsoil consists of sandstone and limestone and is covered by loess layers of different thickness. The Elz river created alluvial gravel and sand sediments that had been used as pastures but were adapted for agriculture in many cases.

=== Municipal subdivisions ===
The municipality Teningen comprises four districts: The main town Teningen and the formerly independent towns Heimbach, Köndringen and Nimburg.

=== Climate ===
The climate in this area is close to a Mediterranean microclimate, and there is adequate rainfall year-round. However, more year-round rain occurs than in the Rhine plateau because of the closeness to the Black Forest. The Köppen Climate Classification subtype for this climate is "Cfb" (Marine West Coast Climate/Oceanic climate). However, it is close to being humid subtropical (Cfa) due to the mean temperatures in July and August just under 22 °C. The city is close to the Kaiserstuhl, a range of hills of volcanic origin located a few miles away which is considered to be one of the warmest places of Germany and therefore considered as a viticultural area.

Climate data for Teningen - Emmendingen (Mundingen) 2015-2020
Month	Jan	Feb	Mar	Apr	May	Jun	Jul	Aug	Sep	Oct	Nov	Dec	Year
Record high °C (°F)	15.9 (60.6)	20.3 (68.5)	24.0 (75.2)	29.5 (85.1)	33.3 (91.9)	37.1 (98.8)	37.7 (99.9)	38.5 (101.3)	32.3 (90.1)	28.1 (82.6)	23.8 (74.8)	18.0 (64.4)	38.5 (101.3)
Mean daily maximum °C (°F)	6.2 (43.2)	8.1 (46.6)	12.8 (55.0)	17.0 (62.6)	20.7 (69.3)	25.4 (77.7)	27.5 (81.5)	26.4 (79.5)	22.6 (72.7)	16.3 (61.3)	10.7 (51.3)	7.9 (46.2)	16.8 (62.2)
Daily mean °C (°F)	2.7 (36.9)	3.5 (38.3)	6.9 (44.4)	10.5 (50.9)	14.7 (58.5)	19.2 (66.6)	21.1 (70.0)	20.0 (68.0)	15.5 (59.9)	10.7 (51.3)	6.4 (43.5)	4.1 (39.4)	11.3 (52.3)
Mean daily minimum °C (°F)	−1.1 (30.0)	−0.4 (31.3)	1.3 (34.3)	3.7 (38.7)	8.4 (47.1)	12.9 (55.2)	13.8 (56.8)	13.0 (55.4)	9.2 (48.6)	5.6 (42.1)	2.1 (35.8)	0.3 (32.5)	5.8 (42.4)
Record low °C (°F)	−15.5 (4.1)	−12.1 (10.2)	−5.2 (22.6)	−3.3 (26.1)	1.7 (35.1)	5.9 (42.6)	5.7 (42.3)	5.7 (42.3)	0.6 (33.1)	−2.5 (27.5)	−6.9 (19.6)	−6.7 (19.9)	−6.8 (19.8)
Average precipitation mm (inches)	63 (2.5)	44 (1.7)	43 (1.7)	69 (2.7)	119 (4.7)	93 (3.7)	47 (1.9)	73 (2.9)	52 (2.0)	47 (1.9)	55 (2.2)	44 (1.7)	749 (29.5)
Average precipitation days (≥ 0.2 mm)	14.9	13.4	16.0	13.0	15.1	12.3	15.1	14.8	11.7	15.7	16.7	15.3	173.9
Average rainy days (≥ 0.2 mm)	13	10	15	14	17	16	12	13	11	14	14	14	163
Average snowy days (≥ 0.2 cm)	3.4	0.8	0.4	0.2	0	0	0	0	0	0	0.4	3.0	8.2
Mean monthly sunshine hours	71.7	96.3	136.3	167.5	199.5	249.6	238.9	219.9	165.9	117.3	70.6	60.3	1,793.8
Source 1: Weather-Online
Source 2: Weather-Online

== Mayors ==
- Friedrich Engler (SPD): 1945-1946
- Wilhelm Höfflin (parteilos): 1946–1956
- Josef Schmidt (SPD): 1957–1972
- Willy Bolz (independent): 1972–1980
- Hermann Jäger (SPD): 1980–2009
- Heinz-Rudolf Hagenacker (CDU): 2009–2025
- Berthold Schuler (independent): since 2025

== Twin towns ==
- La Ravoire, France, since 1984
- Zeithain, Germany, since 1990

== Sons and daughters of the place ==
- 1603: Johann Conrad Dannhauer, Protestant theologian, professor of eloquence / rhetoric, hermeneutician and poet; † 1666 in Strasbourg
- 1807: Wilhelm Theophor Dittenberger, Protestant theologian; † 1871 in Weimar
- 1899: Otto Krayer, pharmacologist, opponent against national socialist racism, since 1957 honorary citizen of Köndringen; † 1982 in Tucson / Arizona
