= Wilhelm Trendelenburg =

German physiologist

Wilhelm Theodor Trendelenburg
- Born: June 16, 1877; Rostock Germany
- Died: March 16, 1946 (aged 68); Tübingen Germany
- Awards: Lieben Prize (1915)

Ernst Wilhelm Theodor Trendelenburg (16 July 1877 – 16 March 1946) was a German physiologist known for his work in physiological optics.

He studied physiology at the University of Freiburg, receiving his doctorate from the University of Leipzig in 1900. He worked as an assistant to Johannes von Kries at Freiburg and to Ewald Hering at Leipzig. In 1904 he obtained his habilitation for physiology at Freiburg, and in 1911 became a full professor at the University of Innsbruck. Afterwards, he held professorships at the universities of Giessen (from 1916), Tübingen (from 1917) and Berlin (from 1927).

In 1931 he became a member of the Prussian Academy of Sciences.

He was the son of surgeon Friedrich Trendelenburg and the grandson of renowned philosopher Friedrich Adolf Trendelenburg. He was the brother of pharmacologist Paul Trendelenburg, the pharmacologist Paul Trendelenburg and of the politician Ernst Trendelenburg.

He was an accomplished musician, being adept at playing violin and cello. It is believed that he was the first scientist to conduct studies on the role of bow pressure, contact point and bow speed in the determination of tone color. During his time spent at the University of Freiburg he conducted studies involving animal psychology that included intelligence testing with monkeys. He is also credited as the inventor of the red adaptation goggles.

== Selected works ==
- Der Gesichtssinn; Grundzüge der physiologischen Optik (with Erich Schütz), 1924 – The sense of sight; Principles of physiological optics.
- Die natürlichen grundlagen der kunst des streichinstrumentspiels, 1925 – The natural foundations concerning the art of stringed instrument exercises.
- Anleitung zu den physiologischen übungen für studierende der medizin, 1938 – Instructions on physiological exercises for medical students.
- Zur Kenntnis der Kurvengestalt der Vokalperiode in ihrer Beziehung zu den Vorgängen im Kehlkopf, 1940 – A treatise on the processes in the larynx associated with vowel sounds.
- Zur Kenntnis des abnormen Farbensinns und seiner Vererbung, 1941 – Information on abnormal color sense and heredity.
- Über den Licht- und Farbensinn, 1943 – On light and color sense.

He was also co-editor of the periodical Zeitschrift für die gesamte experimentelle Medizin.
