= Meyrick Booth =

Meyrick Booth B.Sc., Ph.D., (1883–1968) was a British educational psychologist.

== Works ==
- Charles Dickens und seine Werke in Pädagogischer Beleuchtung, Schulthess & Co., 1909.
- Rudolf Eucken: his Philosophy and Influence, T. Fisher Unwin, 1913.
- Social Reconstruction in Germany, G. Allen & Unwin Limited, 1919.
- Women and Society, Allen and Unwin, 1929.
- Youth and Sex, G. Allen & Unwin ltd., 1932 [Am. ed., New York, W. Morrow & Company, 1933].
  Notably mentions an early attempt to form a men's rights league.

=== Articles ===
- "The Decay of Fixed Ideals," The Dublin Review, Vol. CXLVIII, January/April, 1911.
- "Religious Belief as Affecting the Growth of Population," The Hibbert Journal, Vol. XIII, October 1914/July 1915.
- "A Voice of Warning." In Anarchy or Order, Duty & Discipline Movement, 1915.
- "Idealistic Revolt in Germany," The Living Age, March 8, 1924.
- "The Sex Ratio," The Living Age, September 1928.

=== Miscellany ===
- F. W. Foerster, Marriage and the Sex-problem, Translated by Meyrick Booth, Stokes, 1912 [1st Pub. Wells Gardner, Darton & Co., ltd., c. 1911].
- Rudolf Christoph Eucken, Main Currents of Modern Thought: A Study of the Spiritual and Intellectual Movements of the Present Day, Translated by Meyrick Booth, T. Fisher Unwin, 1912.
- Rudolf Christoph Eucken, Collected Essays of Rudolf Eucken, Edited and Translated by Meyrick Booth, T. Fisher Unwin, 1914.
- Rev. Paul Simon, The Human Element in the Church of Christ, Translated by Meyrick Booth, Newman Press, 1954.
- Frederick Von Gagern, The Problem of Onanism, Translated by Meyrick Booth, Mercier Press, 1956.
- Bernhard Häring, The Sociology of the Family, Translated by Meyrick Booth, Mercier Press, 1959.

== See also ==
- Birth control
- Rudolf Christoph Eucken
