= George Sylvester Morris =

American educator and philosophical writer

- Born: November 15, 1840; Norwich, Vermont, U.S.
- Died: March 23, 1889 (aged 48); Ann Arbor, Michigan, U.S.

Education
- Education: Dartmouth College; Union Theological Seminary
- Academic advisors: F. A. Trendelenburg; Hermann Ulrici

Philosophical work
- Era: 19th-century philosophy
- Region: Western philosophy
- School: Aristotelian idealism
- Institutions: Johns Hopkins University
- Doctoral students: John Dewey
- Main interests: Metaphysics, logic, ethics, aesthetics, history of philosophy
- Notable ideas: Final cause as a principle of cognition and nature

George Sylvester Morris (November 15, 1840 – March 23, 1889) was an American educator and philosopher.

== Biography ==
Morris was born in Norwich, Vermont. He was the son of a well known abolitionist and temperance man. In 1861, he graduated from Dartmouth College, served in the Union army for two years during the American Civil War, and taught at Dartmouth in 1863–1864.

He studied philosophy and theology at Union Theological Seminary in the City of New York and then in Germany (under Hermann Ulrici and Friedrich Adolf Trendelenburg) for several years, after which, in 1870, the University of Michigan appointed him professor of modern languages and literature. He arranged for John Dewey's first college level teaching position at the University of Michigan. He was also offered the chair of philosophy at Bowdoin College, which he declined in view of Bowdoin's wish for some assurance of his soundness in Christian doctrine. In January 1878 he gave twenty lectures at Johns Hopkins University (Hopkins Hall Lectures, which were open to the public) on the history of philosophy. He continued lecturing regularly at Hopkins through 1884, on such topics as British philosophy, German aesthetics, and ethics. In 1881, he was appointed to the chair of ethics, history of philosophy, and logic at Michigan. In 1883 he became chair of the Michigan department, a position he held until his death. At Johns Hopkins Morris was one of John Dewey's main teachers. He also gave a course of twelve public lectures on British Thought and Thinkers (which he would later publish in book form).

== Publications ==
Morris published a translation of Friedrich Ueberweg's History of Philosophy (two volumes, 1872–74) and an edition of Philosophical Classics by Gregg, and he wrote:

- British Thought and Thinkers (1880)
- Kant's Critique of Pure Reason: A Critical Exposition (1882)
- Philosophy and Christianity (1883)
- Hegel's Philosophy of the State and of History (1887)
