= Hermann Ulrici =

German philosopher (1806–1884)

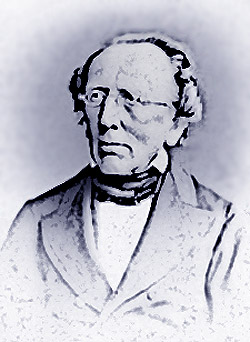
- Born: 23 March 1806; Pförten, Neumark, Margraviate of Brandenburg
- Died: 11 January 1884 (aged 77); Halle (Saale), Province of Saxony, German Empire

Education
- Education: University of Berlin

Philosophical work
- Era: 19th-century philosophy
- Region: Western philosophy
- School: German idealism Speculative theism Spiritism
- Institutions: University of Halle
- Notable students: George Morris
- Main interests: Metaphysics, philosophical logic
- Notable ideas: Scientific evidence for God's existence

Hermann Ulrici (German: [ˈʊlʀɪtsi]; 23 March 1806 – 11 January 1884) was a German philosopher. He was co-editor (with I. H. Fichte) of the philosophical journal Zeitschrift für Philosophie und philosophische Kritik. He also wrote under the pseudonym of Ulrich Reimann.

== Life ==
Ulrici was born at Pförten, in the Niederlausitz region of the Margraviate of Brandenburg. He was educated at the Friedrichswerdersches Gymnasium in Berlin. He initially studied law, but gave up his profession on the death of his father, and devoted four years to the study of literature, philosophy and science. In 1834, he was appointed professor of philosophy at the University of Halle, where he remained till his death.

== Thought ==
His philosophical standpoint may be characterized as a reaction from the pantheistic tendency of Hegel's idealistic rationalism towards a more pronouncedly theistic position. The Hegelian identity of being and thought is also abandoned and the truth of realism acknowledged, an attempt being made to exhibit idealism and realism as respectively incomplete but mutually complementary systems.

Ulrici's later works, while expressing the same views, are largely occupied in proving the existence of God and the soul on the basis of scientific conceptions, and in opposition to the materialistic current of thought then popular in Germany. His first works were in the sphere of literary criticism; of his treatise On Shakespeare's Dramatic Art (1839; editions, 1847, 1868, 1874), the 3rd ed. was translated into English by LD Schmitz in 1876. In 1841 he published Ueber Princip und Methode der Hegelschen Philosophie, a severe criticism of the Hegelian system. This was continued in the Grundprincip der Philosophie (1845–1846), which also gives his speculative position. Complementary to this is his System der Logik (1852).

His later works on the relation of philosophy to science and to the thought of his time were more popular in character. These are Glauben und Wissen (1858), Gott und die Natur (1862; 3rd ed., 1875), Gott und der Mensch (2 vols, 1866–1873; 2nd ed., 1874). From 1847 onward Ulrici edited, jointly with I. H. Fichte, the Zeitschrift für Philosophie und philosophische Kritik.

== Works ==
- De indole et ingenio veteris Historiae (1831)
- Charakteristik der antiken Historiographie (1833)
- (Ulrich Reimann) Novellen 2 volumes (1833)
- Geschichte der Hellenischen Dichtkunst 2 volumes (1835)
  - Volume 1, 1835.
  - Volume 2, 1835.
- Ueber Shakspeare's dramatische Kunst (1839) 2nd ed., 1847 3rd ed., 1869
  - (in English) Shakespeare's Dramatic Art (Tr. Morrison) (1846)
  - (in English) Shakespeare's Dramatic Art (Tr. Schmitz) 2 volumes (1876)
    - Volume 1, 1876.
    - Volume 2, 1876.
- Ueber Princip und Methode der Hegelschen Philosophie (1841)
- Das Grundprincip der Philosophie, kritisch und speculativ entwickelt 2 volumes (1845–1846)
  - Volume 1, 1845.
  - Volume 2, 1846.
- (Co-editor) Zeitschrift für Philosophie und philosophische Kritik (1847–1884)
- System der Logik (1852)
- Glauben und Wissen, Speculation und exacte Wissenschaft (1858)
- Compendium der Logik (1860) 2nd ed., 1872
- Gott und die Natur (1862) 2nd ed., 1866 3rd ed., 1875
- Gott und der Mensch, 2 volumes, 1st edition 1866, 2nd ed. 1874
  - Volume 1, Leib und Seele: Grundzüge einer Psychologie des Menschen, 2nd edition, 1874, Volume 1-1 (1st edition 1866), Volume 1-2
  - Volume 2, 1873. Grundzüge der praktischen Philosophie: das Naturrecht.
- "Zur logischen Frage" in Zeitschrift für Philosophie und philosophische Kritik Vol. 55 (1869) and Vol. 56 (1870)
- Der Philosoph Strauss (1873)
  - (in English) Strauss as a philosophical thinker (1874)
- Ueber den spiritismus als wissenschaftliche Frage (1879)
