= Wilhelm Theophor Dittenberger =

German Protestant theologian

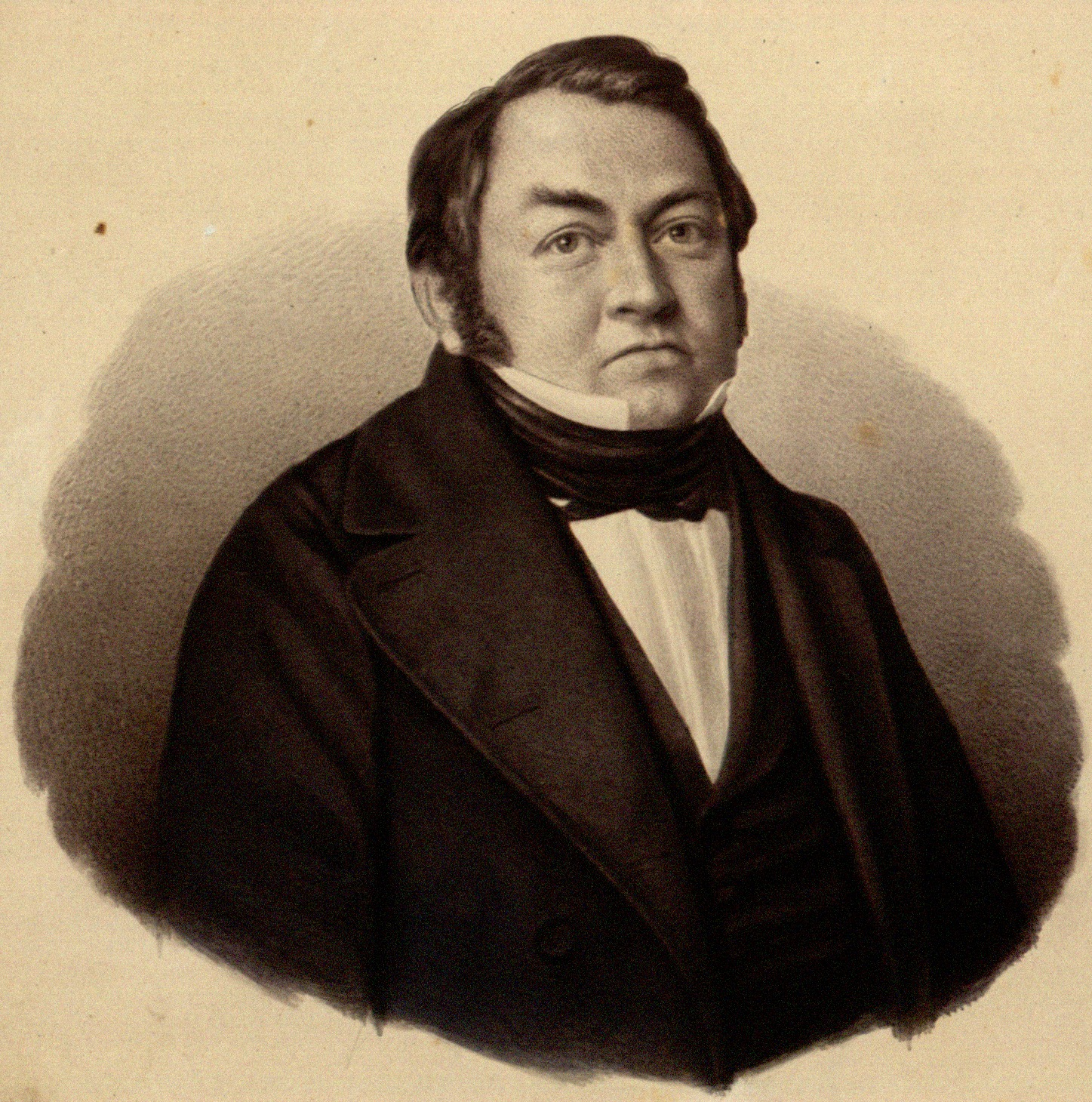
Theophor Wilhelm Dittenberger

Wilhelm Theophor Dittenberger (30 April 1807, in Teningen – 11 May 1871, in Weimar) was a German Protestant theologian. He was the father of classical philologist Wilhelm Dittenberger (1840–1906) and son-in-law to theologian Karl Daub (1765–1836). The elder Dittenberger was considered to be one of the leaders of liberal Protestantism in Baden.

He studied theology at the Universities of Halle and Heidelberg, then embarked on a study trip that took him to almost all the universities in Germany and Denmark. In 1832 he obtained his habilitation at Heidelberg, and subsequently worked as a lecturer, university preacher, and as a pastor at the Heilig-Geist-Kirche in Heidelberg. From 1847 to 1852, he was a professor of theology at the University of Heidelberg, afterwards serving as Kirchenrath, Oberhofprediger and Oberpfarrer in Weimar.

Along with Karl Zittel (1802–1871), he published the Zeitschrift für deutsch-protestantische Kirchenverfassung (Journal of the German Protestant Church constitution). He played an important role in the Baden General Synod (1843) as well as in the Gustav-Adolfs-Vereins.

== Selected works ==
- Ueber Predigerseminarien: Mit Berücksichtigung der zu Herborn, Loccum und Wittenberg vorhandenen und in Bezug auf die Errichtung eines solchen im Großherzogthum Baden, Heidelberg 1835 – On preacher seminaries, etc.
- Geographie für Lyceen, Gymnasien, Mittelschulen und zum Privatunterrichte, Heidelberg 1837 – Geography for lyceums, high schools, middle schools and private lessons.
- Die Universität Heidelberg im Jahre 1804: Ein Beitrag zu ihrer Geschichte, Heidelberg 1844 – The University of Heidelberg in 1804: A review of its history.

With Philip Marheineke, he edited Daub's Vorlesungen über die philosophische Anthropologie (1838); (Lectures on philosophical anthropology).
