= Brodie–Trendelenburg percussion test =

- Purpose: determine valvular incompetence in superficial veins

The Brodie–Trendelenburg percussion test is a medical test to determine valvular incompetence in superficial veins. A finger is placed over the lower (distal) part of the vein being examined. The upper (proximal) part of the vein is then tapped (percussed). If the impulse is felt by the finger placed at the lower end, it indicates incompetence of valves in that vein.

The test is used as part of the examination of varicose veins. It is named after Sir Benjamin Collins Brodie and Friedrich Trendelenburg.

== See also ==
- Trendelenburg test
