= Otto Krayer =

German-American physician and pharmacologist

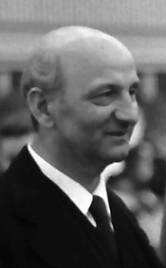
Otto Krayer (1957)

Otto Hermann Krayer (22 October 1899 in Köndringen, Baden – 18 March 1982 in Tucson, Arizona) was a German-American physician, pharmacologist and university professor.

He was the only German scientist who refused on moral grounds to succeed a colleague who had been dismissed from his professorial chair by the National-Socialist government for antisemitic reasons. Krayer voiced his opinion publicly and aggressively. The medical historian Udo Schagen entitled his historical analysis of Krayer: "Widerständiges Verhalten im Meer von Begeisterung, Opportunismus und Antisemitismus" or 'Resistant Behaviour in a Sea of Enthusiasm, Opportunism and Antisemitism'.

== Life ==
Otto Krayer's parents were the council scribe Hermann Krayer and his wife Frieda (née Wolfsperger), who made a living from the 'Rebstock' restaurant in Köndringen, Baden. Otto Krayer's education in Emmendingen and at the Rotteck-Gymnasium in Freiburg was disrupted by the First World War: he was wounded on the Western Front. From 1919 to 1924, Krayer studied medicine at the University of Freiburg, the Ludwig-Maximilians-Universität München, and the Friedrich Wilhelm University of Berlin. In 1925, he interned for Paul Trendelenburg at the University of Freiburg's Institute of Pharmacology. In 1926, he graduated as a medical doctor with his thesis: 'The Pharmacological Characteristics of Pure Apocodeine' and finally he became a scientific assistant at the University of Freiburg.

In 1927, both Krayer and Trendelenburg transferred to the Pharmacological Institute at the University of Berlin, where Krayer qualified as a university lecturer in 1929. From 1930 to 1932, Krayer was managing director of the Institute of Pharmacology and Toxicology at the University of Berlin, during Trendelenburg's severe illness and continuing after his subsequent death in 1931. In 1933 the Jewish pharmacologist Philipp Ellinger (1887-1952) was removed from his post as a professor at the Düsseldorf Medical Academy (now part of the University of Düsseldorf) and Krayer was appointed as his successor. Krayer initially rejected his post verbally, as the new director of the Berlin Institute of Pharmacology and Toxicology, Wolfgang Heubner, recounts in his diary entry from 14 June 1933: '<Krayer came> to me in person at around midday to tell me that he had seen Pertmanent Secretary Achelis to voice his personal reservations about replacing a man who, in his opinion, had been removed from office for no good reason. Upon this, Achelis dismissed him, telling him that he, Achelis, would look for someone else. Magnificent!'

On 15 June 1933, Krayer pointed out his position to the Prussian Ministry of Science, Art and Culture in no uncertain terms. His letter, along with the Ministry's response, has been reported by Udo Schagen and also on the website of the Institute of Experimental and Clinical Pharmacology at the University of Freiburg. Krayer writes, amongst other things:

"Apart from unimportant factual considerations, the main reason for my reluctance is that I feel the exclusion of Jewish scientists to be an injustice, the necessity of which I cannot understand, since it has been justified by reasons that lie outside the domain of science. This feeling of injustice is an ethical phenomenon. It is innate to the structure of my personality and not something imposed from the outside. Under these circumstances, the acceptance of such a position as the one in Düsseldorf, would mean to me mental stress which would make it difficult to me to take up my work as a teacher with the joy and dedication without I cannot teach properly. […] I would rather refuse to achieve a position which corresponds to my inclinations and abilities than to decide against my conviction; or, by remaining silent at the wrong time, to encourage an opinion about myself which does not agree with the facts."

The State Secretary in the Prussian Ministry of Culture, Wilhelm Stuckart, imposed a ban on German universities on Krayer, which included the use of public libraries. After a stay as a Rockefeller Fellow at the Department of Pharmacology of the University College London in 1934, he led the Department of Pharmacology of the American University of Beirut ( Lebanon ) from 1934 to 1937 and was then Associate Professor at the Department of Pharmacology at Harvard University in Cambridge ( Massachusetts ) until 1939. Wolfgang Heubner reported about a meeting in his diary on 4 July 1935: "On the way I spoke with Krayer who justified his refusal to return to Germany with the impossibility of taking the Hitler oath." In 1938, Krayer was offered a chair of Pharmacology of Peking University. From 1939 to 1966 he led the Department of Pharmacology at Harvard University.

Still living in the United States, Krayer rejected the Nazi ideology a second time but this time regardless of racism. At the annual meeting of the German Chemical Society in 1937, the president, Alfred Stock, described the awarding of the Nobel Peace Prize to Carl von Ossietzky as a slap in the face of every German. According to him, it was understandable that both the government and the people were angry and didn't want to have anything to do with the Nobel Prize. "The crime of the Norwegian Parliamentary Committee is deeply regretted by the society of science." Krayer responded by writing a letter to the office of the company. Due to Stock's remark he felt obliged to demand to be crossed off the list of members. To Stock personally he wrote that in his opinion it was not right to claim that every German scientist felt offended by the most recent Nobel Prize award. He did not know Ossietzky personally. However, everybody who had impartially observed his life, could not, even as a political opponent, deny the extraordinary personality of this man. Although Ossietzky must have foreseen that his opponents would not do him justice, turning his words into action was of tremendous importance in his life. What could better promote peace between the nations than the actions of men like him, who were guided by a feeling of pure and deep responsibility for a higher humane order than represented by that nation, in which Stock and he ("we") were born into.

On behalf of the Unitarian Universalist Service Committee, Krayer lead a 'Medical Mission to Germany' after the war, which aimed at helping to reconstruct fields of training and research in medicine. The 'Medical Mission' recommended that German professors, young scientists, medicine students and architects visited the United States in order to get to know examples for the reconstruction of war-damaged laboratories as well as to receive material support and to create a German Research Council. Krayer wrote in his report: "There is no sign of a 'lost' generation, who grew up under the Hitler regime and is said to be hopelessly poisoned by the Nazi propaganda. In contrast, many of these young people from the first semesters at university have already become suspicious concerning the doctrine preached by the Nazis, long before its deceptive and fatal nature became clear to the older generation. If they find openness, encouragement and smart leadership at home and abroad, these young men and women will be the best chance for a 'better' Germany."

Krayer spent the summer months of the years 1972 to 1980 as a guest professor at the Institute of Pharmacology at the Ludwig-Maximilians-Universität München, which was run by Melchior Reiter (1919-2007) who had visited Krayer several times in Boston for research purposes. During this period Krayer worked on a history of the 'Boehmsche Pharmakologenschule', of which he was a member. His teacher Paul Trendelenburg had been Walther Straub's student, who in turn had been Rudolf Boehm's student. Krayer died before the completion of the manuscript but Reiter published it, adding a few supplements.

== Research ==
Krayer's main area of research was the pharmacology of the human heart and blood circulation. For instance, he pharmacologically characterised the ingredients of the Veratrum plant, such as veratramine. While working in Berlin, he cooperated with Wilhelm Feldberg to prove that acetylcholine is a neurotransmitter for the parasympathetic nervous system in mammals. This research was published in 1933 and that same year both researchers left Germany: Feldberg, who was Jewish, on 7 July, Otto Krayer on 31 December.

== Honours ==
Out of all his numerous honours, Krayer's favourite was the honorary citizenship of his home town of Köndringen. He was elected as a member of the American Academy of Arts and Sciences in 1949. In 1964, the German Pharmacological Society bestowed their highest honour on him by giving him the Schmiedeberg badge. In 1962, he became a member of the Academy of Sciences Leopoldina, Germany's national scientific academy. In 1965, the Düsseldorf Academy of Medicine offered him an honorary membership. At first, Krayer gladly accepted the honour, but later on laboriously wrote a rejection letter (numerous handwritten drafts have been found): "I have come to the decision that the right thing to do is to reject the honorary membership of the Düsseldorf Academy of Medicine. … By now I have realised that the ethical position I adopted in 1933 does not allow for any kind of external appreciation. … I regret that it took me so long to clearly express my conviction." In 2001, the University of Freiburg honoured Krayer by naming the building for the Institute of Pharmacology and Toxicology and the Institute of Pharmaceutical and Medicinal Chemistry after him.

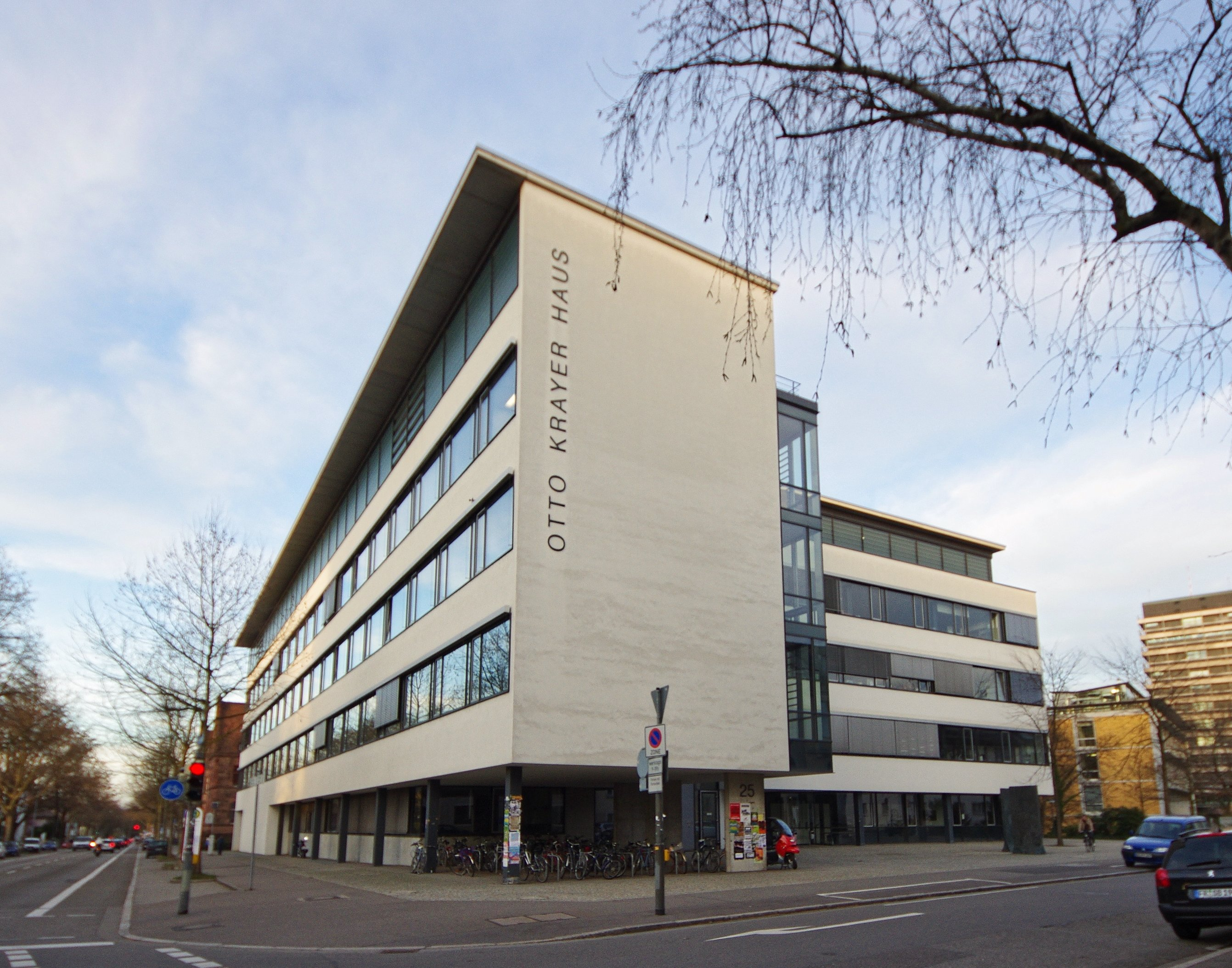
Otto Krayer House in Freiburg

Udo Schagen concludes: "As far as I know there is no second case where a non-Jewish, not politically active researcher adopted a similarly clear and offensively expressed position with no regard for his own career and for potential political persecution. This is even more striking considering that for Krayer it was the first offer of an academic chair, which could hardly be rejected by researchers according to academic career conventions." On 19 July 1995, Krayer's actions from the year 1933 first became public when being mentioned in an article in the Frankfurter Allgemeine Zeitung, an important German newspaper. Ullrich Trendelenburg, who was the son of Paul Trendelenburg and Krayer's student and friend, closed this article with the following words: "Considering the horrors of the Third Reich, his deeds should be a comfort to us. When looking for a role model for the young generation, it is found in Otto Krayer. May the memory of this one righteous person never fade."

== Literature ==
- Ullrich Trendelenburg: Otto Krayer (22.10.1899 bis 18.3.1982) und das "Gesetz zur Wiederherstellung des Berufsbeamtentums" (April 1933). In: DGPT Mitteilungen. 16, 1995, p. 33–34.
- Klaus Starke: Die Geschichte des Pharmakologischen Instituts der Universität Freiburg. 2nd edition. Springer, Berlin, 2004 (online, PDF; 1,52 MB)
- Udo Schagen: Widerständiges Verhalten im Meer von Begeisterung, Opportunismus und Antisemitismus. Der Pharmakologe Otto Krayer (1899–1982). In: Jahrbuch für Universitätsgeschichte. 10, 2007, p. 223–247.
- Sabine Schleiermacher, Udo Schlagen (eds.): Die Charité im Dritten Reich – Zur Dienstbarkeit medizinischer Wissenschaft im Nationalsozialismus. Paderborn 2008, ISBN 3-506-76476-4.
- Avram Goldstein. Otto Krayer, 1899-1982. A biographical memoir by Avram Goldstein. Washington, D.C., The National Academy Press, 1987.
