= Trendelenburg's sign =

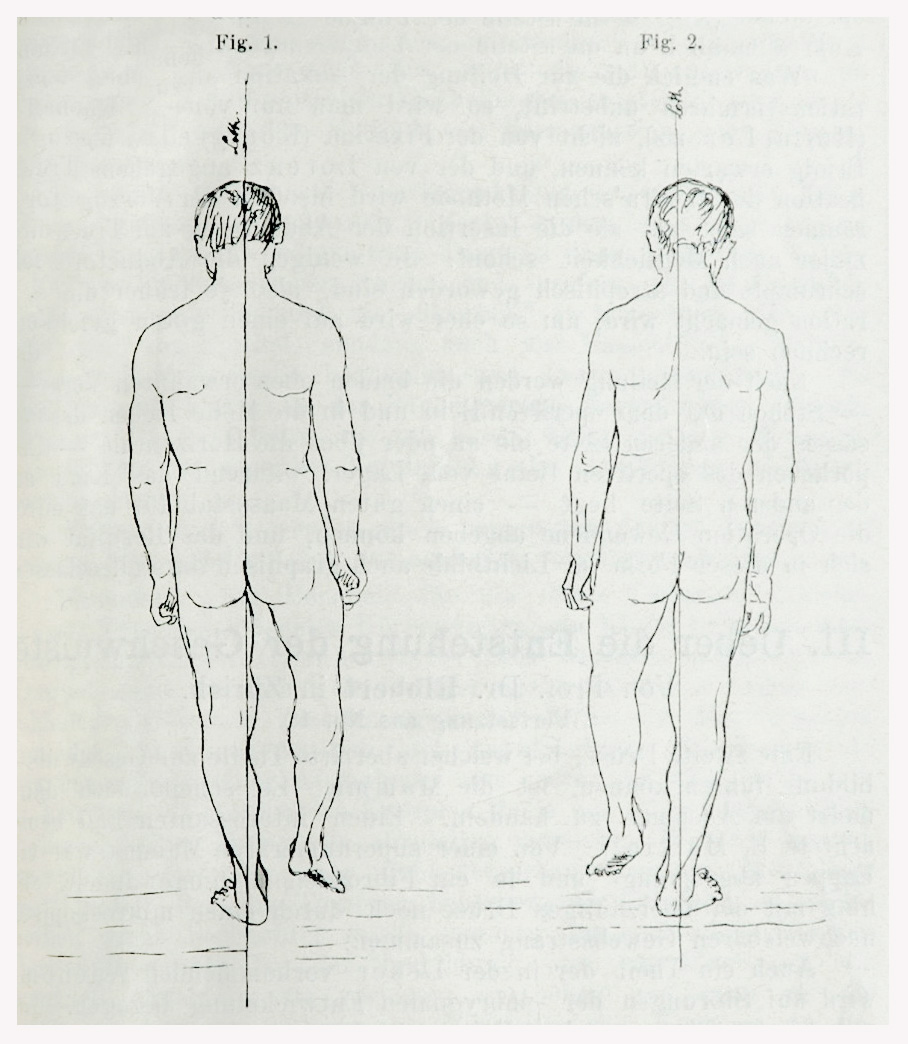
- Positive Trendelenburg's sign (on right)
- Differential diagnosis: paralyzed abductor muscles

Trendelenburg's sign is found in people with weak or paralyzed abductor muscles of the hip, namely gluteus medius and gluteus minimus. It is named after the German surgeon Friedrich Trendelenburg. It is often incorrectly referenced as the Trendelenburg test which is a test for vascular insufficiency in the lower extremities.

== Signs and symptoms ==
The Trendelenburg sign is said to be positive if, when standing on one leg (the 'stance leg'), the pelvis severely drops on the side opposite to the stance leg (the 'swing limb'). The muscle weakness is present on the side of the stance leg. If the patient compensates for this weakness by tilting their trunk/thorax to the affected side, then the pelvis will be raised, rather than dropped, on the side opposite to the stance leg. Ergo, in the same situation, the patient's hip may be dropped or raised, dependent upon whether the patient is actively compensating or not. Compensation shifts the center of gravity to the affected side, and also decreases the angle between the hip adductor muscles and femur, both of which decrease the forces needing to be applied by the hip adductor muscles to maintain relevant posture.

The gluteus medius is very important during the stance phase of the gait cycle to maintain both hips at the same level. One leg stance accounts for about 60% of the gait cycle, and during the stance phase, there is approximately three times the body weight transmitted to the hip joint. The hip abductors' action accounts for two thirds of that body weight. A Trendelenburg sign can occur when there is presence of a muscular dysfunction (weakness of the gluteus medius or minimus) or when someone is experiencing pain.

== Causes ==
A positive Trendelenburg's sign is caused by weakness or ineffective action of the abductor muscles of the lower limb, the gluteus medius muscle and the gluteus minimus muscle.

- Damage to the motor nerve supply of the lateral gluteal muscles (gluteus medius muscle and gluteus minimus muscle)
  - Polio involving L5 (foot drop may also be seen because L5 innervates the tibialis anterior muscle).
  - Damage to the superior gluteal nerve.
- Temporary or permanent weakness of the lateral glutei
  - Tendinitis.
  - Penetrating injury.
  - Infection, abscess – blood borne, post-traumatic or post-surgical.
- Ineffective action (insufficient leverage) of the lateral glutei
  - Greater trochanteric avulsion.
  - Fracture, (or non-union) of the femoral neck.
  - Coxa vara (the angle between the femoral neck head and shaft is less than 120 degrees).
- Damage to the hip joint (fulcrum) - Chronic or Developmental Hip Dislocation/Dysplasia
  - Osteonecrosis.
  - Legg-Calve-Perthes disease.
  - Developmental dysplasia.
  - Chronic infection.
  - Uncorrected traumatic dislocation.

== See also ==
- Gait abnormality
- Superior gluteal nerve
- Trendelenburg gait
