= Friedrich Trendelenburg =

German surgeon

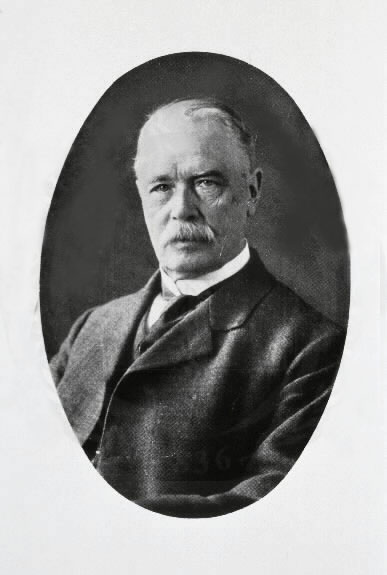
Friedrich Trendelenburg, c. 1910

Friedrich Trendelenburg (/ˈtrɛndələnbɜːrɡ/; German: [ˈfʁiːdʁɪç ˈtʁɛndələnbʊʁk]; 24 May 1844 – 15 December 1924) was a German surgeon. He was son of the philosopher Friedrich Adolf Trendelenburg, father of the pharmacologist Paul Trendelenburg, the physiologist Wilhelm Trendelenburg and of the politician Ernst Trendelenburg and grandfather of the pharmacologist Ullrich Georg Trendelenburg.

Trendelenburg was born in Berlin and studied medicine at the University of Glasgow and the University of Edinburgh. He completed his studies at the Charité - Universitätsmedizin Berlin under Bernhard von Langenbeck, receiving his doctorate in 1866. He practiced medicine at the University of Rostock and the University of Bonn. In 1895 he became surgeon-in-chief at the University of Leipzig.

Trendelenburg was interested in the history of surgery. He founded the German Surgical Society in 1872. Trendelenburg was also interested in the surgical removal of pulmonary emboli. His student Martin Kirschner performed the first successful pulmonary embolectomy in 1924, shortly before Trendelenburg's death. He died in 1924 of cancer of the mandible, aged 80.

== Named after Friedrich Trendelenburg ==
A number of medical treatments and terminologies have been named after Friedrich Trendelenburg, including:

- Brodie–Trendelenburg percussion test (also accredited to Sir Benjamin Collins Brodie) is a test for incompetent valves in superficial veins.
- Trendelenburg's cannula: a cannula used during surgery of the larynx to prevent the patient from swallowing blood during surgery involving the head and neck.
- Trendelenburg gait: an abnormal gait caused by weakness of the abductor muscles of the lower limb, including the gluteus medius muscle and gluteus minimus muscle.
- Trendelenburg operation: ligation of the great saphenous vein, for the treatment of varicose veins. This term may also apply to pulmonary thrombectomy.
- Trendelenburg position, in which the patient is placed on a bed which is put into incline such that the patient's head is lower than his feet.
- Reverse Trendelenburg position, in which the patient is placed on a bed which is put into incline such that the patient's feet is lower than his head.
- Trendelenburg's sign: a sign of congenital dislocation of the hip.
- Trendelenburg's test: a test for varicose veins as well as a test to assess hip mobility.

== See also ==
- List of eponymous medical signs
