= Trendelenburg test =

Medical test

- Purpose: competency of the valves in the superficial and deep veins of the legs

The Trendelenburg Test or Brodie–Trendelenburg test is a test which can be carried out as part of a physical examination to determine the competency of the valves in the superficial and deep veins of the legs in patients with varicose veins.

== Procedure ==
With the patient in the supine position, the leg is flexed at the hip and raised above heart level. The veins will empty due to gravity or with the assistance of the examiner's hand squeezing blood towards the heart.

A tourniquet is then applied around the upper thigh to compress the superficial veins but not too tight as to occlude the deeper veins. The leg is then lowered by asking the patient to stand.

Normally the superficial saphenous vein will fill from below within 30–35 seconds as blood from the capillary beds reaches the veins; if the superficial veins fill more rapidly with the tourniquet in place there is valvular incompetence below the level of the tourniquet in the "deep" or "communicating" veins. After 20 seconds, if there has been no rapid filling, the tourniquet is released. If there is sudden filling at this point, it indicates that the deep and communicating veins are competent but the superficial veins are incompetent.

The test is reported in two parts, the initial standing up of the patient (positive or negative based on rapid filling) and the second phase once the tourniquet is removed (positive or negative based upon rapid filling).

For example, a possible outcome of the test would be negative-positive meaning that the initial phase of the test was negative indicating competence in the deep and communicating veins and the second phase of the test was positive meaning that there is superficial vein incompetence.

The test can be repeated with the tourniquet at different levels to further pinpoint the level of valvular incompetence:

- above the knee - to assess the mid-thigh perforators
- below the knee - to assess incompetence between the short saphenous vein and the popliteal vein.

Superficial veins of the leg normally empty into deep veins, however retrograde filling occurs when valves are incompetent, leading to varicose veins.

The test is named for Friedrich Trendelenburg, who described it in 1891.

== See also ==
- Brodie–Trendelenburg percussion test
