= Paul Trendelenburg =

German pharmacologist (1884–1931)

Paul Trendelenburg (24 March 1884, Bonn – 4 February 1931, Berlin) was a German pharmacologist.

He studied medicine at the universities of Grenoble, Leipzig and Freiburg, where from 1909 to 1918, he worked as an assistant in the pharmacological institute and at the surgical clinic. In 1912 he received his habilitation in pharmacology and toxicology, and from 1916 was an associate professor. In 1919 he became a full professor at the University of Rostock and later on, he served as a professor of pharmacology at the universities of Freiburg (from 1923) and Berlin (from 1927).

He is known for his research of adrenaline, for the development of biological measurement procedures for the standardization of hormone preparations and for his investigations regarding the role of the hypothalamic hormones vasopressin and oxytocin. His name is associated with the so-called "Trendelenburg preparation", a preparation used in determining the actions of pharmacological agents on peristalsis.

He was the son of surgeon Friedrich Trendelenburg and the brother of physiologist Wilhelm Trendelenburg. His son, Ullrich Georg Trendelenburg, was also a pharmacologist.

== Selected works ==
- Physiologische und pharmakologische Untersuchungen an der isolierten Bronchialmuskulatur, 1912 – Physiological and pharmacological studies on isolated bronchial musculature.
- Grundlagen der allgemeinen und speziellen Arzneiverordnung, 1926 – Fundamentals of general and specific drug regulation.
- Keimdrüsen, Hypophyse, Nebennieren, 1929 – Gonads, pituitary and adrenal glands.
- Die hormone, ihre physiologie und pharmakologie, 2 volumes, 1929-34 – The hormone, its physiology and pharmacology.
