= Barmat scandal =

1920s political scandal in the Weimar Republic

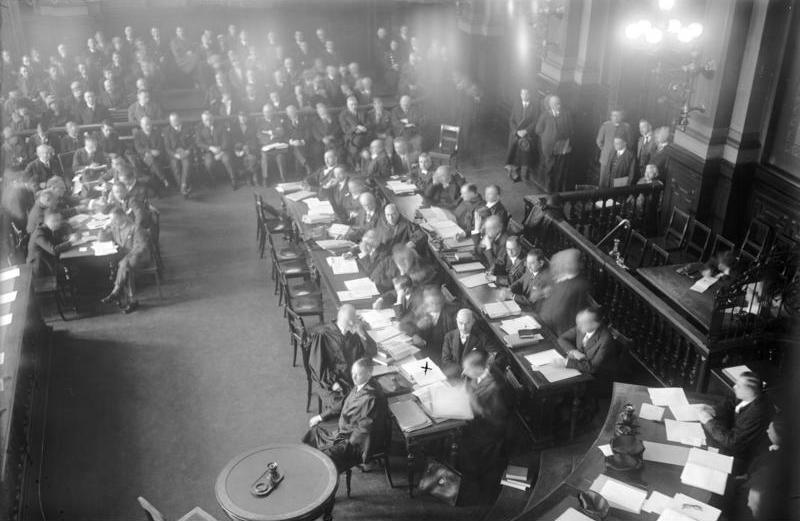
Passing court judgment on Julius and Henry Barmat in 1928

The Barmat scandal (German: Barmat-Skandal) was a political scandal that occurred in the Weimar Republic in 1925. The Social Democratic Party of Germany (SPD), and to a lesser extent the German Centre Party, were implicated in acts of corruption, war profiteering, fraud, bribery, and other financial misconduct with German Jewish (Ashkenazi) businessman Julius Barmat between 1918 and 1924. High-ranking SPD officials and a Centre Party minister were investigated and publicly accused of misconduct in an investigation by the Prussian Landtag.

The Barmat scandal was a major political affair in Germany and provided the German right-wing with a basis for attacking the SPD and the Weimar Republic itself. Gustav Bauer, the former Chancellor of Germany, was forced to resign his seat in the Reichstag for his involvement. The scandal damaged the SPD's reputation in the run-up to the 1925 German presidential election and contributed to right-wing candidate Paul von Hindenburg being elected President of Germany.

Antisemitism in connection with the Barmat scandal also featured prominently in Nazi propaganda, since Barmat was Jewish, and argued that wealthy Jews were exploiting the Weimar Republic and the SPD to do their bidding.

== Background ==
=== Political context ===
The Weimar Republic was established after Imperial Germany's defeat in World War I in November 1918, with the new Weimar Constitution introducing a semi-presidential system of government. Friedrich Ebert of the Social Democratic Party (SPD) was the President of Germany from the end of the war until his death in February 1925. Gustav Bauer was leader of the SPD and the Chancellor of Germany from June 1919 to March 1920. Bauer and Ebert presided over a post-war Germany that was plagued with political violence, instability, and an economic crisis.

=== Julius Barmat ===
Julius Barmat was a Polish Jew originally from Uman in Congress Poland, who became a wholesale merchant with a "less than perfect character" in the Netherlands in 1906. Barmat benefited from political patronage in left-wing circles, having joined the Social Democratic Workers' Party in 1908 and given the Second International free office space in his Amsterdam home. Consequently, he mingled with SPD officials and developed connections that were helpful in his future dealings. Barmat had connections with Ernst Heilmann (SPD leader in the Prussian Landtag), SPD Chairman Otto Wels, Bauer, and Ebert, which he indiscreetly bragged about. Heilmann, who was also Jewish, became close friends with Barmat, writing letters of recommendation and served on the boards of six Barmat companies, though he did not accept financial rewards. Wilhelm Richter, the chief of the Berlin Police, received gifts.

== Misconduct ==
After World War I, Barmat bought foodstuffs from the Netherlands to export to Germany, which had suffered badly from food shortages during and after the war. Barmat made a large amount of money and was, at least from the view of many German nationalists, engaging in war profiteering. Barmat received German travel visas and lived in Berlin from 1919, establishing business relations with various state offices, including the Prussian State Bank. In return, they donated around 20,000 Reichsmarks to SPD newspapers, founded a children's home in Pirna, and paid commissions to Bauer. The German federal government's postal department would generate considerable amounts of cash as a result of the mail, and invested idle funds with Barmat's investment company. The Prussian State Bank also loaned a considerable sum of money to Barmat, who engaged in currency speculation with the funds, and his investment company collapsed in late 1924. Both the German federal government and the Prussian State Bank lost several million U.S. dollars as a result of the firm's collapse, and a Reichstag commission was formed to investigate the matter. In addition, a commission of the Prussian Landtag was also formed to investigate. Most of the investigative work and almost all of the publicity came from the Landtag committee or actually as a result of its work, rather than from the national committee of the Reichstag.

== Arrests and revelations ==
On 30 December 1924, various Prussian State Bank officials were arrested, while Barmat and his brothers were arrested early in the morning of the next day, on New Year's Eve. Preliminary investigation suggested that several prominent SPD officials had received bribes, kickbacks, or other financial favours in exchange for their support of government contracts with the Barmats. A prosecutor leaked information to the Berliner Lokal-Anzeiger, a right-wing newspaper which was controlled by Alfred Hugenberg.

=== Bauer ===
Bauer did not handle the press accusations well, kept silent when the press exposed his membership on the board of a Barmat company, and issued a denial of any involvement in the affair in January 1925 after the arrest of the Barmat brothers. In particular, he denied any benefit by way of financial remuneration. That was a most unfortunate public statement for Bauer because his opponents had specific documentary evidence that it was a lie.

The first climax of the Prussian investigating commission took place in late January 1925, with Bauer, a prominent Social Democrat, giving evidence. During his period of government service, he had helped Barmat win food supply contracts with various federal government departments. After leaving office, he helped Barmat one time with a government scrap metal deal, and was to receive a commission from Barmat for the help. In late 1923, their relationship ended over a dispute as to the amount of "commission" that Bauer would receive for the deal.

Bauer had publicly denied that he served on any Barmat supervisory board, but this was a lie, and he was forced to admit as much under the cross-examination by the investigating commission. He was also forced to admit that his actions in helping Barmat win government contracts had been considerably more frequent and more involved that his previous statements to the press had indicated. Despite those reversals of his prior statements, he steadfastly and repeatedly continued to deny to the investigating commission that he had received any financial compensation from Barmat. However, in early February, only a few days after the testimony, the Berliner Lokal-Anzeiger reprinted a letter from Barmat to Bauer as a part of an article on the scandal. This letter was written during the period of their 1923 commission dispute over the scrap metal deal and identified the occasions on which Bauer had received money from Barmat. Bauer was caught in a bald-faced lie and, it would appear, had committed perjury in denying any receipt of compensation. The SPD promptly asked Bauer to resign from the party and the Reichstag, which he did on 6 February.

=== Ebert ===
The 1925 German presidential election was due to take place in spring of 1925, so the German right-wing would not forfeit a chance to discredit Ebert by association with scandal. A motion was made in the Prussian commission in early February to investigate Ebert's knowledge of the Barmat scandal, particularly any involvement by his office with the Barmats. The testimony of 23 February 1925 before the commission established that Barmat had received letters of recommendation bearing the presidential seal. The right-wing press made much of that testimony. It turned out that an office employee had indeed dispatched several letters of recommendation to Barmat, bearing the presidential seal. Ebert had unfortunately recommended in 1919 for Barmat to be given a permanent visa for his many business trips to and from Germany. Ebert was diagnosed with appendicitis and peritonitis on 26 February and died two days later. Mommsen claims that Ebert's death had been caused in part by the strain brought on by the Barmat scandal, particularly a result of the right-wing vilification of the Prussian government.

In October 1925, the final report cleared Ebert of any wrongdoing, finding that he had committed no improprieties in the affair, and that his reputation was stainless in regard to the scandal. While Bauer and Richter were reprimanded for careless and incautious conflict of interest, they had not profited directly or indirectly from the loans that had been made to Barmat by the Prussian State Bank.

=== Höfle ===
Julius and Henry Barmat met with Dr. Anton Höfle, the Minister of Posts, in June 1924 and paid him bribes of some 120,000 Reichsmarks over several months. In January 1924, hyperinflation had begun to be tackled by the Rentenmark, so by June 1924 the bribes paid to Höfle were worth a significant amount. The Barmat brothers then borrowed 14.5 million Reichsmarks from the Postal Department in September 1924. The loan was not secured, and the German federal government's money was lost when Barmat's investment speculations turned sour. Höfle, a member of the German Centre Party, resigned his Reichstag seat on 9 February 1925 and was arrested on 10 February 1925. On 20 April 1925, Höfle died in custody from a drug overdose, six days before the second round of the presidential election. The Centre Party press accused the prosecutors of pumping Höfle full of narcotics so that he would be available for questioning and implied that amounted to a form of homicide. The German right-wing claimed that Höfle's death was a suicide, which amounted to his confession of guilt in the affair.

=== Richter ===
Three days after Hofle's arrest, Wilhelm Richter, the Police President of Prussia, was placed on an involuntary "leave" and a week later was dispatched into "interim retirement".

=== Heilmann ===
Heilmann revealed no compromising information other than that he had supported Barmat's request for additional funds in early December 1924 in discussions with the Prussian Finance Minister. He was never charged or sanctioned, although some commentators considered his intervention with the Ministry of Finance to be improper.

== Presidential election of 1925 ==
The SPD had performed very well in the December 1924 general election, which occurred only weeks before the scandal was exposed, but were faced with growing competition from various right-wing and centrist parties. The formation of the new Reichstag was complex and took until 15 January which resulted in the Rechtsblock, a coalition of the right-wing and centrist parties with Hans Luther (an independent) as Chancellor. The Social Democrats went into opposition against the coalition of the Centre Party, the German People's Party, the German National People's Party and promised the Luther government a "ruthless fight".

The Barmat affair was one of the Weimar Republic's biggest scandals, principally because of the upcoming presidential election. The scandal was exploited by the right-wing press, in particular the Nazi Party, to express its underlying anti-Semitic, anti-socialist and anti-democratic sentiments. It frequently appeared as a topic at right-wing political rallies. The campaign appealed to the German public, angry for the hardships and perceived injustices that Germany continued to suffer, referring to the "corruption economy" which was a result of the SPD leadership in post-war Germany. Some right-wing outlets argued that corruption was an inherent characteristic of democracy, and that the only solution was the abandonment of democracy and a return to the ways of the autocratic past. The right-wing Nationalpost stated the themes that the Barmat scandal was not just a tale of corruption within the Prussian State Bank or the Postal Department, but was rather a scandal of social democracy itself. It contended that leading Social Democrats had improperly used political influence to secure favourable treatment (such as loans and contracts) for the Barmats in exchange for payments and other financial benefits, which flowed both to themselves individually and to the party. Political leaflets based on the history of the scandal were distributed throughout the countryside. The scandal provided ammunition for right-wing propagandists, who could fulminate against Jewish speculators and profiteers, all manners of socialist politicians, and others who supported the Weimar Republic. Frustrated voters had an opportunity to channel their resentment against inflation and war profiteers against specific targets, and to transfer the responsibility for those ills to the Social Democrats.

Otto Braun was chosen by the SPD as their presidential candidate, though Ebert was seen as a formidable contender for re-election before the scandal and his sudden death. Braun came second in the first round of elections, but no candidate secured a majority and so, under the Weimar Constitution, a second round of elections had to be conducted. In the second round, the SPD aligned with the Centre Party through a political deal in which Braun withdrew from the presidential race and was elected Minister President of Prussia on 3 April 1925 with the Centre Party's support. In return, the SPD supported the Centre Party candidate Wilhelm Marx for president.

The right-wing abandoned its first-round candidate, the German People's Party's Karl Jarres, and instead offered up General Paul von Hindenburg as an independent. The right-wing Reichsblock called the coalition between the Centre Party and Social Democrats the Barmatblock, and leaflets and pamphlets that tied the coalition with the Barmat scandal were distributed widely throughout Germany.

Hindenburg won on April 26 by a margin of 900,000 votes, largely as a result of his appeal to new voters who had stayed home in the first round. He had campaigned on the basis of restoring nonpartisanship to the presidential office, and of a general restoration of social harmony. The press campaign was a key in the close election, as Fulda observed (p. 104):

The key to [Hindenburg's] success lay in the mobilization of former non-voters, and their dissatisfaction with the present system.... Hindenburg [might not have] scraped into office without four months of media barrage aimed at discrediting the Republic.

== Sentencing ==
In early 1928, Julius and Henry Barmat were sentenced to 11 months and 6 months of imprisonment, respectively, for bribery. After serving his sentence, Julius Barmat left Germany for the Low Countries. He was caught once again in another corruption scandal in which he was accused of bribery to obtain loans, which ended up defrauding the Belgian National Bank of 34 million gold francs. He died in Saint-Gilles Prison in Forest, near Brussels, on 6 January 1938.

== See also ==
- Sklarek scandal
- Glossary of the Weimar Republic

== Reference works ==
- Berkowitz, Michael (2007). The Crime of My Very Existence: Nazism and the Myth of Jewish Criminality. University of California Press. pp. 17–18. ISBN 978-0-520-25114-4.
- Davidson, Eugene (2004). The Unmaking of Adolf Hitler. University of Missouri Press. ISBN 0-8262-1529-7.
- Fischer, Ruth (2006). Stalin and German Communism: A Study in the Origins of the State Party. Transaction Publishers. ISBN 0-87855-822-5.
- Fulda, Bernhard (2009). Press and Politics in the Weimar Republic. Oxford University Press. ISBN 978-0-19-954778-4.
- Geyer, Martin H. (2018-03-05). Kapitalismus und politische Moral in der Zwischenkriegszeit oder: Wer war Julius Barmat? (in German). Hamburger Edition. ISBN 978-3-86854-319-3.
- Kauders, Anthony (1996). German Politics and the Jews: Düsseldorf and Nuremberg, 1910–1933. Oxford University Press. ISBN 0-19-820631-3.
- Mommsen, Hans (1998). The Rise and Fall of Weimar Democracy. UNC Press. ISBN 0-8078-4721-6.
- Poor, Harold L. (1968). Kurt Tucholsky and the Ordeal of Germany, 1914-1935. Scribner. ISBN 978-1-125-81765-0.
