= Ludwig Frank =

German lawyer and politician (1874–1914)

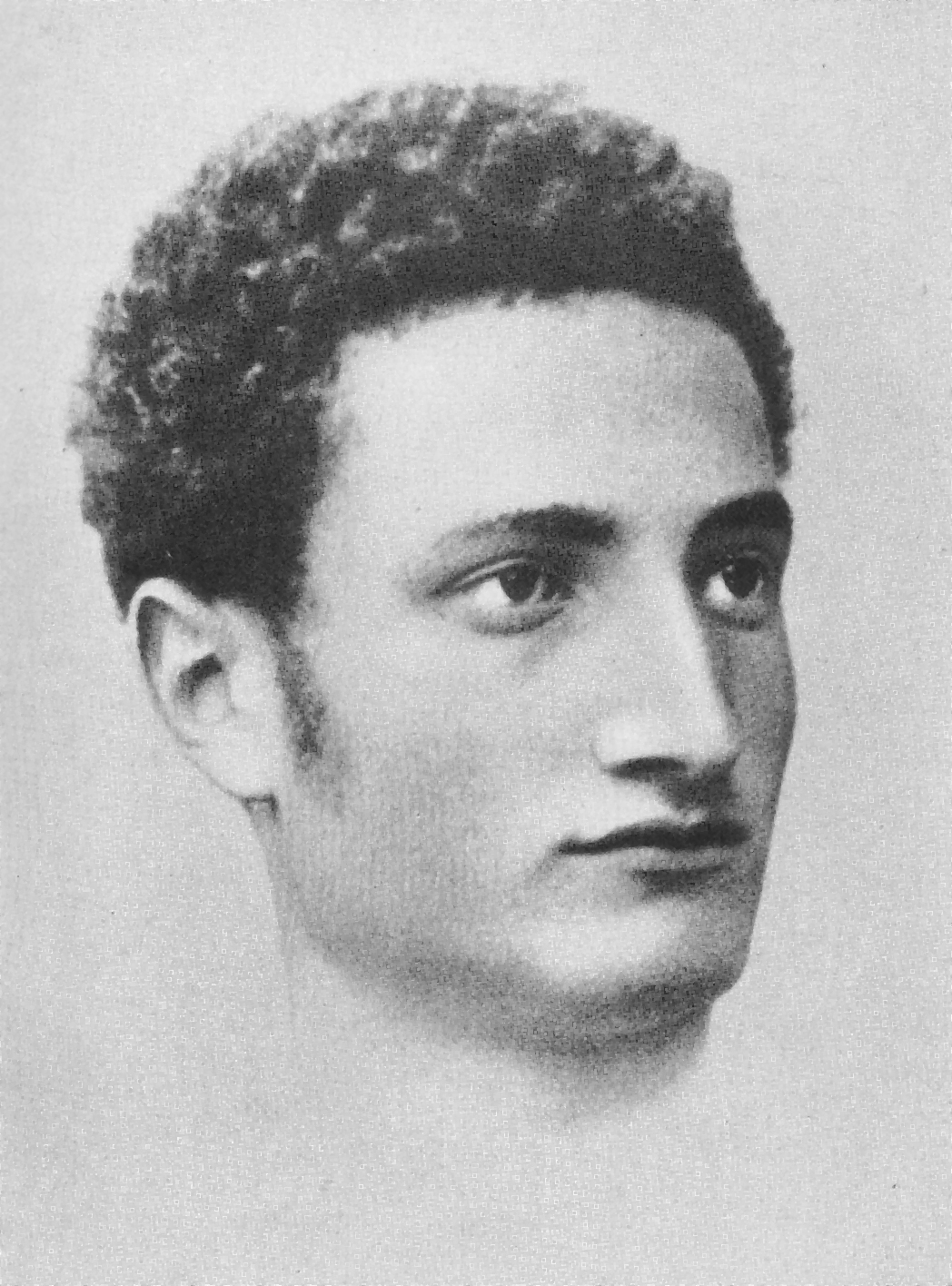
- Ludwig Frank, probably at or shortly after his school graduation, 1893
- Born: 23 May 1874; Nonnenweier (Schwanau), Baden, Germany
- Died: 3 September 1914 (aged 40); Baccarat, Meurthe-et-Moselle, France
- Cause of death: Killed in action
- Education: Freiburg; Berlin
- Occupations: Lawyer; Politician
- Political party: SPD
- Parents: Samuel Frank (1841–1915) (father); Fanny Frank (1837–1926) (mother)

Ludwig Frank (23 May 1874 – 3 September 1914) was a German lawyer and politician of the Social Democratic Party (SPD). He represented his party in the Baden Ständeversammlung (the Grand Duchy's parliament) in Karlsruhe between 1905 and 1914, as well as in the Reichstag in Berlin between 1907 and 1914.

He was active as an organiser within the socialist youth movement, and emerged at an early stage as an advocate of political reformism in south Germany. He was willing to work with liberal politicians in matters of shared concern, such as the need for improvements in state institutions and working conditions. The replacement of the infamous "Dreiklassenwahlrecht" (three-class voting system) of Prussia was a particular priority, though he died before this democratic reform was enacted. Much of the reformist agenda that he backed was already considered relatively mainstream in Baden, his home region, but drew more concerted criticism in other parts of Germany.

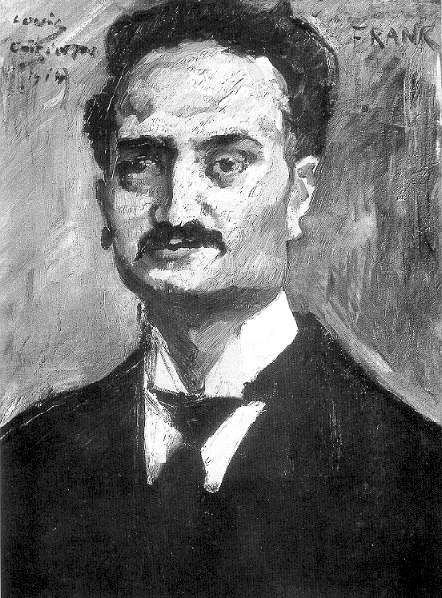
Portrait of Ludwig Frank by Lovis Corinth

During the build-up to the First World War Frank tried to engineer an understanding between parliamentarians in France and Germany. At his instigation parliamentarians in Switzerland invited German and French counterparts to a conference in Bern in order to progress the project by devising international criminal justice mechanisms that could contribute to the peaceful settlement of disputes between governments. The Bern conference was held in May 1913, but the outbreak of war in July 1914 demonstrated the near-term limitations of the project. Over the next few weeks of the war Ludwig Frank emerged as a leading and uncompromising SPD proponent in the Reichstag of a parliamentary truce for the duration of the war. Ludwig Frank volunteered for military service on 5 August 1914 and was enrolled into the Imperial Army on 13 August 1914 as a member of the "Mannheim Landwehr Battalion". Despite his passionate attempts to avoid the outbreak of war, now that it was under way he became convinced that "the foundations for unforeseeable progress will be laid in this war", as he explained in a letter to his friend and political ally Albert Südekum, sent from the frontline on 31 August 1914. His first experience of battle came on 3 September 1914 in a skirmish near Nossoncourt, a strategically located village in the hill-country south-east of Nancy. He was shot in the head and died a few hours later.

== Biography ==
=== Provenance ===
Ludwig Frank, the second of his parents' four recorded children, was born at Nonnenweier, a village positioned to the west of Lahr and short distance upriver of Kehl, on the strip of fertile flatlands that ran along the right-bank of the Rhine. His father, Samuel Frank (1841–1915), was a businessman. His mother, born Fanny Frank (1837–1926), and both his grandmothers were all the daughters of rabbis. Religion played no significant part in his own childhood and upbringing, however.

=== School ===
In 1880 he was enrolled at the Simultanschule in Nonnenweier, an elementary school at which children from Christian and Jewish backgrounds were taught together, and which he attended for the next five years. There were no fixed ratios, but during Frank's time three of the course teachers at the school were identified as Christian and one as Jewish. In terms of religious affiliation, Nonnenweier was a mixed community. Census data show that there were approximately 200 people identifying themselves as Jewish, and there is no indication that Frank encountered concrete race-based discrimination as he grew up, but he would have been conscious of the low-level background antisemitism that persisted across western Europe during the nineteenth century.

He was then prepared for admission to secondary school by the local Lutheran minister, and in 1885 transferred to the "Gymnasium" in Lahr, an hour's walk to the east, across the fields. His elder brother had already been a pupil at the school for several years. Ludwig Frank was not a particularly compliant pupil, but he nevertheless excelled at his school work. In order to avoid the daily trek from Nonnenweier, he rented a room in the town itself. While still a schoolboy, he joined the Lahr "Lessing Society" which a Jewish primary school teacher had established. A fellow member was Paul Engert, a lithographer and a committed Social Democrat. Frank was strongly influenced by Engert, and by other politically like-minded society members. He was also influenced towards socialist ideas by Emil Hauth, the teacher and lodging house keeper from whom he was renting his room. The Social Democratic party was, at this stage, still outside Germany's political mainstream and was indeed till 1890, outlawed under Bismarck's Anti-Socialist Laws. Nevertheless, long before he left school Ludwig Frank had studied works by Friedrich Engels, August Bebel, Karl Kautsky, and Franz Mehring. Sources are largely silent over how much his parents knew about the parallel curriculum that he pursued after school hours: it is a matter for speculation how they will have reacted when they discovered that their second son was growing into a "socialist intellectual".

At the end of his time at school Frank passed his Abitur (final exam) with a grade that placed him at the top of the list. As Primus Omnium, he was given the honour of delivering the graduation speech on behalf of his cohort. This he did on 23 July 1893, taking as his subject "The importance of Lessing in his own time". His thesis seems to have taken his listeners by surprise. He drew direct links from Lessing's writings to contemporary Social Democratic demands. It was not enough to join with Lessing in the search for truth: it was necessary to follow through with practical consequences. Those feeling a sense of obligation to the Enlightenment icon must also take cognizance of the sufferings of the disadvantaged and dedicate themselves to the welfare of all. They must serve the "common good". Frank's speech created waves well beyond Lahr. In Karlsruhe, the Education Ministry refused to provide him with his graduation certificate, relenting only after a large part of the press came out in support of the boy, and following a number of public protests.

=== University ===
In 1893 Frank transferred to the University of Freiburg and embarked on a degree course in Jurisprudence. He also took the opportunity to attend lectures on Sociology and Zoology. He performed his Military service as a ""one year volunteer" between April 1894 and April 1895. He was able to do this while remaining in Freiburg, which according to some sources permitted him to pursue his academic studies in parallel with his military training. At Freiburg he was a co-founder of the Student Social-Scientific Association ("Sozialwissenschaftliche Studentenverein"), which combined social activities with intellectual debate. In the Autumn/Fall of 1895 he switched to the Frederick William University (as it was known at that time) in Berlin. While maintaining his focus on Jurisprudence, he also found time to take part in classes on Germany's unfolding palette of new and revised social legislation and - more critically - on Socialism. He returned to Freiburg when he concluded his undergraduate studies by passing his Level I government law exams in 1897. He would pass the Level II exams three years later in 1900. Ludwig Frank also received his doctorate on 23 November 1899, in return for a piece of work on craft guilds in the Grand Duchy.

=== Beyond university ===
In April 1897 he embarked on his "Referendariat" (loosely, "legal apprenticeship period") work with a succession of small-town legal firms in Lahr, Staufen, Mosbach and Waldshut. In May 1898 he moved to Karlsruhe where he remained for a year, before moving on the Mannheim where he completed his legal training with two more firms.

During this period Frank also published poems, aphorisms, short stories and "folk tales" in the popular left-of-centre satirical magazine Der wahre Jacob.

In 1900 Ludwig Frank embarked on a career as a lawyer in Mannheim, accepted as a junior partner by Dr. Julius Loeb, whose law firm he already knew as a result of having been employed there during his legal apprenticeship. It was clear from the outset, however, that he was more interested in working as a journalist in support of socialism and democracy than in any challenges or opportunities that his work as a newly qualified lawyer might offer. According to one commentator his decision to make his base in Mannheim, the largest industrial city in Baden, and directly across the river from Ludwigshafen in the "Bavarian West", a boom city thanks in particular, to the accelerating expansion of the chemicals industry, was no accident. The growth of the industrial cities went hand in hand with that of the labour movement and of socialist awareness in Germany.

On 1903 Frank moved on and set himself up in his own legal business, still in Mannheim. This might be construed as professional progress. However, according to at least one source it came about only after Dr.Loeb, managing partner at the firm with which he had been working, proved reluctant to renew his contract, on account of concerns for his very active involvement with the Social Democrats - still perceived by many, even in traditionally liberal Baden, as a radical movement beyond the political mainstream.

=== Politics and Mannheim ===
Frank joined the SPD in 1900. In the Autumn/Fall of 1903 he attended the Party Conference at Dresden as a delegate. The next year, in August, he represented Baden Social Democrats in Amsterdam as a delegate to the International Socialist Congress. Later that year, in October 1904, he joined the Mannheim "Bürgerausschuss" (literally, "... citizens committee") as an SPD representative.

In 1905 Ludwig Frank was elected to membership of the lower house of the Baden Ständeversammlung (parliament) as one of 6 SPD members in the 63 seat assembly. Less than two years later, in January 1907, he was also elected to the Imperial Reichstag. In that year's elections the SPD won only 43 of the 397 seats in the parliament despite receiving nearly 29% of votes counted and recorded. This was due to the uneven size of the electoral districts, which disadvantaged voters from densely populated industrial regions. Frank represented Electoral district "Baden: 11", the Mannheim-Weinheim district. He had also, shortly before this, taken over leadership of the Mannheim party branch following the death of the widely respected previous incumbent, August Dreesbach.

In Mannheim, described sometimes at that time as "The Stronghold of Social Democracy in Baden", Ludwig Frank's public and social involvement extended far beyond the local SPD. He was closely involved with institutions that contributed to the city's intellectual and cultural life. He was a member of the "Verein für Volksbildung" ("League for People's Education") which supported a "Lesehalle" (Reading Club) in the city's Neckarstadt quarter, down by the rivers. He also maintained cordial links to Mannheim's "haute-bourgeoisie" and intellectuals, and was a frequent presence at the salon events arranged by Bertha Hirsch, and was accordingly well networked with the artists, poets and culturally inclined politicians in the area. Frank was a co-founder of Mannheim's "Gartenvorstadt-Genossenschaft" (loosely, "Garden suburb co-operative") and sat as a member of its supervisory board. He belonged to the local Peace Society group and to "Liederkranz", a Jewish choral society. Through his involvement these and other local organisations and activities Ludwig Franz became a well-known member of the community, respected by many whose party loyalties did not necessarily lead them to vote for Social Democrats.

In October 1904 Ludwig Frank established the "Verband junger Arbeiter Mannheims" ("Mannheim Association of Young Workers"), drawing inspiration from the Belgian "Jeunes gardes socialistes" set up eighteen years earlier.

=== Pioneer of the Youth Labour Movement ===
Frank had learned about the achievements of the Belgian young workers' movement in 1904 when he was in Amsterdam for the International Socialist Congress, and resolved to use it as a model for comparable developments in Baden. He started out by publishing a couple of articles on the theme of Youth and Socialism. One of these appeared in Die Neue Zeit, the principal theoretical journal of the SPD during this period, and the second was printed by Clara Zetkin's bimonthly magazine Die Gleichheit, produced by and for the "proletarian-feminist" wing of the social democratic movement. He followed through later in 1904 with the establishment of the "Verband junger Arbeiter Mannheims" which he ran himself During 1905 the example was followed with a number of other young workers' organisations set up in different parts of the Grand Duchy. In February 1906 these associations met together for the first time at Karlsruhe. Together they now established an equivalent potentially national organisation, the "Verband junger Arbeiter Deutschland", with headquarters in Mannheim. Frank at once suggested the need for the organisation to produce its own magazine which should, he said, be called "Die junge Garde": he took responsibility for the publication's editorial direction. The first edition appeared in April 1906.

At the end of September 1906 the "Verband junger Arbeiter Deutschland" held their first General Meeting. 52 delegates attended, representing 37 local groups from places in southern Germany. Between them they represented approximately 3,000 members. There were no delegates for the Prussian north of Germany, where political associations of young people were not permitted.

In 1907 it was the turn of Stuttgart to host the International Socialist Congress. An International Youth Conference was scheduled to run concurrently, Ludwig Frank, Karl Liebknecht and Henri de Man worked together on the necessary planning and organisation.

Frank's work with the young workers movement was heavily circumscribed by the pan-German "Reichsvereinsgesetz" (anti [political] association law) after 1908. Arranging gatherings involving young people under 18 became a criminal offence throughout Germany (unless they served "national objectives"). Frank had spoken out strongly against the new legislation when it came before the Reichstag, but he accepted the new situation and set about disbanding the young workers' associations. "Die junge Garde", which by this time had approximately 9,000 subscribers, ceased publication. The SPD did not give up entirely on political organisation of young people, however. There were still local youth committees set up, and there was still a centralised co-ordination function provided quietly by a "Central Office of Germany's Young Workers".

=== Baden Ständeversammlung (parliament) in Karlsruhe ===
==== Bipartisan politics ====
In Autumn/Fall 1905 Ludwig Frank was elected to the Ständeversammlung, representing the important Karlsruhe constituency. He worked closely with his friend Wilhelm Kolb, the leader of the SPD group in the assembly. Frank and Kolb were political soulmates, especially over political reformism, and Frank took on the position of Kolb's parliamentary deputy in the lower house of the bicameral legislature. Frank turned out to be a skilful political strategist, and he played a key role in shaping developments in Baden during the politically eventful ten-year run-up to the war.

==== 1905 - 1909 ====
The period was a formative one in respect of political institutions both at a devolved and at a national level. Given the way in which support was distributed in Baden, it became important for Frank and for the Social Democrats in the parliament that they should learn to work together effectively with the so-called "bourgeois parties". Commentators characterise the collaboration in the Ständeversammlung between the SPD, the "free thinking radicals" and the Baden National Liberals as part of the emergence of a new more broadly based political bloc ("Großblock") of the centre-left. The extent to which the parties worked together in the Ständeversammlung was accepted as generally unremarkable by social democrats in the south of Germany. Elsewhere in Germany especially in Prussia and Saxony, the idea of such a political strategy would have met with strong resistance at this stage, because the political mainstream and social conditions more generally in these parts of the evolving German federation were very much less liberal, at least until 1918.

What amounted to a local electoral pact with the Catholic Centre Party, initially against the National Liberals, formed the basis for a successful strategy in Baden in 1905. Due to differences in the electoral arithmetic this political constellation tailored for the situation in Baden differed significantly from those appropriate elsewhere. For Frank and his party colleagues, the biggest threat in the Baden Ständeversammlung came from the possibility of a parliamentary coalition between centrists and conservatives. To try and avert this possibility Social Democrats, Liberals and National Liberals came to an agreement concerning the second "run-off" round of voting in the 1905 election. The outcome was that Baden did indeed avoid an absolute Catholic-Conservative majority in the Ständeversammlung through the entire 1905-1909 parliamentary term.

An early prize from the strategy of political collaboration came with the election of the Social Democrat Adolf Geck as a vice-president of the parliament. It was the first time that a member of the "dangerously leftist" SPD had been elected to membership of the presidium to any of the regional parliaments in Germany. The Grand Duke Frederick died on 28 September 1907. He had been widely respected as an ally of political reformism. Kolb and Frank both took part in the funeral celebrations and were sharply criticised by elements in the Social Democratic press for doing so. There had been a current of persistent republican sentiment on the political left across Germany since 1871 which the presence in Berlin, since 1888, of a disconcertingly quixotic emperor had done nothing to dampen. In Karlsruhe Geck stayed away from the Grand Duke's funeral. That, in turn, drew criticism from the "bourgeois parties" in the Ständeversammlung who blocked Geck's re-election to the presidium of the chamber in 1907. Members elected Constantin Fehrenbach of the Catholic Centre Party to take over the empty vice-presidential seat.

In terms of practical progress, the strategy of political collaboration which Frank choreographed on behalf of SPD colleagues in the Ständeversammlung had its most important results in respect of school reforms and reforms to conditions of employment for government employees. There were two policy fields in respect of which the SPD successfully inserted several of its long-standing policy objectives into legislation. The pay of government employees was substantially increased. For Frank this was an obvious and necessary precursor to a more broadly based pay increase for public sector workers. On this basis he justified the support that the SPD group gave to the budget in the parliamentary vote on 2 August 1908.

==== 1909 - 1913 ====
Fresh elections to the second chamber of the Baden Ständeversammlung took place in the Autumn/Fall of 1909. In the first round of polling the SPD received 86,078 votes (1905: 50,431). The party was then able to improve its position further by renewing electoral pacts with other parties for the run-off polls. In the end there were 20 SPD members in the assembly. Only the Catholic Centre Party win more seats, with 26 (1905: 28). As the second-largest party in the chamber, the SPD increased its political influence, although the fragmented character of the overall result meant that cross-party support remained essential for any pieces of substantive legislation. The reason for the success of the SPD was in part down to national considerations. The 1909 election was held a few months after national financial reforms which had reduced support for the Catholic Centre Party and in Baden reduced the power of the political bloc/coalition of the centre-left that had dominated politics in the Grand Duchy between 1905 and 1909.

One of his colleagues, the SPD member from Mannheim, was elected to the presidium of the assembly, meaning that the party again had a representative in it. Edmund Rebmann took on the leadership of the National Liberal Party (NP) group in the Ständeversammlung. The NP was a broadly based party and Rebmann was a left-wing representative of it. During the parliamentary session between 1909 and 1913 he worked closely with Ludwig Frank. There were three themes that dominated the agenda for the SPD group in the second chamber of the Ständeversammlung: schools policy. income tax reform and the reform of the voting system used for local elections.

When it came to schools reform, Frank's demands included equal education opportunities for all citizens. He was unable to push through universal access to all the means of education, but was able to ensure that the obligation was placed on local authorities to provide school books for the children of impoverished parents. The obligation to undertake years of compulsory schooling was also extended to girls. All school large enough to employ more than ten teachers were now required to appoint a school doctor. A strengthening of citizens' participation in local school activities was achieved through the requirement to set up a schools commission of between four and twenty persons in all municipal and rural local authority areas.

The significant extra cost of the schools reforms and of increasing the pay of government employees led to a reform of income taxes. The SPD group in the Ständeversammlung supported the reforms because middle earners suffered only modest tax increases, and those with lower incomes were also spared the worst effects of the increases.

The Prussian-style stratified "Dreiklassenwahlrecht" (three-class voting system) was never adopted in Baden for elections to the Ständeversammlung (Landtag / Diet / Parliament), but it was used in local government elections As part of the broader reconfiguration of local government, the SPD group in the Ständeversammlung pushed for the abolition of what many saw as an anti-democratic anachronism, but without success. Nevertheless, the three classes into which the electorate was divided for local elections were re-sized, so that the weighting allocated to the votes of the lowest class (defined according to the level of tax paid) was increased significantly. In many instances this translated into increased representation for Social Democrats on town councils.

Despite these partial parliamentary successes, in July 1910 the SPD group in the chamber were not prepared to back the government in that year's important budget vote. It was only after the interior minister, Lord Heinrich von und zu Bodman of the National Liberals, had outlined a programme of positive collaboration with the SPD agenda on 13 July 1910 that Ludwig Frank felt able to recommend his parliamentary colleagues to relent. On 14 July 1910 the budget was passed with SPD support, which was provided in contravention of a resolution passed (nationally) at a recent party conference.

The parliamentary alliance in the Baden Ständeversammlung between the NP and the SPD proved particularly attractive to those on the left of the liberal movement. During 1910 Friedrich Naumann, an influential politician-philosopher of the liberal left, came out in favour of following the example of Baden in the Imperial Parliament in Berlin, to follow a political programme embracing Ernst Bassermann, August Bebel, and all those positioned at any point on the political spectrum between the two of them. At the same time the power to achieve social progress of the Liberal-Socialist alliance in Baden was by this time being progressively curbed: the anti-Social-Democratic strategies and policies coming out of Berlin also cast their shadow in the south-west of Germany. The Baden government responded to the national currents during the four or five years directly before the war by distancing itself from the SPD. One example was the way in which Gymnastics and Fitness clubs oriented towards Social Democracy found themselves disadvantaged as against those with a Catholic-Centrist orientation. That was the background to a decision by the SPD group in the Baden Ständeversammlung to vote against the government's budget in July 1912, a move that clearly attracted the sympathy of a number of members from NP members.

==== >1913 ====
Well before the 1913 elections for the second chamber of the Ständeversammlung, scheduled for August 1913, Frank and Rebmann, as leaders of their respective parties, met together and sounded out one another's positions over possible electoral alliances. It became clear that in Baden the liberals were taking their lead from the Reichstag in Berlin, where National Liberals and Social Democrats faced each other as opponents. Differences were exacerbated nationally by the government Defence Bill which passed its third reading in the Reichstag at the end of June 1913. The "bourgeois parties" backed the conservatives in respect of legislation that provided for a 21% increase in army manpower by 31 October 1915. The Social Democrats were resolute in their opposition to the measure. When the main election took place, on 21 October 1913, there was evidence of increased voter support for the conservatives and for the Catholic Centre Party, so that despite the underlying differences between them a number of hastily agreed run-off agreements for the second ballot came about. On this occasion, however, the momentum was against the SPD, and when the votes were counted it was the Liberals who had benefitted disproportionately from them. Although the Centre Party headed the list, with 30 members in the Badische Ständeversammlung, the Liberals were in second place with 20. The number of seats left to the SPD fell dramatically, from 20 in the previous session to 13. It was the first parliamentary election anywhere in Germany since the 1881 Reichstag election in which the absolute number of votes for the SPD actually fell back.

The "Großblock" centre-left alliance maintained its Baden Ständeversammlung majority due to a strong performance by the NP and despite the weak performance of the SPD, but the majority was now a very narrow one. The current in favour of reformist policies was much weakened. Many of the new NP members were aware that they had gained their seats as a result of run-off electoral alliances with candidates from the Centre Party who had stepped aside in the run-off poll. For its part, after 1913 the Baden government demonstrated an unconcealed propensity to marginalise the Social Democrat faction within the governing "Großblock" coalition. A particularly egregious example came in June 1914 when Bodman, Baden's Liberal Party Interior Minister between 1907 and 1918, shared his insight that Social Democrat reaching the end of their terms could never become "honorary local councillors" ("ehrenamtliche Bezirksräte") because they were outside the circle defined by "shared objectives" ("... an Gemeinsinn mangele"). Frank immediately attacked this attitude in the parliament as reactionary and took issue with the government over the unilateral and prejudicial assessment. It was in this context that on 26 June 1914 the SPD group in the Baden parliament voted aga8inst their government's budget for the state.

=== Controversies over budget approval ===
==== Disagreement at the 1908 Nuremberg SPD Party conference - background ====
Even before the Baden SPD group became part of a loose governing coalition, and thereby found itself expected to vote in favour of the government's draft budget proposals presented each June in the Baden Ständeversammlung, the party had already laid down firm guidelines to be followed at party conferences at Lübeck in 1901 and at Dresden in 1903. These were applicable across Germany, both in the national parliament and in the regional parliaments. The starting point was that SPD parliamentarians should not make it their business to vote in favour of budget proposals. An exception could be made only if the supporting a budget with SPD votes would avoid the threat of an alternative budget which would disadvantage workers even more. In 1907, however, SPD parliamentarians in the neighbouring Kingdom of Württemberg defied this guideline and voted in favour of a budget, the next year, in 1908, SPD parliamentarians in both the Bavarian Ständeversammlung and the Baden Ständeversammlung voted in favour of the annual budget proposals. In Bavaria SPD parliamentarians under the leadership of had already voted in support of a Bavarian budget as early as 1891.

==== Disagreement at the 1908 Nuremberg SPD Party conference - north: south divide ====
At the 1908 party conference held that year in Nuremberg, it became brutally apparent that party politics were far more polarised in the north of Germany - in Prussia and in Saxony - than in the predominantly catholic southern states. The conference dealt intensively with the question of parliamentary comrades voting in support of government budgets in the regional parliaments of the south. August Bebel, the party leader, delivered the key-note speech in which he demanded that the conference should vote on a resolution expressly denouncing the attitude of the south German comrades from Bavaria, Württemberg and Baden. Bebel made clear his judgement that by voting in support of regional government budgets the SPD parliamentarians in the south had shaken the credibility of the party's principles in the eyes of the working masses.

Directly after the party leader had delivered his speech, it was Ludwig Frank's turn to address the conference. He disagreed with Bebel. It was perfectly understandable thar SPD members from the German north would insist on strict rejection by SPD parliamentarians of government budget proposals, because the anti-democratic voting systems in northern Germany prevented Social Democrats from being fairly represented in the northern regional parliaments. Frank, in his speech, also referenced Ferdinand Lassalle, the socialist pioneer who had alarmed Prussian censors some decades earlier with his repeated assertions that moral primacy in society belonged in the first instance to the working class rather than the bourgeoisie. The founder of the General German Workers' Association had not seen the state as a "class state" but as an extant authority which might be open to improvements favouring workers in the here and now. A corresponding reform policy [accessible already, at least in southern Germany, through coalition politics], should not be held back by a doctrinaire blanket ban on local SPD parliamentarians voting in support of regional budgets. Karl Hildenbrand and Johannes Timm, delegates respectively from Württemberg and Bavaria, joined the debate, repeating what was effectively the same point. But the northern delegates were in the majority and a resolution was passed by and overwhelming 258 votes to 119 supporting the proposal from the party executive committee condemning the action of parliamentarians in the German south who had voted in support of their regional budgets. The matter was not settled however. 66 delegates representing Württemberg, Baden, Bavaria and Hessen joined to mandate the Bavarian delegate, Martin Segitz, to state that the delegates from the southern German states were prepared to recognise the position adopted by the party conference. Issues affecting budget decisions in the individual states would nevertheless be determined at the discretion of the SPD parliamentary groups and their regional parties.

==== Renewed disagreement at the 1910 Magdeburg SPD Party conference - background ====
During the first part of 1910 Karl Kautsky, one of the party's a self-appointed guardians of Marxist orthodoxy, used the pages of Die Neue Zeit, a somewhat cerebral journal founded by himself some years earlier, to launch a renewed attack on SPD parliamentarians in the Baden Ständeversammlung, who that year had again voted in support of the government's budget. For Kautsky this action was a breach of party discipline and a betrayal. Ludwig Frank used Die Neue Zeit for his rejoinder, insisting that the SPD parliamentarians had dealt with the budget vote in an entirely consistent manner. In Baden the SPD were part of the "Großblock" centre-left governing coalition, and they had accordingly helped to shape the budget. Under those circumstances it was critically important to take ownership of the budget by voting for it. Party members from the left-wing reacted by launching personal attacks against their comrades from Baden. Paul Lensch published his attack in Die Neue Zeit, describing the Baden parliamentarians as "cretins" and "petty bourgeois" - a favourite term of abuse among those inclined to view Marxism more as a latter day religion than as a means of improving the lives of workers. Some sources hint, in addition, at an element of antisemitism in the attacks on Frank to which the increasingly bitter dispute between party comrades gave rise.

==== Disagreement at the 1910 Magdeburg SPD Party conference - intensification ====
Those journalistic skirmishes proved to be no more than the first act in a renewed display of verbal savagery at the party conference, held that year at Magdeburg during September 1910. It was again August Bebel who instigated the resolution presented to the conference by the party executive. The actions of the Baden parliamentarians were condemned as "a major deliberate disregarding" of previous conference resolutions, an act which imperilled the very unity of the party. (Note: ". . . Der Parteitag erblickt deshalb in der Bewilligung des Budgets durch die Mehrheit der sozialdemokratischen Abgeordneten des badischen Landtages eine bewußt herbeigeführte grobe Mißachtung der wiederholt als Richtschnur für ihre parlamentarische Tätigkeit gefaßten Parteitagsbeschlüße und eine schwere Verfehlung gegen die Einheit der Partei . .. Der Parteitag spricht infolgedessen den sozialdemokratischen Abgeordneten, die im badischen Landtage das Budget bewilligt haben, die allerschärfste Mißbilligung aus . . ..") Presumably it was in full expectation of the conversation being widely reported that immediately before the conference opened August Bebel confided to comrades that Ludwig Frank, who had once been his "darling" and his "Benjamin" was a terrible disappointment.

In reacting to the resolution proposal, Frank deployed the arguments he had used two years earlier in replying to Kautsky. The Baden comrades had acted consistently. In passing, he added that it was not correct to read a Ständeversammlung vote in favour of the budget as any particular vote of confidence in the regional government in Karlsruhe under the leadership of Max von Baden. But the delegates at the Magdeburg conference were not to be persuaded. The resolution presented by the executive committee was passed with a large majority. There were those among the left-wing delegates who even saw Frank's appearance at the conference as a provocation in itself. He refused to rule out the possibility that SPD parliamentarians might again vote in support of a draft budget from the regional government at a future date. The left-wingers responded by introducing a resolution that would threaten party expulsions if SPD parliamentarians should again back a budget vote in the Ständeversammlung with their votes. This resolution also passed with a large majority. The possibility of a high-profile party scandal loomed as delegated from Württemberg, Baden and Bavaria discussed boycotting the rest of the party conference. It took a major effort by Ludwig Frank himself to dissuade them from this course of action. That he succeeded is a reflection of his powerful position among the delegates from the southern German states, who had sworn between themselves to present a united front at the Magdeburg congress before it had opened. There was no lasting party split, but the events at the Magdeburg party conference, but fundamental differences over the possibilities and obligations affecting social democratic parliamentary work had been very publicly ventilated.

For his part, Ludwig Frank evidently felt that time was on his side. He made it clear that any decision about the future voting strategy of the SPD group in the Baden Ständeversammlung would depend on how future political constellations would play out there. He also thought it entirely that delegates from the north who most shrilly protested the approach of parliamentarian comrades in the southern states might, in a few years' time, find themselves voting to support regional budgets should they, with or without a more equitable system for allocating seats according to the votes of the electorate, find themselves in a "Großblock" governing coalition themselves. For Ludwig Frank the issue of voting for regional budgets in parliament was never a matter of high principle, but simply a question of political tactics.

=== German Reichstag (parliament) in Berlin ===
==== Justice policy and Foreign affairs ====
Before 1914 the Social Democratic Party group in the Imperial Parliament (Reichstag) found itself shunned or at best marginalised by members representing the parties traditionally regarded as mainstream. In the 1907 General Election the SPD gained 29%% of the votes cast but, due principally to the uneven size of the electoral districts, only 43 seats in the chamber. Those 43 seats represented approximately 11% of the total number of seats which was 397. One of the 43 seats was won by Ludwig Frank, representing the Mannheim-Weinheim electoral district. During his seven years as a member of parliament Ludwig Frank nevertheless won increasing respect and influence. Scope for exercising his ability for hands-on political control remained limited, since at the level of the national parliament there was never any question, before 1918, of the SPD becoming involved in any government coalition. One area in respect of which he was, exceptionally, able to engage at a detailed level was the pressing matter of constitutional reform, which had featured as part of the political agenda ever since the Bismarck years. Another linked issue, for which his legal mindset was particularly well suited involved formulating an electoral law for the still far from integrated Imperial Territory of Alsace–Lorraine.

Almost immediately following his election to the Reichstag in 1907 Frank was appointed as the SPD spokesman on Justice Policy. On several occasions he participated in parliamentary debates in order to call for judicial reforms. He liked to point out that the increasing among of work undertaken by Workers' Secretariats (legal advice centres for workers) provided powerful evidence that even members of the working class had valuable legal abilities. He also drew attention on various occasions to the highly restricted level of control that the Reichstag exercised over government. He criticised examples of "class-based" justice in Germany and was also, in particular, witheringly critical of government attempts to force journalists to disclose their sources. He also used his interventions in the chamber to draw attention to the damage done to the political interests of workers in Prussia of the three-class voting system). On this theme Frank was in particularly close harmony with party comrades inside and beyond the Reichstag. The SPD had been calling for reforms to make the Prussian voting system more equal for many years.

From time to time Frank also spoke out on foreign policy matters. He used the 1911 Morocco Crisis to denounce again the circumscribed political power of the parliament. In France the national parliament was permitted to decide on foreign treaties and agreements: its German counterpart was not. He also demanded, on behalf of the Social Democrat group in the Reichstag, that an inter-governmental understanding with France and Britain should be set up, in view of the 1911 crisis, and in order to ensure that any future such international crisis would not spill over into something even more serious. A series of Social Democratic peace demonstrations on the city streets in Germany at this time illustrated the widespread popular desire for a peaceful understanding between Germany and neighbouring states.

==== Budget speeches ====
Plenary debates on the annual budget proposals were among the most important responsibilities of the parliament, even under the empire. In 1912 Ludwig Frank was given the opportunity to lead for the SPD in the Reichstag budget debates. In his contributions Frank kept away from empty phrases conjuring up images of some future revolution, but he did spell out some necessary reforms. His wide-ranging speech on 15 February 1912 returned to the need for reform of the existing constituency boundaries which still disproportionately reduced the power of the votes from working class electors in the densely populated urban districts. He highlighted gaps in the framework of social welfare legislation inherited from Chancellor Bismarck, especially with regard to social insurance. Here he called for a reduction in the age threshold for receiving state pensions, and he also called for the introduction of a national system of unemployment insurance. Turing to the taxation system, he urged reductions in indirect taxation (on expenditure) and compensating increases in direct taxation (on income).

In an early contribution on the 1913 budget, Frank addressed the Reichstag on 4 December 1912. He emphasized the cultural and organisational accomplishments of the workers and called for improvements in legislative and financial protection and support for them.

==== Political reforms in Alsace-Lorraine ====
Most of the Imperial Territory of Alsace–Lorraine had been part of France between 1679 and 1871, and during the subsequent four decades had in many ways remained a semi-detached part of Germany. There was a perceived need, following unification, for the whole of Germany to move away from its federal structure, towards a centralised model closer to the system that seemed to have served France and Britain well for centuries, and with an arms-race across Europe gathering pace during the first decade of the twentieth century, tighter control was becoming a strategic priority. In 1911 the government's submission to the Reichstag of a draft constitution and electoral law provided a rare opportunity for the SPD parliamentary group to contribute to shaping elements of Germany's future constitutional structure.

From 1911 the Imperial Territory of Alsace–Lorraine sent representatives to the Bundesrat (the upper house of the German parliament) like all the kingdoms, duchies, principalities and free cites in the German Empire. It also acquired its own bicameral regional parliament ("Landtag des Reichslandes Elsaß-Lothringen"), the lower house of which was an assembly of directly elected members. The Imperial Territory of Alsace–Lorraine constitutional reform initiatives which led to the 1911 legislation originated in Berlin at the Reichstag. Ludwig Frank was a member of the 28 member parliamentary commission which scrutinised intensively the associated government proposals. Although the new law stopped short of turning Alsace–Lorraine into "just another federal German state", and although the emperor continued to appoint a "Statthalter" (regional governor) and member of the first chamber of the regional "Landtag", Ludwig Frank regarded the new constitutional settlement for Alsace–Lorraine as a decisive advance, especially with regard to the elective nature of the second "Landtag" chamber. He hoped that the new electoral law for Alsace–Lorraine would give a boost to demands for replacement of the stratified voting system in Prussia itself. Within the SPD group in the Reichstag Ludwig Frank - regarded by many as the most gifted of the country's SPD politicians in this period - was able to organise backing among his sometimes fractious colleagues for the 1911 constitution and electoral law, formally at a party plenary session on 26 May 1911.

Frank himself died four years before the three-class franchise was eliminated as part of a wide-ranging series of constitutional reforms that became politically unavoidable after the Emperor's abdication in 1918 opened the way for a republican government structure that would have been unthinkable in 1911. Frank and others who thought like him were disappointed that the new constitutional arrangements for Alsace–Lorraine failed to ignite moves for wider constitutional reform across Germany between 1911 and 1914. Instead the Zabern Affair in 1913 suggested that, from the perspective of the emperor and his relentlessly ever more conservative government, Alsace-Lorraine enjoyed the status only of a privileged colony, and wider constitutional progress was off the agenda. In the Reichstag there was protest and a surge in mistrust of the chancellor, following a realisation that the Prussian army units in Zabern/Saverne had been guilty of foolish over-reaction and gross lawlessness, and that the German government had felt unable to assert its authority over the military. But Theobald von Bethmann Hollweg retained the confidence of the emperor, and therefore his job.

==== Army bill controversy 1913 ====
After the budget for 1913 had been approved, at the end of March 1913 the Bethmann Hollweg government presented the Reichstag with an Army Bill. The bill included a proposal to increase the number of full army officers by 3,900, the number of junior officers by 15,000 and the number of "simple soldiers" by 117,000. The Social Democrats were uncompromising in their rejection of this plan. On 9 April 1913 Ludwig Frank addressed the chamber on behalf of the party, opposing the Army Bill and calling on members to get together with their colleagues in the French parliament ("Chambre des députés") in order to find a way out of the spiralling arms race. In the Reichstag the government secured a majority in support of the Army Bill.

The government had succeeded in winning the parliamentary vote on the Army Bill without any mention or discussion of how the army expansion in question might be financed. With the critical vote secured, however, the funding issue could no longer be sidestepped, and the government produced a proposal to finance the army expansion by levying taxes on property. Social Democrats had, over many years, been calling for a switch away from indirect taxes (on spending) in favour of increased direct taxes (on income and wealth). It was believed, on the political left, that such a switch would make the German taxation system more socially fair. The position taken by the party in the Reichstag was savagely attacked at the Party Conference held at Jena in 1913 by comrades from the party's left-wing, because the idea had been presented by the government only as a device to fund military expansion. Frank nevertheless successfully defended the position taken by the parliamentary party in support of the property tax, and won a vote of conference delegates approving it.

=== The Prussian three-class voting law and the appeal for a political mass strike ===
The Prussian three-class voting system ("Dreiklassenwahlrecht") had long been disparaged by progressive commentators. It divided voters into three classes ranked in order by the amount of tax each voter paid, with total tax payments and the number of electors chosen the same in each class. The class containing those who paid the highest taxes had the fewest voters, and the class containing those who paid the least in taxes the most. This meant that a rich voter carried far more voting weight in elections than a poor voter. It was the poor voters who were most likely to vote for the Social Democrats (SPD). The journalist-historian Rolf Gustav Haebler (who grew up not in Prussia but in Baden) described the three-class voting system as "the best bulwark of Prussian reaction". It enabled conservative traditionalist élites to dominate politics in Prussia, which was by far the largest state in imperial Germany. Rapid industrialisation during the second half of the nineteenth century brought massive increases in population and of sheer wealth, along with major population shifts, all of which intensified popular pressure for reform of Prussia's quasi-feudal voting arrangements. On 11 January 1910 the Emperor announced a reform. However, the practical impact of the reform proposed would have been very modest. On the streets of Germany's booming cities the reform proposals triggered a series of demonstrations by protestors demanding the abolition of the three-class voting system. Ludwig Frank, addressing the Reichstag on 19 February 1910, backed the street demonstrations, highlighting both the determination of the demonstrators and the resolutely peaceful character of the street campaigners.

With the effects of the Prussian three-class system subjected to increased scrutiny after 1912, Social Democrats noted that a succession of state-level and municipal elections the SPD was repeatedly disadvantaged by application of the voting system, receiving far fewer seats than would have resulted from a simple apportionment based on overall vote share. The impact of this democratic under-representation was repeatedly highlighted by decisions taken in state-level parliaments and municipal councils by decisions that contradicted SPD principles and policies and which, in the eyes of SPD leaders and other progressive elements in the liberal class, disadvantaged working class voters. This was reflected in an intensification of pressure to campaign effectively for a more democratic voting system on those reformist parliamentary representatives who had managed to jump through the necessary hoops to win a parliamentary voice. Nevertheless, during 1913 (and indeed till 1918), all attempts to achieve meaningful electoral reform failed.

Elections to the Prussian House of Representatives, held on 16 May 1913, highlighted problems caused by the Prussian three-class voting system with particular force. Turnout was just 32.7%. A year earlier turnout across Germany in the 1912 General Election had been 84.5%. The size of the difference could not be imputed solely to the higher level of interest generated by national elections than by state-level elections. Many of those entitled to vote in the 1913 Prussian state election were reported to have stayed away because voting was public: there was no secret ballot. Others made clear their conviction that the distortions created by the three-class voting system simply made voting a pointless exercise. On 12 June 1913 Ludwig Frank addressed a public meeting at Berlin-Wilmersdorf: he called for a general strike, which he saw as the only way to compel the necessary democratisation of the voting system in Germany's largest "state". In his speech Frank referenced previous strikes in other countries, such as the "Chartist strikes" in the north of England during the 1840s, General strikes in Belgium in 1893, 1902 and 1912 which (eventually) led to universal suffrage, a general strike in Sweden in 1903 and in Italy in 1904. He also highlighted the mass strikes of 1905 in the Russian empire, seen at the time as a core element in the 1905 revolution which had forced the creation of the Russian Constitution of 1906. Frank's advocacy of a mass strike to force an end to the Prussian three-class franchise was particularly remarkable because it came from a member of the party leadership in the Reichstag who was widely presumed to be representative of the SPD mainstream. Less remarkable was the derision that his call immediately earned him from party comrades on the left wing of the party. At the very same meeting at Wilmersdorf he came under attack from Rosa Luxemburg, who identified an incompatibility between Frank's willingness to co-operate in a government structure based on what she termed "bloc parties" in his home state of Baden (where, to be fair, the three-class franchise did not apply) and his advocacy of a mass strike to force a change in the voting system in Prussia. (Luxemburg had already reached the conclusion that there was no possibility of implementing socialist reforms in an imperialist class-bound state.) Frank's retort was that he had never represented a "Politik der Phrase", but always a "Politik der Tat" - in effect, he was content to be judged by his actions and not simply by empty rhetoric. Frank's proposal to force the dismantling of the Prussian three-class franchise using mass strikes certainly generated much intense debate within the party: those who assumed that he presented the idea on behalf of the parliamentary party, or even that it reflected the mood of a majority within the wider labour movement during the years before the First World War, were probably incorrect, however.

The Free Trade Unions ("Freie Gewerkschaften") had always rejected the idea of mass strikes as a political tool. At the Jena Party Conference in 1913 it became clear that they were not about to change their position simply because the call for mass strikes came from Ludwig Frank, seen by many as a member of the party's reformist wing. Gustav Bauer, deputy president of the General Trades Union Commission (umbrella body), rejected Frank's proposal. For most of Frank's labour movement activist comrades, Prussia's voting system was, at most, a second tier issue. In turning down Ludwig Frank's general strike recommendation Bauer followed the familiar party line: the party and the trades unions affiliated to it should focus on organisational consolidation. It was a view to which most of the delegates present were happy to be persuaded: the motion supporting Frank's advocacy of a mass strike was rejected by 333 votes to 142. Keen to demonstrate the party's respectability to the political power brokers of Wilhelmine Germany, comrade-delegates were keen to avoid allowing opponents to depict them as a bunch of dangerous revolutionaries. Frank could only bemoan what looked, to him, like a lamentable absence of political backbone. It was not the only respect in which, at the Jena Party Conference, he found himself seriously out of line with the party mainstream. As a self-declared backer of political alliances with reformist elements in the "bourgeois parties" over issues on which objectives were aligned, as the leader of South German reformism, Frank found that his attempts to rally the party behind a policy of mass strikes to force electoral reform in the German north served only to emphasize the extent to which, at a national level, by 1913 he had become politically isolated within his own party.

=== Attempting to create Franco-German rapprochement ===
==== Bern Conference for agreement and understanding 1913 ====
In both France and Germany, the domestic political agenda was driven by complementary foreign policy imperatives. A largely unspoken assumption was in place that another war was approaching. In Germany the government was preoccupied with expanding the army, while politics in France were dominated by government determination to expand conscription, which was to be linked to a three years military service obligation.

Ludwig Frank pressed the need for urgent action in response to the intensifying danger of war. On 26 March 1913 he sent a letter to his old friend Emil Hauth, who by this time had moved on from his life as a school teacher and lodging house keeper in Lahr and become a journalist, working in Zürich on the Social Democratic daily newspaper "Volksblatt". Frank asked his friend to enquire among Swiss comrades whether it would be possible to organise a conference of like-minded German and French parliamentarians in Switzerland - possibly another in Belgium - to signal their shared opposition to the surging tide of Franco-German re-armament. Politicians from other political parties should also be invited. Frank hoped that the conference he had in mind would become more than a way to highlight growing threat from war: it could also be the prelude to a sustained improvement in Franco-German relations. Frank's approach met with a positive response. Swiss socialist grabbed the idea, which Ludwig Frank had also shared with others who might be supportive, including Robert Grimm, the Bern-based journalist-politicians widely seen as the leading Swiss socialist of his generation. Grimm succeeded in inviting 13 members of the Swiss national parliament, between them representing all the political parties represented in the Swiss parliament, to attend a "Conference of Mutual Understanding" ("Verständigungskonferenz") to be held in Bern on 11/12 May 1913. For his part Frank managed to persuade August Bebel, the aging leader of the German Social Democrats, who had initially opposed the whole idea of any cross-party conference, not just to attend the conference, but also to speak at it.

In the end 26 Social Democrats attended. Only a few of the other parties with a presence in the German Reichstag were represented at the Bern Conference. There were five members of the social-liberal Progressive People's Party, along with one representative of the Danish-speaking minority in Schleswig-Holstein and two from Alsace. The delegation from France was much larger. Of the 180 French delegates, there were 100 representing the traditional so-called "bourgeois parties". The French parliamentary group was led by Paul Henri Balluet d'Estournelles de Constant, already a Nobel Peace Prize winner, and the French socialist leader, Jean Jaurès (who would be assassinated, apparently on account of his known antimilitarism, a year later). The conference called for an understanding between the Germans and the French, and insisted on the primacy of diplomacy and, in extremis, of the Hague Arbitration Court as devices for conflict resolution. In addition, a standing committee under the leadership of d'Estournelles and Hugo Haase was created and mandated to prepare further meetings of the group.

Frank greeted the Bern Conference euphorically. He saw it as the start of an about-turn in the relationship between France and Germany. The extent of his confidence implies a curiously one-sided judgement of the event, however. He ignored the absence of parliamentarians from most of the German mainstream political parties: there was no reason to believe that the Franco-German arms race was about to be reversed by parliamentary means.

==== Parliamentarians' meeting in Basel 1914 ====
The standing committee created in 1913 convened a further meeting which was held in Basel on 30 May 1914, albeit on a smaller scale than the meeting of the previous year. Sixteen parliamentarians attended from France and eighteen from Germany. Seven of the German delegates were from the SPD. There were four from the FVP, three Catholic Centrists, two from the NP and two from the still semi-detached territory of Alsace. The importance of arbitration as a device for resolving international differences was again stressed. The conference also proposed that two inter-parliamentary assemblies should be organised simultaneously, one to take place in Germany and the other in France. German and French parliamentarians should meet together on both the left and the right banks of the Rhine in order to demonstrate and emphasize their willingness to reach understandings together. In the summer of 1914, during the aftermath of the Bael conference Ludwig Frank on a number of occasions again expressed his own extreme confidence as to the outlook for Franco-German relations. A few weeks later France and Germany were at war. The arms race could not be stopped and the war fever on the streets of both countries could not be stilled. In France there was still a hunger for revenge following the loss in May 1871 of Alsace-Lorraine: in Germany the neighbour beyond the Rhine had been the hereditary enemy since at least as far back as 1648.

=== War ===
During the July Crisis, directly before war was declared, the Labour movement organised peace rallies across Europe. In Germany Social Democrats took a lead in calling for the preservation of peace. In Mannheim Frank addressed a peace rally at the end of June 1914. He still felt able to express the hope that despite the obvious dangers, there would be no major war. Tellingly, however, he added that of such a war could not be stopped, then he was confident that patriotic workers would fulfil their "duty to the nation" and get stuck into the war for the sake of Germany.

By 1914 Germany's top generals and their emperor were convinced that war with Russia was inevitable. There was also a conviction within the military establishment that - notwithstanding Russia's international network of quasi-alliances involving Britain and France - war was still winnable, whereas if Russia were to be given another few years to modernize and expand its military capabilities further, Russian expansion across the western half of Europe would become unstoppable. The assessment was one that Chancellor von Bethmann Hollweg, a cautious conservative instinctively loyal to the emperor who had appointed him, probably accepted, despite evidence of his personal reservations, at least with regard to anticipated future timelines. By portraying the Russian empire as the true aggressor in the event of any future war, the government were able to win the hearts of many instinctive socialist supporters who had long regarded imperial Russia as a bastion of Tsarist reactionism, and thereby a constant threat to progressive political developments in the west. According to the Gregorian (western) calendar, the Assassination of Archduke Franz Ferdinand in Sarajevo took place on 28 June 1914. (Note: The Russian empire still used the Julian calendar at this time, meaning that while western sources generally assert that the First World War broke out at the end of July 1914, Russian sources and literature report that the war broke out in August 1914.) After failing to obtain assurances sought from the Serbian government, Austria declared war on Serbia on 28 July 1914. (The Serbian army had already been mobilised in anticipation of war.) Russia ordered a partial mobilisation on 25 July and a general mobilisation in support of its Serbian ally on 30 July 1914. The German declaration of war in support of Germany's Austrian ally followed on 1 August 1914. In the Reichstag the Social Democratic group were persuaded to accept what amounted to a parliamentary truce on war funding on 4 August 1914 because, according to sources, they were persuaded that a defensive war against, primarily, Russian imperialism, had been justified. Ludwig Frank took a lead in persuading parliamentary colleagues to view matters in these terms. On 2 August 1914, faced with the strong possibility of a party split in the Reichstag, he wrote to his friend and close Reichstag ally, Wilhelm Kolb:

"Tomorrow I will travel to Berlin. On Tuesday the Reichstag comes together. In all the circumstance I will try to get the [parliamentary Social Democratic] group to vote in support of war funding measures. In extremis, simply the members from Southern Germany!". (Note: "Ich reise morgen nach Berlin ab. Am Dienstag tritt der Reichstag zusammen. Ich werde unter allen Umständen durchzusetzen suchen, daß die Fraktion für die Kriegskredite stimmt. Im Notfall die Süddeutschen allein!")

At the start of August 1914 Frank gathered together group of SPD Reichstag members who thought as he did. They were prepared to vote in support of funding for the war even if the majority of the Social Democratic group in the parliament abstained or voted in opposition to the motion. Frank believed it was vital to prove the absolute dependability of the SPD nationally. He hoped, like many leading Social Democrats, that in return for this demonstration of loyalty to the fatherland for a greatly enhanced democratisation of Germany.

Without resigning his Reichstag seat, Frank volunteered for military service. In this way he sought to back up his parliamentary vote with a public act of personal commitment. As a member of the "Landsturm", which amounted to a form of reserve militia and national parliamentarian, he had little reason to expect to be sent to the frontline immediately. Ludwig Frank, who just weeks before had campaigned for peace and mutual understanding between nations, now threw himself into the national pro-war frenzy of the moment. In his letters he wrote that he was looking forward to the war. But he was very conscious of strategic political opportunities. He believed firmly in German victory and in the scope for constitutional transformation that this would deliver. War was the lever which could finally provide deliverance from the political stagnation at Germany's heart. "Internationalism has for a long time been held back by the reality of a nationally focused labour movement. Instead of a general strike we are now conducting a war for [reform of the] Prussian voting system".

Frank received but failed to listen to warnings that by volunteering for frontline army service he was endangering his life. He was called up on 13 August 1914. In a letter dated 23 August 1914, he wrote ruefully:

"... I do not know if the French artillery will also respect my parliamentary immunity. I have a burning wish to survive the war and then join in with the rebuilding from within of the German state. But for now the only possible place for me is in the front line with the rank and file". (Note: "Ich stehe an der Front wie jeder andere, ich werde von allen (Mannschaften wie Offizieren) mit größter Rücksicht (protzig ausgedrückt: Ehrerbietung!) behandelt. Aber ich weiß nicht, ob auch die französischen Kugeln meine parlamentarische Immunität achten. Ich habe den sehnlichen Wunsch, den Krieg zu überleben und dann am Innenausbau des Reiches mitzuschaffen. Aber jetzt ist für mich der einzig mögliche Platz in der Linie in Reih und Glied.)

(Frank's letter was subsequently published as part of a public legacy or tribute in the Israelitisches Familienblatt, a Hamburg-based weekly newspaper intended, primarily, for Jewish readers without regard for any religious proclivities they might or might not harbour.)

The Social Democratic newspaper in Mannheim reported a storm of ovations that crowds of supporters gave Frank to mark his actual departure for the frontline on 31 August 1914. Three days later, on 3 September 1914, the forty year old was killed during a skirmish with the French military while serving as a foot soldier member of the "Kaiser Wilhelm I" Baden Grenadier Regiment no. 110 by the hamlet of Nossoncourt (Baccarat).

Only two serving members of the German Parliament (Reichstag) were killed on the Front line during the First World War. Ludwig Frank was the first. The other was Hans von Meding (1868–1917) of the conservative-federalist German-Hanoverian Party, killed by the Lielupe River south of Riga at the start of 1917.

== Commemoration and celebration ==
- In 1914 the popular poet-author Ludwig Thoma published "Flügelmann Frank", an eighteen line three stanza poem on the death of Ludwig Frank.
- In 1924 Hedwig Wachenheim, who had experienced a brief but intensive friendship with Ludwig Frank during (and possibly after) 1912, edited and published "Dem Andenken Ludwig Franks gefallen in Lothringen am 3. September 1914", a compilation of Frank's speeches, essays and letters. She included a lengthy introduction of her own, setting out what she saw as Frank's essential political philosophy and objectives. She is unreservedly supportive of her dead former friend.
- During subsequent decades Frank was commemorated through a succession of little memorialisation pieces, frequently published on an anniversary of his birth or of his death, sometimes accompanied by one of his own speeches. In September 1964 Carlo Schmidt delivered a speech to mark the fiftieth anniversary of his death, asserting that the history of regional politics in Baden of national politics in Germany, and the history of Social Democracy, becomes unthinkable, without the contribution of Ludwig Frank. So many of the ideas that later generations were able to make real had already been conceptualised and powerfully advocated by Ludwig Frank before 1914.
- President Heuss, who had been a friend, referenced Ludwig Frank in his memoires. and in several other works that he produced during his later years. With the death in 1914 of Ludwig Frank, Heuss wrote that Germany had lost one of its strongest and most necessary future leaders.
- In 1995 Karl Otto Watzinger produced a major study of Ludwig Frank. It set out the state of knowledge about Frank as a politician at the time, through a careful study both of the material already published, and of a number of previously unpublished sources.
- In Mannheim Ludwig Frank became something of a cult icon with members of Reichsbanner Schwarz-Rot-Gold, a political organisation named after the flag of the German republic and dedicated to defending German democracy against subversion from within and, from without, the extremism represented by the populist "right" and their Moscow inspired counterparts of the "left". In September 1924 Reichsbanner supporters had a memorial statue to Frank erected in Mannheim's Luisenpark. The statue quickly became the focus for political gatherings. Reichsbanner supporters found themselves having to organise protection for it because of concerns about the possibility of desecration by nationalist-populists. In May 1925 the monument was desecrated with a large quantity of red printers' ink and a few days later, after that had been removed, a large black swastika was drawn across it. However, in January 1933 the Hitler government took power and quickly transformed Germany into a one- party dictatorship. The Reichsbanner organisation was soon outlawed. In June 1933 the Ludwig Frank memorial in the park was destroyed by or on behalf of the authorities. In 1950 the generic figure of a youth "as a memorial for Ludwig Frank and the dead of the First World War" was placed where the 1924 Ludwig Frank memorial had stood. It successfully recalled many of Frank's achievements and something of his spirit.

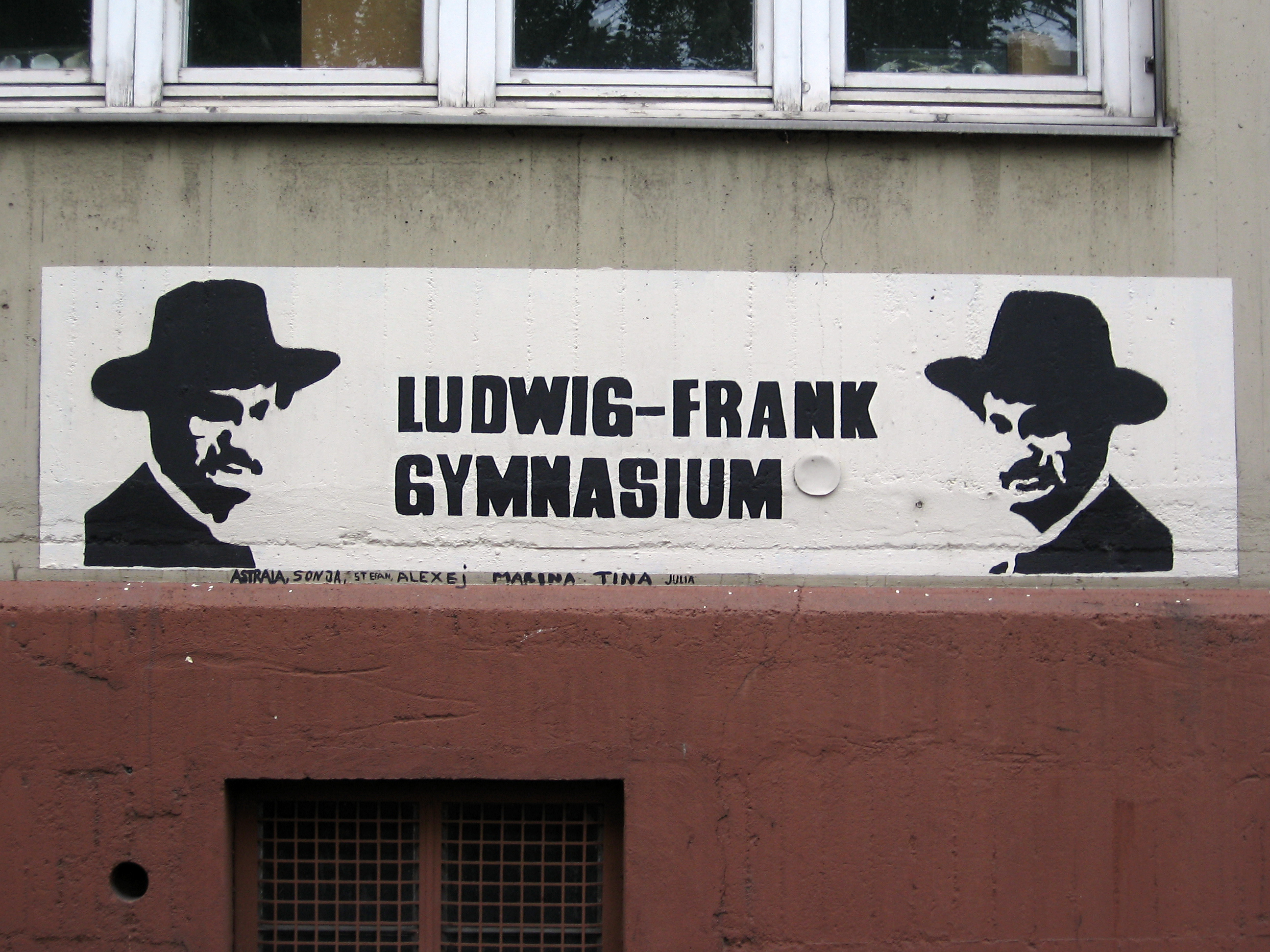
In Mannheim there are a number of public institutions named pr renamed to commemorate and/or celebrate Ludwig Frank, including at least one street, one kindergarten, one Housing cooperative and the Ludwig Frank Gymnasium (secondary school) pictured here.

- In April 1972 a number of members of the West German army got together to form the so-called "Ludwig Frank committee". There were 37 of them, and they came from a complete cross-section of all the ranks, topped off with a three-star general. They submitted to Georg Leber, the Minister for Defence, a request that the army should name a barracks complex after Ludwig Frank. Despite the reportedly unprecedented circumstances, the request was agreed, and on 22 May 1974 the former "Liège barracks" in Mannheim were renamed as the "Ludwig Frank barracks". At the renaming ceremony held on 24 May, which was one day after the centenary of Ludwig Frank's birth, an inauguration address was delivered by Karl Wilhelm Berkhan, the Minister's charismatic deputy. In 1995 the "Ludwig Frank barracks" were closed down as part of the Glasnost dividend. The building still stands, but it has been transformed, becoming the "Ludwig Frank Student Hall of Residence". Monthly rents range from €240,00 for one of the 502 single rooms in a shared apartment to €435,00 for the parent-child apartment.
- Towns and cities with a Ludwig-Frank-Straße (Ludwig Frank Street) include Nuremberg, Lahr, Salzwedel, and Mannheim. A number of schools, along with other institutions and pieces of infrastructure associated with public benefit also bear his name, including the local primary school in Schwanau-Nonnenweier, the village of his birth.
