= Sklarek scandal =

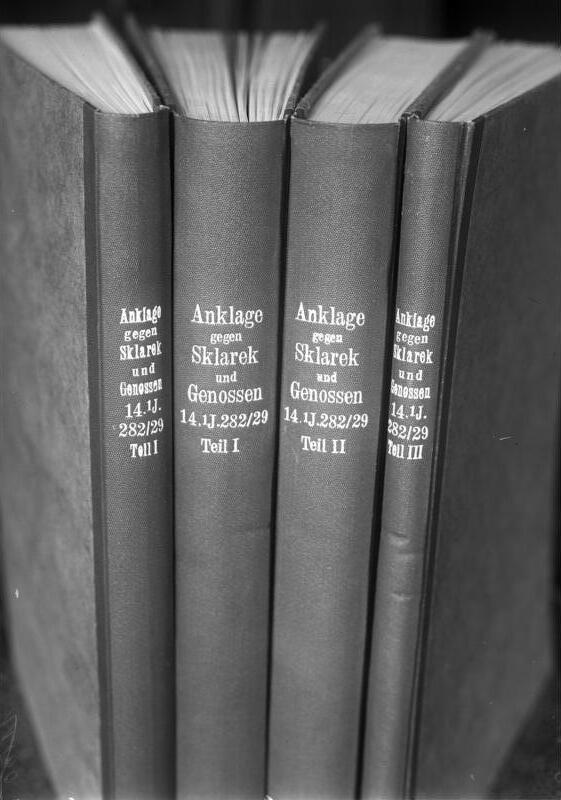
Multi-volume indictment of the Sklaren court case

The Sklarek scandal was a political scandal which started in 1927 in Weimar Germany. It primarily involved three brothers, Leo, Max and Willy Sklarek who were arrested for fraud in the autumn of that year coming to trial on 13 October 1931. As with the previous Barmat scandal, the brothers were Jewish, a fact which was likewise exploited by propagandists of the emergent Nazi Party, who used the scandal to attack Jewish people in general, democracy and the Weimar state.

In 1926, the Sklarek brothers bought the stock of the clothing distribution company, with which the municipality of Berlin dressed its agents during the First World War. This relationship was continued in the postwar years. However, the brothers defrauded the Berlin municipality by issuing a series of false invoices for goods never delivered. When the fraud was discovered, the damages were estimated at over 10 million marks. The brothers bribed or attempted to bribe a large number of Weimer officials to cover up the scandal. The corruption was so widespread that the court proceedings ran to 2300 pages.

The press of all political directions quickly took up the case. Max Sklarek was a member of the German Democratic Party (DDP) and had connections to Gustav Boess. Leo and Willi Sklarek had been members of the SPD since 1928, which formed the largest parliamentary group in the city council. Donations to the German National People's Party (DNVP) and the communist Red Aid were soon made known.

As the scandal broadened, the Prussian state parliament decided on October 17, 1929 to set up a parliamentary "committee of inquiry to clarify the mismanagement in the Berlin city administration", the first of its kind.

In the election campaign leading up to the local elections on November 17, 1929, the parties accused each other of being involved in the scandal. The beneficiaries of these disputes were the KPD and the NSDAP, which each gained 13 seats in the city council. Although communists and social democrats still had a majority in Berlin's city parliament, their willingness to work together suffered lasting damage from conflicts during the Sklarek scandal.

The trial against those involved dragged on until 1932 and ended with the Sklarek brothers being sentenced to four years in prison each. Numerous politicians and administrative officials also resigned, were dismissed from service or convicted.

In 1933 the National Socialists brought up the Sklarek case again for themselves when the trial was resumed. Among other things, Lord Mayor Gustav Böß was investigated again, but he was released after nine months of pre-trial detention without starting a trial.

Willi Sklarek died in Prague on March 18, 1938, Leo Sklarek was shot in the Sachsenhausen concentration camp on May 22, 1942, and Max Sklarek was murdered in the Auschwitz concentration camp on September 30, 1944.
