= Hedwig Wachenheim =

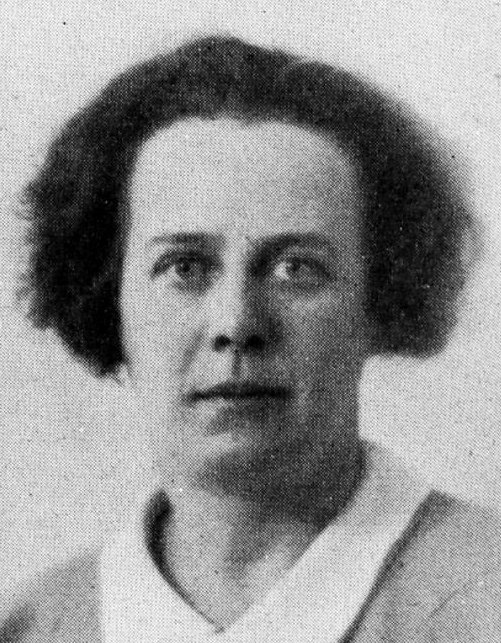
- Wachenheim c. 1932
- Born: August 27, 1891; Mannheim
- Died: October 8, 1969 (aged 78); Hanover
- Occupation: Politicians
- Notable work: Cofounding Arbeiterwohlfahrt

Hedwig Wachenheim (August 27, 1891 in Mannheim – October 8, 1969 in Hanover) was a German Social Democratic politician and historian.

== Early life ==
Wachenheim came from a long-established Mannheim family whose reference can be found in old documents before 1700. In 1816, her great-grandfather owned a house in the Lower Town, a district where traditional Jewish wholesalers lived. The grandparents ran a textile shop there until 1880. In 1880 they gave up the business, grandfather became a wine merchant and relocated to the center of town. Her mother came from a wealthy Baden family. Hedwig's father, banker and chairman of the Freedom Association and city councilor, died when she was seven years old. Wachenheim grew up in upper middle-class, affluent circumstances in which it was unusual for women of her state were working or lower ran housework themselves. When Wachenheim decided to become a welfare worker against her mother's wishes, it caused a stressed relationship between her and her family.

Wachenheim went to Berlin and studied at the Alice Salomon University from 1912 to 1914 . From 1914 to 1915 she worked as a welfare worker in Mannheim and returned to Berlin in 1915. There she worked from 1916 to 1917 as an employee in the commission of the National Women's Service in Berlin and from 1917 to 1919 as head of a complaints office in the Berlin milk supply. From 1919 to 1922 she worked in the Federal Agency for Political Education and from 1922 to 1933 as an employee and later as a member of the government.

== Workers' welfare and Arbeiterwohlfahrt ==
In 1919 she co-founded the Arbeiterwohlfahrt and she started to act as a member of the main committee. From 1926 she was editor of the journal Arbeiterwohlfahrt and from 1928, she worked as the director of the welfare school of the Arbeiterwohlfahrt.

== Social Democratic Policy and Emigration ==
After embarking on an intensive friendship with the Reichstag member Ludwig Frank, whom she had met in 1912, Wachenheim joined the SPD in 1914. After a short time as a member of the Berlin SPD-USPD magistrate in 1919 and she became a Berlin city councilor and in 1928 she entered the Landtag of Prussia where she served until 1933. After emigrating for political reasons, she became involved in the exile organization of German social democrats, the German Labor Delegation, in the US from 1935. As part of this work, she particularly advocated the entry of people persecuted by the National Socialists.

After the National Socialist seizure of power in 1933, she had lost her mandate in the state parliament and her position as a member of the government. It was not hidden from her that many of her friends experienced dire fates for political reasons. Hedwig Wachenheim decided to emigrate. The way they led first to France where she lectures at the Sorbonne occupied and in 1935 to England, where she lectures London School of Economics visited.

In 1935 she emigrated to the United States. In 1938, she acquired US citizenship. In 1946, she returned to Germany and worked until 1949 as an employee of the welfare department of the US military government in Stuttgart and until 1951 as an employee of the welfare department of the US High Commissioner in Frankfurt. She then returned to the United States again and worked on a scholarship from the University of California. There she carried out Berkeleyat, her main scientific work on the German labor movement until 1914, and it was published in 1967.

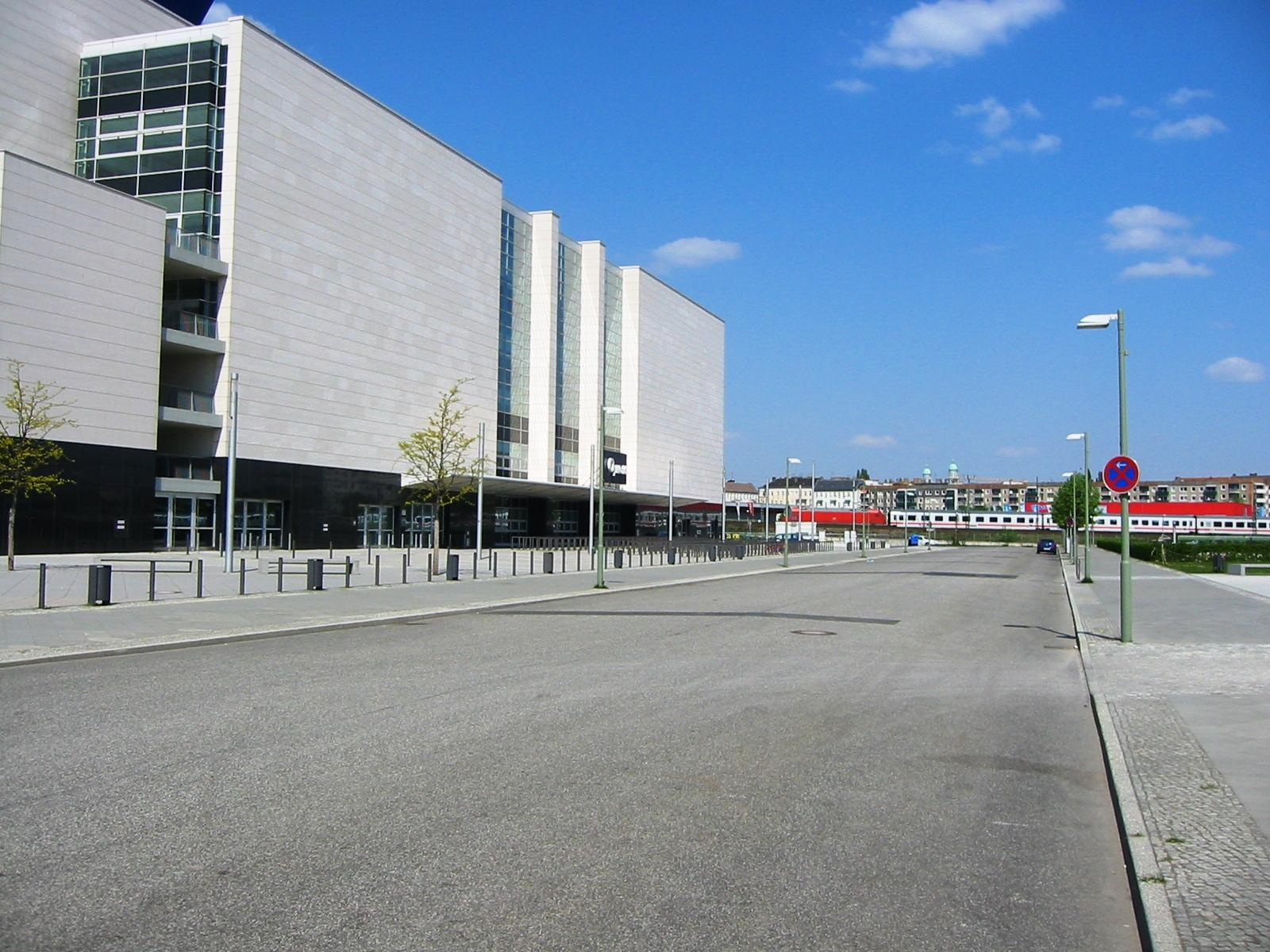
Hedwig-Wachenheim-Street in Berlin

== Death ==
Wachenheim died in Hanover in October 1969 while visiting Germany. She was buried at Jewish cemetery in Mannheim. Her estate is in the archive of the social democracy of the Friedrich-Ebert-Stiftung in Bonn.

== Honors ==
- She was awarded the Marie Juchacz plaque from the Arbeiterwohlfahrt in 1969.
- A number of streets and institutions were named after her.
- Hedwig-Wachenheim-Strasse in Berlin-Friedrichshain
- Hedwig Wachenheim-Karree in Cologne
- awo-Hedwig-Wachenheim family center in Wiehl
- awo Hedwig Wachenheim House in Lahr

== Bibliography ==
- Eckhard Hansen, Florian Tennstedt (eds.) And others: Biographical lexicon on the history of German social policy from 1871 to 1945 . Volume 2: Social politicians in the Weimar Republic and during National Socialism 1919 to 1945. Kassel University Press, Kassel 2018, ISBN 978-3-7376-0474-1, pp. 209 f. ( Online, PDF; 3.9 MB).
- Stine Harm: Citizens or Comrades? Carlo Schmid and Hedwig Wachenheim - Social Democrats despite their bourgeois origin. ibidem-Verlag, Stuttgart 2010, ISBN 978-3-8382-0104-7 .
- Susanne Zeller: Wachenheim, Hedwig, in: Hugo Maier (Ed.): Who is who of social work . Freiburg: Lambertus, 1998 ISBN 3-7841-1036-3, pp. 605f.
- Active Museum Association (ed.): Put in front of the door. Berlin 2006, ISBN 3-00-018931-9, p. 368.
- Corinna Schneider: Hedwig Wachenheim (1891–1969), SPD politician, co-founder of the workers' welfare organization, persecuted by National Socialism - “From the upper middle class to social democracy”. In: Mannheim history sheets. NF 29. 2015, pp. 81–102, ISSN 0948-2784 .
- Biography: Verfaßt Von Hedwig Wachenheim. N.p.: n.p., 1941.
