= August Dreesbach =

German politician and journalist

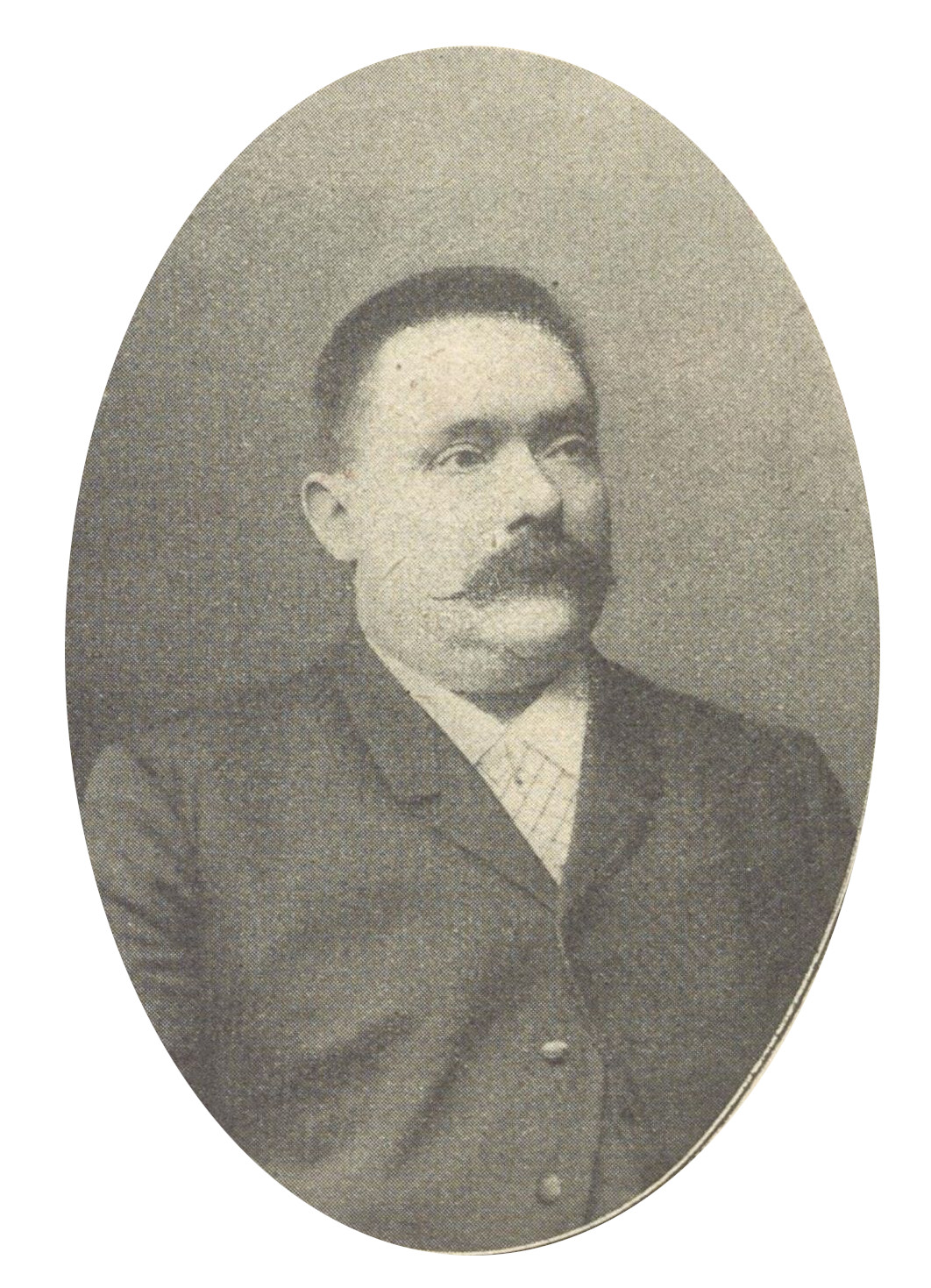
- Born: Hermann Josef August Dreesbach; 13 August 1844; Düsseldorf, Rhine Province, Prussia
- Died: November 25, 1906 (aged 62); Berlin, Germany
- Occupations: Tobacconist; Political agitator Politician; Political editor-journalist City councillor Member of parliament
- Political party: ADAV; SPD
- Spouse: Natalie Müller (1855–1942)
- Children: y

Hermann Josef August Dreesbach (13 August 1844 – 25 November 1906) was a German shop owner, concentrating on cigarettes, cigars and other tobacco products, who became a political agitator and then a politician, a political journalist and a pioneer of what became the country's Social Democratic Party (SPD). As Bismarck's contentious anti-Socialist Laws were allowed to lapse during 1890, Dreesbach was elected to membership of the ”Reichstag” (imperial parliament) in Berlin in February 1890, representing the electoral district of Mannheim. He remained a member, albeit with a break between 1893 and 1898, until his death, by which time he was among the best known of the SPD leaders on the national stage. It was estimated that 30,000 people took part in his funeral and cremation ceremonies, conducted in Mannheim on 2 December 1906.

== Life and works ==
=== Provenance ===
Hermann Josef August Dreesbach was born and grew up in Düsseldorf, where he attended middle school and then completed an apprenticeship in carpentry-joinery. His craft skills were much in demand during the second half of the nineteenth century, and as a young man he supported himself for several years as an wandering journeyman, during which time he lived and worked across Baden, Württemberg, Bavaria, Tirol and Austria. He came to appreciate the spirit of social and political freedoms available to citizens in those southern lands, beyond the direct influence of Prussia. He would later make his home in the Upper Rhine region rather than in the region in which he had grown up, and which since 1815 had been controlled from Berlin as the Prussian Rhine Province.

=== Politics ===
It was back home in Düsseldorf, one evening in March in 1863 or 1864, that Dreesbach attended a public meeting addressed by Ferdinand Lassalle. Before the evening ended, he had signed up for membership of the “Allgemeiner Deutscher Arbeiter-Verein ” (ADAV / ‘’General German Workers' Association’’). It quickly became clear that Dreesbach was a talented political orator or, in the term much used in Germany at the time, a political agitator. The wider political context was transformed in 1870/71 by German unification: the balance of powers and responsibilities between the German government (effectively a continuation of the former Prussian government) in Berlin and the governments of the other German states, such as the Grand Duchy of Baden was not immediately settled in every detail, however. Soon after joining the ADAV, Dreesbach returned to the south of Germany, initially to Stuttgart. From there he was sent in 1874, as a full-time ADAV political agitator, to Mannheim, a rapidly industrialising city which would become his longer-term political base. In 1875 he became the chairman of the Mannheim branch of the “Sozialistische Arbeiterpartei” (SAPD / Socialist Workers’ Party), formed that year through a merger of the ADAV with the ”Sozialdemokratische Arbeiterpartei Deutschlands ” (Social Democratic Workers’ Party), which was more powerfully represented in the industrial northern cities of Germany. The two organisations had much in common, but the potential for further growth of constitutional socialism would be held back by a series of so-called Anti-Socialist Laws passed by the government in Berlin during and after 1878.

In 1877 Dreesmann was appointed “Schriftleiter” (effectively managing editor) of the party's newly founded newspaper for the region straddling both sides of the Rhine, the “Pfälzisch-Badisches Volksblatt ”. A pilot edition was published on 1 September 1877. The newspaper then appeared on a weekly basis, published in Mannheim each Saturday between 5 January and 26 October during 1878. It was suppressed in response to the Berlin government's Anti-Socialist Laws, and the “Pfälzisch-Badische Preßverein” which had printed and distributed it was wound up.

=== City council ===
During the second half of the nineteenth century a new chemicals centred industry emerged in Mannheim, although the factories were sited across the river in Ludwigshafen in order to protect the citizens of Mannheim from the anticipated pollution that the factories would produce. (The fact that normally Mannheim finds itself downwind of Ludwigshafen, and thereby on the receiving end of industrial pollution from the factories has been a source of amusement for citizens of Ludwigshafen ever since.) Both cities benefited from the prosperity that decades of industrial expansion brought with them. The channelling of the Rhine between Mannheim and Basel during the middle part of the century, coupled with extensive railway construction along the Rhine and Neckar valleys, had also created a dynamic transport hub round the port of Mannheim. Wage levels in the countryside fell far below the industrial wages available in Mannheim and Ludwigshafen. As in other parts of Germany, industrial growth brought with it a rapidly expanding pool of potential voters for social democracy. In 1884 August Dreesbach was one of two members of what by this time was increasingly being referenced simply as the Social Democratic Party to be elected to the Mannheim city council. (The other was Franz Königshausen.) It was apparent that the anti-Socialist Laws, controversial from the outset, were capable of different levels of interpretation in different parts of Germany. Dreesbach's profile with voters in Mannheim rose, and at the end if 1886 he took the opportunity of a bye-election caused by the resignation of Mannheim's member of parliament (Reichstagsmitglied) to stand for election to the national parliament himself. He was not successful on this occasion, though the margin by which he lost during what seems to have been a passionately fought election campaign appeared, at one stage of the elaborate electoral process, to have been a narrow one.

=== Reichstag (national parliament) ===
In the 1890 General Election Dreesbach stood successfully for election to the Reichstag in the Mannheim constituency. His direct rival for the seat was an existing incumbent, the prominent local businessman Philipp Diffené of the NLP (Liberal Party), who had previously out-polled him in the city council elections. In the 1890 general election, Dreesbach secured election with 14,549 votes, as against 11,987 for his rival. Intriguingly, the occupations of both men involved the wholesale and retail trading in colonial goods with a focus on tobacco products. According to biographical information shared later in the “Amtliches Reichstags-Handbuch” by the parliamentary authorities, August Dreesbach was the proprietor of a shop selling colonial goods, tobacco products and cigars/cigarettes between 1878 and 1897. Friendly rivalry may on occasion have extended beyond mere political differences. Even if the development has an element of inevitability for those inclined to read history backwards, in the context of those times, his election to the Reichstag as the first Social Democrat member in history from Baden, in the immediate aftermath of twelve years hobbled by the anti-Socialist Laws, represented a very considerable personal and political achievement on the part of August Dreesbach.

With the national press ban lifted, it was also during 1890 that Dreesbach accepted appointment as director of the new party newspaper, “Volksstimme”. The pilot edition appeared in April 1890. The publication was able to celebrate forty unbroken years of weekly publication in May 1930.

In the 1893 general election, standing for election against Ernst Bassermann of the NLP (Liberal Party) in the single-member Mannheim electoral district, Dreesbach lost his Reichstag seat. He secured re-election in 1898, however.

=== Ständeversammlung (Landtag: state parliament for the Grand Duchy) ===
In November 1891 Dreesbach and Philipp August Rüdt – both of them from the Mannheim electoral district (“Wahlbezirk der Stadt Mannheim ”) – became the first two Social Democrats elected to membership of the lower (elected) chamber of the Badische Ständeversammlung (state parliament). It was not unusual, at that time, to serve as a member of the Baden Ständeversammlung and of the imperial parliament in Berlin simultaneously. Nevertheless, in 1903 Dreesbach resigned his membership of the state parliament in order to concentrate his time and energies nationally, on his Reichstag responsibilities and opportunities.

=== Death ===
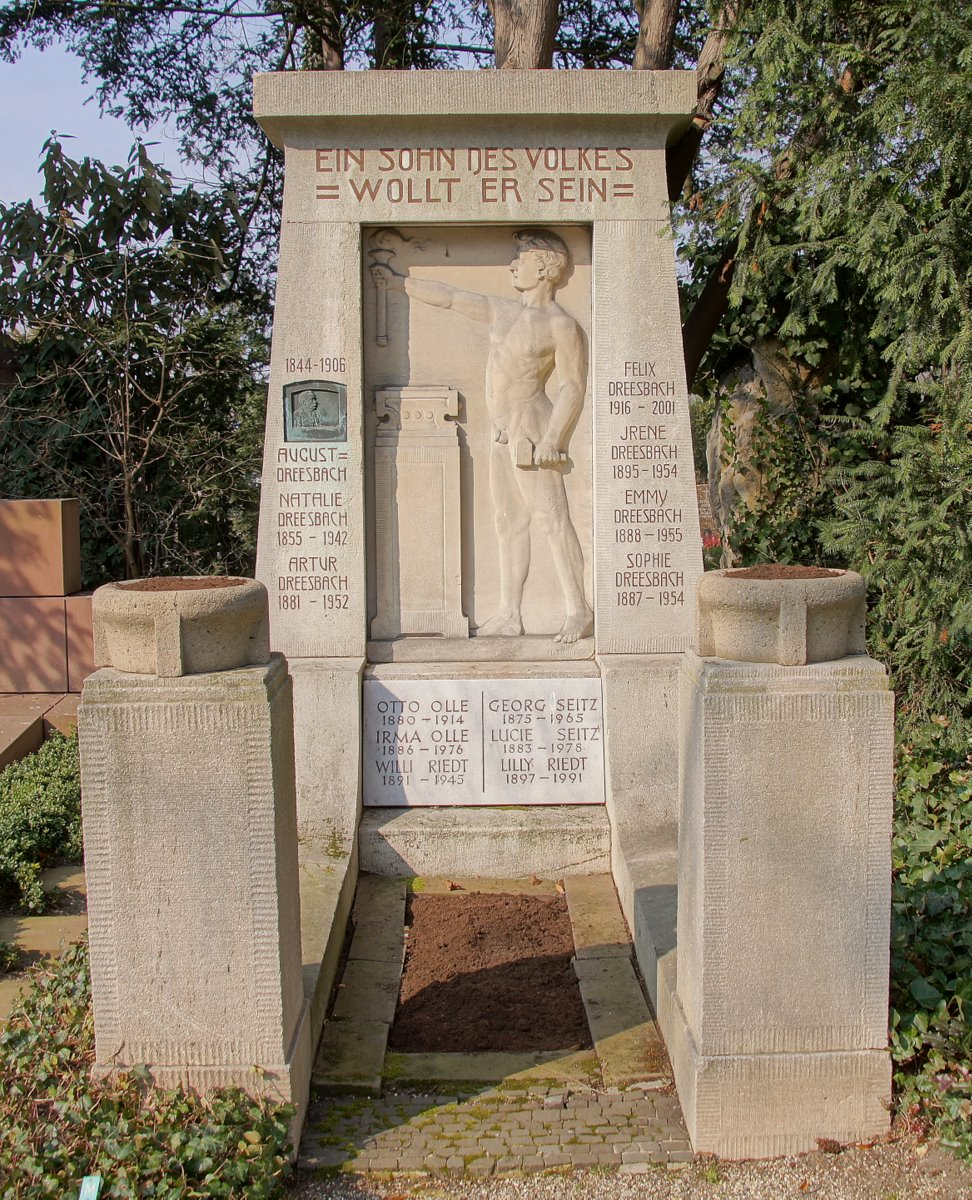
August Dreesbach's impressive grave memorial

On 25 November 1906 August Dreesbach suffered a stroke and died in Berlin. Still only 62, there were many who believed that at the time of his death he had stood on the brink of further political achievement. He was nevertheless one of a handful of Social Democrat leaders who guided the party successfully from government mandated pariah status towards the political mainstream, though it would still take democratic reforms including a major evening out of constituency sizes before SPD parliamentary representation would correspond approximately to the party's level of electoral support, whether in the national Reichstag or in the state-level Landtage. After he died his body was brought home to Mannheim for cremation and memorialising. An estimated 30,000 people took part in the funeral ceremonial, indicating that among the politically aware citizens of Mannhaim, and among socialist politicians across Germany, the scale of Dreesbach's contribution was well appreciated.

== Personal ==
August Dreesbach married Natalie Müller (1855–1942) in Berlin.

== Celebration ==
- August Dreesbach, together with his wife and various other family members, is commemorated by a large and impressive grave memorial in the form – according to one commentator - of an Egyptian temple entrance, at the Main Cemetery in Mannheim. The idealism and optimism of the first decade of the twentieth century can be inferred from the boldly carved “headline” at the top of the memorial: “Ein Sohn des Volkes wollt er sein” (“He wanted to be a son of the people”).
- The city authorities named a street after August Dreesbach in Mannheim-Neckarau.
- In 2006 historian-publisher Dr. Anne Dreesbach founded the “August Dreesbach Verlag” ("August Dreesbach publishing house") in Munich one hundred years after the death of its name giver. In naming her business, the director proprietor paid tribute to the “integrity and steadfastness in support of his beliefs” for which August Dreesbach can be remembered.
