= Retention and protention =

Aspects of Edmund Husserl's philosophy of phenomenology

Retention and protention (German: Retention und Protention) are key aspects of Edmund Husserl's phenomenology of temporality.

== Overview ==
Our experience of the world is not of a series of unconnected moments. Indeed, it would be impossible to have an experience of the world if we did not have a sense of temporality. That our perception brings an impression to our minds depends upon retention and protention.

Retention is the process whereby a phase of a perceptual act is retained in our consciousness. It is a presentation of that which is no longer before us and is distinct from immediate experience. A simple example might be that of watching a ball being thrown. We retain where the ball was in our minds to understand the momentum of the ball as we perceive it in the immediate present. Retention is not a representation or memory but a presentation of a temporally extended present. That is, a present that extends beyond the few short milliseconds that are registered in a moment of sense perception.

Protention (and not "protection" as written in the French translation) is our anticipation of the next moment. The moment that has yet to be perceived. Again, using the example of a ball, our focus shifts along the expected path the ball will take.

According to Husserl, perception has three temporal aspects, retention, the immediate present, and protention and a flow through which each moment of protention becomes the retention of the next.

Maurice Merleau-Ponty describes the temporal phenomenology of perception in the Phenomenology of Perception as follows:

"Husserl uses the terms protentions and retentions for the intentionalities which anchor me to an environment. They do not run from a central I, but from my perceptual field itself, so to speak, which draws along in its wake its own horizon of retentions, and bites into the future with its protentions. I do not pass through a series of instances of now, the images of which I preserve and which, placed end to end, make a line. With the arrival of every moment, its predecessor undergoes a change: I still have it in hand and it is still there, but already it is sinking away below the level of presents; in order to retain it, I need to reach through a thin layer of time. It is still the preceding moment, and I have the power to rejoin it as it was just now; I am not cut off from it, but still it would not belong to the past unless something had altered, unless it were beginning to outline itself against, or project itself upon, my present, whereas a moment ago it was my present. When a third moment arrives, the second undergoes a new modification; from being a retention it becomes the retention of a retention, and the layer of time between it and me thickens."

Interesting links with this theory come from current neuroscience which shows that present, past and future are always intertwined, also in memory. Accordingly, “memory is not only about the past, but is also about the future. Indeed, while memory serves as the ability to recall previous experiences, recall itself is not solely directed toward the past, but is guided by the present for the service of the future”.

== See also ==
- Maurice Merleau-Ponty
- Nachgewahren
- Transcendental idealism
