= Interpretative phenomenological analysis =

Approach to qualitative psychological research

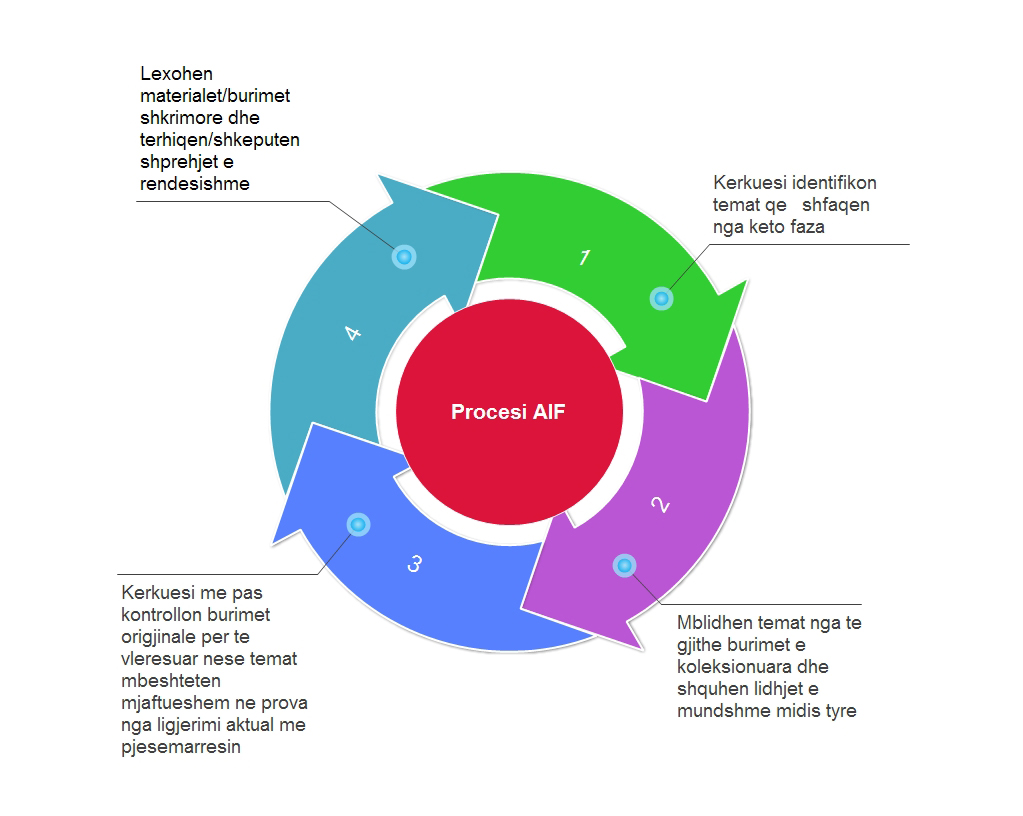

Interpretative phenomenological analysis (IPA) is a qualitative form of psychology research. IPA has an idiographic focus, which means that instead of producing generalization findings, it aims to offer insights into how a given person, in a given context, makes sense of a given situation. Usually, these situations are of personal significance; examples might include a major life event, or the development of an important relationship. IPA has its theoretical origins in phenomenology and hermeneutics, and many of its key ideas are inspired by the work of Edmund Husserl, Martin Heidegger, and Maurice Merleau-Ponty. IPA's tendency to combine psychological, interpretative, and idiographic elements is what distinguishes it from other approaches to qualitative, phenomenological psychology.

== Taking part ==
Sometimes IPA studies involve a close examination of the experiences and meaning-making activities of only one participant. Most frequently they draw on the accounts of a small number of people (6 has been suggested as a good number, although anywhere between 3 and 15 participants for a group study can be acceptable). In either case, participants are invited to take part precisely because they can offer the researcher some meaningful insight into the topic of the study; this is called purposive sampling [i.e. it is not randomised]. Usually, participants in an IPA study are expected to have certain experiences in common with one another: the small-scale nature of a basic IPA study shows how something is understood in a given context, and from a shared perspective, a method sometimes called homogeneous sampling. More advanced IPA study designs may draw together samples that offer multiple perspectives on a shared experience (husbands and wives, for example, or psychiatrists and patients); or they may collect accounts over a period of time, to develop a longitudinal analysis.

== Data collection ==
In IPA, researchers gather qualitative data from research participants using techniques such as interview, diaries, or focus group. Typically, these are approached from a position of flexible and open-ended inquiry, and the interviewer adopts a stance that is curious and facilitative (rather than, say, challenging and interrogative). IPA usually requires personally salient accounts of some richness and depth, and it requires that these accounts be captured in a way that permits the researcher to work with a detailed verbatim transcript.

== Data analysis ==
Data collection does not set out to test hypotheses, and this stance is maintained in data analysis. The analyst reflects upon their own preconceptions about the data, and attempts to suspend these in order to focus on grasping the experiential world of the research participant. Transcripts are coded in considerable detail, with the focus shifting back and forth from the key claims of the participant, to the researcher's interpretation of the meaning of those claims. IPA's hermeneutic stance is one of inquiry and meaning-making, and so the analyst attempts to make sense of the participant's attempts to make sense of their own experiences, thus creating a double hermeneutic. One might use IPA if one had a research question which aimed to understand what a given experience was like (phenomenology) and how someone made sense of it (interpretation).

Analysis in IPA is said to be 'bottom-up'. This means that the researcher generates codes from the data, rather than using a pre-existing theory to identify codes that might be applied to the data. IPA studies do not test theories, then, but they are often relevant to the development of existing theories. One might use the findings of a study on the meaning of sexual intimacy to gay men in close relationships, for example, to re-examine the adequacy of theories which attempt to predict and explain safe sex practices. IPA encourages an open-ended dialogue between the researcher and the participants and may, therefore, lead us to see things in a new light.

After transcribing the data, the researcher works closely and intensively with the text, annotating it closely ('coding') for insights into the participants' experience and perspective on their world. As the analysis develops, the researcher catalogues the emerging codes, and subsequently begins to look for patterns in the codes. These patterns are called 'themes'. Themes are recurring patterns of meaning (ideas, thoughts, feelings) throughout the text. Themes are likely to identify both something that matters to the participants (i.e. an object of concern, topic of some import) and also convey something of the meaning of that thing, for the participants. E.g. in a study of the experiences of young people learning to drive, we might find themes like 'Driving as a rite of passage' (where one key psychosocial understanding of the meaning of learning to drive, is that it marks a cultural threshold between adolescence and adulthood).

Some themes will eventually be grouped under much broader themes called 'superordinate themes'. For example, 'Feeling anxious and overwhelmed during the first driving lessons' might be a superordinate category that captures a variety of patterns in participants' embodied, emotional and cognitive experiences of the early phases of learning to drive, where sub-themes relating to, say, 'Feeling nervous', 'Worrying about losing control', and 'Struggling to manage the complexities of the task' might be found. The final set of themes are typically summarised and placed into a table or similar structure where evidence from the text is given to back up the themes produced by a quote from the text.

== Analysis ==
In IPA, a good analysis is one that balances phenomenological description with insightful interpretation and anchors these interpretations in the participants' accounts. It is also likely to maintain an idiographic focus (so that particular variation are not lost), and to keep a close focus on meaning (rather than say, causal relations). A degree of transparency (contextual detail about the sample, a clear account of the process, adequate commentary on the data, key points illustrated by verbatim quotes) is also crucial to estimating the plausibility and transferability of an IPA study. Engagement with credibility issues (such as cross-validation, cooperative inquiry, independent audit, or triangulation) is also likely to increase the reader's confidence.

== Applications ==
Due to an increased interest in the constructed nature of certain aspects of illness (how people perceive bodily and mental symptoms), IPA has been particularly recommended for its uses in the field of health psychology. However, while this subject-centered approach to experiencing illness is congruent with an increase in patient-centered research, IPA may have been historically most employed in health psychology due to the fact that many of its initial supporters operated careers in this field.

With a general increase in the number of IPA studies published over the last decade has come to the employment of this method in a variety of fields including business (organisational psychology ), sexuality, and key life transitions such as transitioning into motherhood and living with cancer as a chronic illness.

== See also ==
- Action research
- Emic and etic
- Ethnography
- Existential phenomenology
- Hermeneutic phenomenology
- Jonathan Smith (psychologist)
- Participatory action research
- Phenomenology
- Triangulation (social science)
