= Amedeo Giorgi =

American psychologist

- Born: 1931 (age 94–95); New York City, New York, USA
- Known for: Contributions to phenomenology and humanistic psychology

Academic background
- Education: St. Joseph's College; Fordham University

Amedeo P. Giorgi (born 1931, in New York City) is an American psychologist known for his contributions to phenomenology and humanistic psychology. He developed the Descriptive Phenomenological Method in Psychology.

== Early life and education ==
Born in New York City in 1931, Amedeo Giorgi grew up in Philadelphia.

He received a bachelor's degree from St. Joseph's College, Philadelphia, then a Doctor of Philosophy in experimental psychology from Fordham University in 1958.

== Career ==
After working as a researcher in the private sector, Giorgi began his academic career, ultimately holding academic positions at Manhattan College (1960–1962), Duquesne University (1962–1986), Saybrook University (1986-present), and University of Quebec at Montreal (1990–1995). Following retirement, he holds the position of professor emeritus with Saybrook.

In addition to his academic positions, he served as the founder and original editor of Journal of Phenomenological Psychology from 1970 to 1993.

In academia, Giorgi's work drew from Edmund Husserl's and Maurice Merleau-Ponty's approaches to phenomenology to develop approaches to qualitative psychological research, including the descriptive phenomenological method in psychology.

Giorgi and Adrian Van Kaam were founding members of the "Duquesne School" of psychology, where he began formalizing phenomenological methods for psychology. He was a key figure in the history of the humanistic psychology movement, alongside such notable pioneers as Carl Rogers and Fritz Perls. He is a noted historian of the field of psychology, particularly alternative strands.

== Books ==
=== As author ===
- Psychology as a Human Science: A Phenomenologically-based Approach. New York: Harper & Row. 1970.
- The Descriptive Phenomenological Method in Psychology: A Modified Husserlian Approach. Pittsburgh: Duquesne University Press. 2009. ISBN 978-0-82070418-0.
- Reflections on Certain Qualitative and Phenomenological Psychological Methods. Colorado Springs: University Professor's Press. 2018. ISBN 978-1-93968625-1.

=== As editor ===
- Giorgi, Amedeo, ed. (1985). Phenomenology and Psychological Research. Pittsburgh: Duquesne University Press. ISBN 978-0-8207-0174-5.
- Ashworth, Peter D.; Giorgi, Amedeo; Koning, A. J. J. de, eds. (1986). Qualitative Research in Psychology. Pittsburgh: Duquesne University Press. ISBN 978-0-8207-0189-9.
