= Daniel Came =

British philosopher

Education
- Education: University of Cambridge (BA, MPhil)

Philosophical work
- Era: Contemporary philosophy
- Region: Western philosophy
- School: Analytic philosophy Continental philosophy
- Main interests: History of philosophy, Philosophy of religion, Aesthetics, Schopenhauer, Nietzsche
- Website: https://daniel-came.weebly.com/

Daniel Came is a British philosopher. He is Senior Lecturer in philosophy at the University of Lincoln. He is also an International Visiting Fellow at Mathias Corvinus Collegium in Budapest, Hungary, and a Visiting Professor of Philosophy at the School of Law, Ponnaiyah Ramajayam Institute of Science and Technology, Madurai, India. He was previously Lecturer in Philosophy, at the University of Hull, College Lecturer in Philosophy at St Hugh's College, Oxford, and Lecturer in Philosophy at Birkbeck College, University of London. His research focuses on post-Kantian European philosophy, especially the work of Arthur Schopenhauer and Friedrich Nietzsche, as well as ethics, aesthetics and the philosophy of religion. Came is also known for engaging in public debates about religion and the existence of God with figures such as William Lane Craig and Richard Dawkins.

== Biography ==
Came studied philosophy at undergraduate and masters level at Cambridge University before completing a DPhil in philosophy at Oxford University. His doctoral research focussed on Nietzsche's attempt to reconcile the existence and inevitability of suffering with the affirmation of life. Following his doctoral studies Came was appointed Junior Research Fellow in Philosophy at Worcester College, Oxford, (2007–10). He has since served as College Lecturer in Philosophy at St Hugh's College, Oxford (2011-2013) and Lecturer in Philosophy at the University of Hull (2013-2017) before being appointed Senior Lecturer in Philosophy at the University of Lincoln in 2017. In 2017 Came founded the Lincoln Philosophy Salon, which serves as a public forum for philosophical discussion in Lincoln, England. The Salon has hosted speakers including A.C. Grayling, Nancy Cartwright, Stephen Priest, Raymond Tallis, Benedikt Paul Göcke, David Papineau, James Lenman, and Angie Hobbs, and its live stream has been viewed by audiences in the USA, Germany, Croatia, Egypt, and Vietnam.

Came is also a musician. In December 2022, his composition for acoustic guitar, 'Valediction', was released by Candyrat Records. A second composition for acoustic guitar, ‘The Empty Chair’, was released by Candyrat Records in March 2024. In September 2024, Came released an album of mostly electronic music written for films that do not exist entitled Music for Imaginary Films.

Came has three children.

== Publications ==
=== Books ===
- Nietzsche on Religion (Cambridge: Cambridge University Press, 2026)
- Nietzsche on Morality and the Affirmation of Life (New York and Oxford: Oxford University Press, 2022)
- Nietzsche on Art and Life (New York and Oxford: Oxford University Press, 2014)

=== Papers ===
- 'Against Penal Moralism: Nietzsche on the Nonmoral Foundations of Punishment’, European Journal of Political Philosophy, Spring Issue (2026)
- ‘Nietzsche as a Christian Thinker’ in D. Came (ed.) Nietzsche on Morality and the Affirmation of Life, (Oxford: Oxford University Press, 2022).
- ‘Schopenhauer and Nietzsche on Pessimism and Life-Affirmation’, in Patrick Hassan (ed.), Schopenhauer’s Moral Philosophy (London: Routledge 2021).
- 'Über radikale Lebensverlängerung und die Verneinung des Todes,' in Benedikt Göcke (ed.), Designobjekt Mensch?! Probleme und Chancen des Transhumanismus aus Philosophischer, Theologischer und Naturwissenschaftlicher Perspektive, (Herder-Verlag, 2018).
- 'Theism and Contrastive Explanation,' in European Journal for Philosophy of Religion, 9 (3) 2017.
- 'The Socratic Justification of Existence: Nietzsche on Wissenschaft and Existential Meaning', in Katsafanas, P., (ed.), Routledge Great Minds: Nietzsche, (London, Routledge, 2016).
- 'Nietzsche on the Aesthetics of Character and Virtue', in Came, D., (ed.), Nietzsche on Art and Life, (Oxford: Oxford University Press, 2014).
- 'The Themes of Affirmation and Illusion in The Birth of Tragedy and Beyond', in Richardson, J., and Gemes, K., (eds.), The Oxford Handbook of Nietzsche, (Oxford: Oxford University Press, 2014).
- 'Moral and Aesthetic Judgments Reconsidered', Journal of Value Inquiry 46 (2) 2012: 159-171
- 'Schopenhauer on the Metaphysics of Art and Morality', in Vandenabeele, B., (ed.), A Companion to Schopenhauer, (Oxford: Blackwell, 2012): 237-249.
- 'Schopenhauer on Salvation and the Highest Good', in Wasmaier-Sailer, M., and Goecke, B., (eds.), Idealismus als Chance für die natürliche Theologie (Berlin: Verlag Karl Alber, 2011): 258-274.
- 'Disinterestedness and Objectivity', The European Journal of Philosophy, 17 (1) 2009: 91-100.
- 'The Aesthetic Justification of Existence', in Ansell-Pearson, K., (ed.), A Companion to Nietzsche, (Oxford: Blackwell, 2005): 41-56.
- 'Nietzsche’s Attempt at a Self-Criticism: Art and Morality in The Birth of Tragedy', Nietzsche-Studien, 33 (2004): 37-67.
- 'The Experience of Musical Expressiveness', Proceedings of the American Society for Aesthetics, (Asilomar, Calif., 2002): 148-164.
