= KronoScope =

- Discipline: Interdisciplinary
- Language: English
- Edited by: Felipe Torres

Publication details
- History: 2001-present
- Publisher: Brill Publishers (The Netherlands)
- Frequency: biannually

Standard abbreviations
- ISO 4: KronoScope

Indexing
- ISSN: 1568-5241

Links
- Journal homepage; online access

KronoScope. Journal for the Study of Time is a peer-reviewed academic journal dedicated to the interdisciplinary study of time, both in the humanities and in the sciences. It is published biannually under the imprint of Brill Publishers on behalf of the International Society for the Study of Time. It is indexed in Sociological Abstracts.

== See also ==
- Julius Thomas Fraser
- Temporality
