= Chronosophy =

Study of time

Chronosophy is the neologistic designation given by scholar Julius Thomas (J.T.) Fraser to "the interdisciplinary and normative study of time sui generis."

== Overview ==
=== Etymology ===
Fraser derived the term from the Ancient Greek: χρόνος, chronos, "time" and σοφία, sophia, "wisdom". Chronosophia is thus defined as the "specific human skill or knowledge . . . pertaining to time . . . [which] all men seem to possess to some degree . . .".

=== Purpose ===
Fraser outlined the purpose of the discipline of chronosophy in five intentions, as follows:

1. to encourage the search for new knowledge related to time;
2. to set up and apply criteria regarding which fields of knowledge contribute to an understanding of time, and what they may contribute;
3. to assist in epistemological studies, especially in those related to the structure of knowledge;
4. to provoke communication between the humanities and the sciences using time as the common theme; and
5. to help us learn more about the nature of time by providing channels for the direct confrontation of a multitude of views.

=== Assumptions ===
According to Fraser, any pursuit of chronosophical knowledge necessarily makes two assumptions:

1. When specialists speak of 'time', they speak of various aspects of the same entity.
2. Said entity is amenable to study by the methods of the sciences, can be made a meaningful subject of contemplation by the reflective mind, and can be used as proper material for intuitive interpretation by the creative artist.

Fraser labeled these two assumptions the unity of time. Together they amount to the proposition that all of us, working separately, are nevertheless headed toward the same central idea (i.e., chronosophia).

In contradistinction to the aforementioned, Fraser posits the diversity of time: the existence of time's myriad manifestations, which "hardly needs proof; it is all too apparent."

The continued qualitative and quantitative mediation of the unresolvable conflict between the unity and diversity of time would thus be the sole methodological criterion for measuring chronosophical progress. This conflict manifests itself not so much as between the humanities and the sciences (although this interpretation is cogent and apt), but rather between knowledge felt (i.e., passion) and knowledge understood (i.e., knowledge proper). Fraser envisions the total creativity of a society as being dependent on the effectiveness of "a harmonious dialogue between the two great branches of knowledge." He observes (paraphrasing Giordano Bruno): "The creative activity of the mind consists of the search for the one in the many, for simplicity in variety. There is no better and more fundamental problem than the problem of time in respect to which such [a] search may be conducted. It is always present and always tantalizing, it is the basic material of man's rational and emotive inquiries." Just as a mature individual can reconcile within themselves the unity and diversity of day-to-day noetic existence, so too could a mature social conception of time mediate the difference between—and perhaps ultimately reconcile—the unity and diversity of time.

=== Organization ===
Chronosophy defies systematic organization, for—like philosophy—it is a kind of ur-discipline, subsuming all other disciplines through a proposed unifying characteristic: temporality. (Hence, the possibility of producing a branch of knowledge lacking temporal import, e.g. [arguably] ontology and/or metaphysics, remains; however, "atemporality" is still, by definition, a temporal category: a regress ensues.)

Fraser wrote that a successful study of time would "encourage communication across the traditional boundaries of systems of knowledge and seek a framework which . . . may permit interaction of experience and theorizing related to time without regard to the sources of experience and theory." Thus, the only methodological commitment that a chronosopher need make is to interdisciplinarity.

While Fraser neglects to develop a systematic chronosophical methodology in The Voices of Time, he does proffer a selection of idiomatically interdisciplinary categories to spur the research of future scholars:

- surveys of historical and current ideas of time in the sciences and in the humanities;
- studies of the relation of time to ideas of conceptual extremities such as a) to motion and rest, b) to atomicity and continuity, c) to the spatially very large and very small, and d) to the quantities of singular and many;
- comparative analysis of those properties of time that various fields of learning and intuitive expressions designate unproblematically as "the nature of time";
- inquiries into the processes and methods whereby man learns to perceive, proceeds to measure, and proposes to reason about time;
- exploration of the role of time in the communication of thought and emotion;
- search for an understanding of the relation of time to personal identity and death;
- research concerning time and organic evolution, time and the psychological development of man, and the role f time in the growth of civilizations; and
- determination of the status of chronosophy vis-à-vis the traditional systems of knowledge.

The nature of the above categories would require that chronosophy be regarded as an independent system of experiential, experimental, and theoretical knowledge about time.

=== General characteristics ===
In general, chronosophical pursuits are characterized by

1. expansion beyond or abandonment of [traditional areas of] specialization, and
2. the espousal of interdisciplinary or pan-disciplinary methodologies;

(1) is a weak criterion, while (2) is a strong one.

Neither of the above criteria make reference to time or temporality; for while the ontological possibly of timeless knowledge must always remain, admission of this possibility begs the question (petitio principii): e.g., what form does timeless knowledge take? how would it come to us? how could we ever be separated from such knowledge to begin with? et cetera ad nauseam. The admission is therefore a paradox (akin to Wittgenstein's seventh proposition in Tractatus Logico-Philosophicus: "Whereof one cannot speak, thereof one must be silent."). We must conclude that the proposal of the possibility of timeless knowledge is both necessary and senseless, a conceptual counterpart to the tautologous nature of the concept of time. Should we come to possess knowledge of that which is "beneath" or "behind" time (or, alternatively, conclude we could never have lost possession of it), there would be no discernible need for further chronosophical inquiry—in the face of such eternal truth, it would instead be chronosophy as currently conceived that would appear both necessary and senseless.

Hence: all disciplines are necessarily chronosophical (until proven otherwise).

Caveat: for the sake of logicality, future manifestations of chronosophy may resemble more closely some methods of knowing than others; however, due to the character of the "problem" of time no chronosophical endeavor could ever be thoroughly purged of its interdisciplinary perspectives: a satisfactory theory of time must necessarily satisfy a wide variety of specifications (i.e., by definition a satisfactory or sufficient chronosophy would accommodate every office of human knowledge as pertains to the subject, time).

=== Envoi ===
Why should we afford time this privileged status among our speculative and empirical undertakings?

A Fraserian chronosopher would argue that mediation of the problem(s) of time is essential to the creation and retention of individual and social identity. Hence, as long as we—as individuals and as social groups—continue to partake in the process of clarifying and defining our individual and collective identities over and against those of the world (in whole or in part) around us, the necessarily contemporaneous clarification and definition of the problem(s) of time must, by extension (mutatis mutandis), be universal and continuous.

== See also ==
- Time
- Temporality
- Julius Thomas Fraser
- Natural Philosophy
- Philosophy of Space and Time
- Horology
- Cosmology
- Eschatology
- Ontology
- Metaphysics
