= Descriptive phenomenological method in psychology =

The descriptive phenomenological method in psychology was developed by the American psychologist Amedeo Giorgi in the early 1970s. Giorgi based his method on principles laid out by philosophers like Edmund Husserl and Maurice Merleau-Ponty as well as what he had learned from his prior professional experience in psychophysics. Giorgi was an early pioneer of the humanistic psychology movement, the use of phenomenology in psychology, and qualitative research in psychology, and to this day continues to advocate for the importance of a human science approach to psychological subject matter. Giorgi has directed over 100 dissertations that have used the Descriptive Phenomenological Method on a wide variety of psychological problems, and he has published over 100 articles on the phenomenological approach to psychology.

== Theoretical perspective ==
Giorgi promotes phenomenology as a theoretical movement that avoids certain simplified tendencies sustained by many modern approaches to psychological research. According to the phenomenological psychological perspective embraced by Giorgi, researchers are encouraged to "bracket" their own assumptions pertaining to the phenomenon in question by refraining from positing a static sense of objective reality for oneself and the participants whose experiences are being studied. This allows the researchers to attend to the descriptions of the participants without forcing the meaning of the descriptive units into pre-defined categories.

An important aspect of the descriptive phenomenological method in psychology is the way by which it distinguishes itself from those approaches that are strictly interpretive. In this, Giorgi closely follows Husserl who proposes that "being given and being interpreted are descriptions of the same situation from two different levels of discourse." As such, in the Descriptive Phenomenological Method there are both descriptive and interpretive moments, but the researcher remains careful to attend to each type of act in unique ways. Through a sort of empathetic immersion with the subjects and their descriptions, the researchers get a sense of the ways that the experiences given by the participants were actually lived, which is in turn described. During this process, however, theoretical or speculative interpretation should be avoided so as to flesh out the full lived meaning inherent to the descriptions themselves (Giorgi, 2009, p. 127). Interpretation may then occur to various extents during other phases of the research process, but only as it relates to implications of the results rather than the lived meaning of the participants' experiences.

Another form of Descriptive phenomenological method in psychology was proposed by Paul Colaizzi. This method follows a distinctive seven step process that stays close to the data while providing strong analysis.

== Phenomenological intuition ==
The Descriptive Phenomenological Method involves neither deduction nor induction in order to find meaning, but instead asks the researcher to intuit what is essential to the phenomenon being studied. Intuition, in this sense (going along with the philosophy of phenomenology), simply means that an object (or state of affairs, structural whole, proposition etc.) becomes presented to consciousness in a certain mode of giveness. In the context of this research method, therefore, intuition is used in order to get a sense of the lived meaning of each description so as to relate them to what is known about the phenomenon of interest in general These types of generalities are not statistical probabilities nor universally posited, but are dependent upon the lived meaning of the descriptions and the meaning of the phenomenon being studied.

== Data analysis ==
The phenomenological psychological attitude is to be assumed while analyzing the data in order to ensure that "the results reflect a careful description of precisely the features of the experienced phenomenon as they present themselves to the consciousness of the researcher" (Giorgi, 2009, pp. 130–131). In the phenomenological psychological attitude, the psychological acts of the participants are affirmed to be real while the objects at which those acts are directed are reduced to what appears as psychologically relevant to the particular experience being attended to. In this sense, the researcher attends to the phenomenon in its "own appropriate mode of self-givenness, thus [meeting] the demand for scientific objectivity concerning the subjective: the method of phenomenological reduction" (Scanlon, 1977, xiv) With this method, this is done so as to reach a level of understanding that is appropriate for psychologists, while also helping the researcher to reach a sort of empathically sensed intuition of the experiences, in the sense used by Eugene Gendlin

Each description given by the participants is first read through in its entirety in order to get a better sense of the whole situation in which the experiences occurred. Then each description is attended to individually as the researcher goes through and marks off different units of meaning within the data in order to make the descriptions more manageable. After a single description is broken down into separate units, each unit can then be transformed from the language through which it was given into "psychologically sensitive" meaning units, which is done with the help of imaginative variation. This process is meant to flesh out the horizons of the lived meaning more fully in order to expand the possibilities inherent to the phenomenon being studied. Finally, after all the descriptions have undergone these steps, general psychological structures, in the sense described above, are sought. For Giorgi (2009), "essential psychological structure" refers to: "[A depiction] of the lived experience of a phenomenon, which may include aspects of the description of which the experiencer was unaware. The psychological structure is not a definition. It is meant to depict how certain phenomena that get named are lived, which includes experiential and conscious moments seen from a psychological perspective. A psychological perspective means that the lived meanings are based on an individual but get expressed eidetically, which means that they are general."

The final structure is meant to serve as an ideal representation of the phenomenon being studied, based upon actual instantiations of it within concrete lived experiences. It may be the case that such structures turn up many times again, or their relevance may be limited to the cases studied in a particular study. Either way, they have the potential to reveal a lived understanding of a certain phenomenon without first requiring a certain theoretical framework in order to comprehend it.

The Colaizzi method for data analysis proceeds as follows:

1. Familiarization: The researcher reads the participants description multiple times until it is familiar.
2. Identifying Significant Statements: The researcher Identifies all the relevant statements that directly relate to the select phenomenon.
3. Formulating Meanings: While bracketing their own assumptions, the researcher identify meanings relevant to the phenomenon from the significant statements.
4. Clustering Themes: The researcher clusters the identified meanings into themes considering all the accounts presented. Bracketing is again important to ensure internal validity.
5. Developing an Exhaustive Description: The researcher writes a full description of the phenomenon including the themes compiled from step 4.
6. Producing the Fundamental Structure: The researcher condenses the statement form the previous step into a dense statement that shows the essential aspects of the select phenomenon.
7. Seeking Verification of the Fundamental Structure: The statement from step 6 is returned to all the participants to verify that this captures their experience. Based on their response the researcher may reevaluate the analysis.

This last step in particular has been criticized by Giorgi who stated that the researcher and the participant will have different perspectives.
