= The Voices of Time =

The Voices of Time may refer to:

- The Voices of Time (collection), a collection of science fiction short stories by J. G. Ballard

- The Voices of Time (short story), a dystopian science fiction short story by British author J. G. Ballard

- The Voices of Time (paper), a regularly cited classic of time studies by Julius Thomas Fraser
- Voices of Time: A Life in Stories, by Eduardo Galeano
