= Throwing Like a Girl =

1980 feminist essay by Iris Marion Young

Throwing like a Girl: A Phenomenology of Feminine Body Comportment Motility and Spatiality
- Author: Iris Marion Young
- Language: English
- Subject: Perception
- Published: 1980 (Human Studies); 1990 (Indiana UP); 2005 (Oxford UP)
- Media type: Journal article
- Pages: 20

"Throwing like a Girl: A Phenomenology of Feminine Body Comportment Motility and Spatiality" is a 1980 essay by political philosopher and feminist Iris Marion Young which examines differences in feminine and masculine norms of movement in the context of a gendered and embodied phenomenological perspective. Young's essay uses ideas from philosophers Simone de Beauvoir and Maurice Merleau-Ponty to examine how perceptions of the female body relate to task performance and confidence.

== Summary ==
=== Introduction ===
Young begins her essay with a critique of Erwin Straus and his conclusion that differences in movement between men and women are rooted in biology. Straus studied the differences in how young boys and girls each threw a ball, and noted that the boys utilized more physical space and energy to exert their throw, concluding that the differences were due to biological difference. Young argues that because these children were pre-pubescent and were physically quite similar, their differing approaches were due to differing understandings of body comportment.

To elaborate, Young introduces Simone de Beauvoir’s account of women’s existence as constrained. Young asserts that de Beauvoir neglected several important aspects and, formulated to misconception that women's anatomies that determine their being unfree. The female body then becomes something to transcend, or break free from, rather than something that people recognize is in fact conditioned to be the way it is.

Young explains this gap in understanding as her motivation in writing the essay; to examine further the functionality of women's bodies in a given space. The society she focuses on is about women in a "contemporary advanced industrial, urban, and commercial society" specifically, with attention to how the modalities of the feminine body are restricted in attempt to achieve specific goals, such as throwing a ball.

To outline the framework of her essay, Young first defines what it means to be feminine as "a set of structures and conditions which delimit the typical situation of being a woman in a particular society, as well as the typical way in which this situation is lived by the women themselves." Femininity is therefore not a characteristic or trait, but a quality of the female existence. Young argues women are "Others" in society, and are deprived of basic human qualities because of their sub-ordinance within the patriarchy. Women must therefore struggle to transcend this bodily comportment, Young argues.

=== Section I: Observations on Feminine Body Comportment ===
Young returns to Straus's observations of women engaging in physical activity, incorporating her own experiences to make the argument that women are physically no less capable than men, but underperform due to psychological barriers. She claims that women engage in a self-fulfilling prophecy, in which they do not see themselves as capable, so they do not “summon the full possibilities of our muscular coordination, position, poise, and bearing” that men do. This is partially attributable to the idea that a woman has a constricted space to move in, while a man does not feel these limitations. In addition to the fear of taking up too much space, women also have a stronger fear of getting hurt, and underestimate their bodily capacity. Young writes, "We decide beforehand — usually mistakenly — that the task is beyond us, and thus give it less than our full effort." This concept results in the phrase, "throwing like a girl"; although women are physically capable of throwing, and performing other physical tasks, successfully, their understanding of societal bodily comportment restricts their performances of those tasks.

=== Section II: A Phenomenological Account of the Modalities of Feminine Bodily Comportment & Mobility ===
In Section II, Young explains three modalities of feminine mobility that prevent a woman from engaging in the world to her body's full capacity. She cites Merleau-Ponty, Sartre, and previous "intellectual thinkers," who argued that a person could transcend societal boundaries by consciousness alone. Young contests this idea, observing that the body itself must remain aware of its surroundings in the effort to transcend. She identifies feminine transcendence as ambiguous transcendence, explaining that "all transcendence is ambiguous because the body as natural and material is immanence." Young refers to her previous observations that women only use parts of their body to perform a task, and thus concludes that while these parts move, the rest of the female body remains rooted in immanence. Women simultaneously view their bodies as a burden and as something that needs protecting.

Young explains this existence as in an inhibited intentionality. She writes, "When the woman enters a task with inhibited intentionality, she projects the possibilities of that task — thus projects an "I can" — but projects them merely as the possibilities of "someone," and not truly her possibilities — and thus projects an "/ cannot." This again refers to her previously stated self-fulfilling prophecy, in which women do not succeed in tasks to the best of their ability because they do not believe that they can do so.

The third modality of feminine mobility presented in Young's essay is discontinuous unity. Young theorizes that the female body sees its surrounding space as "a continuous extension of its own being," thus restricting its own movement. Additionally, the parts of a body that move when performing a task are isolated from the rest of her body, which remains immobile. Merleau-Ponty explains that women thus see their bodies as both the subject and object of an action; for example, "women have a tendency to take up the motion of an object coming toward them as coming at them." When a woman views her body as the object of the action rather than the subject, it is even more difficult for her body to transcend and perform to its full capability.

Young concludes that women therefore have constrained bodily comportment and mobility, because they see their bodies as objects rooted in an immanence they are unable to transcend.

=== Section III: The Spatiality Generated by Modalities ===
Young next delves into the concept of female bodies in their respective spaces, and introduces Merleau-Ponty's distinction between lived space and objective space. These two concepts merge for men, but for women, their existence is confined in their living space and does not expand into all objective space. Young cites a study by Erik Erikson, in which Erikson asked several young male and female participants to construct a scene for a movie, given a set of props. He observed that the females set their scenes constricted inside, utilizing "inner space," while the males set their scenes in the outdoors, utilizing "outer space." Erikson concluded that this was a psychoanalytic expression, with respect to each gender's anatomies — the female subjects subconsciously projected the inner space of their wombs and vaginas, while the male subjects subconsciously projected the outer space their phalluses occupy. Young discredits this theory, and argues that women favored inner space, because that is where their bodies move in space.

In terms of limited mobility, Young writes that women often use and inhabit a smaller space than what is realistically available. For example, when a ball is thrown, a woman will "stay in one place and react to the balls motion only when it has arrived within the space where she is." The female spatiality is limited based on her limited perception of what she is physically capable of, if she were to be able to transcend her body's discontinued unity.

Because women are seemingly stuck within their inner spaces, they experience a double spatiality, in which there is a perceived difference between space "here" and "yonder." Young contends that women are positioned in space, while men can freely move through it. This further contributes to a woman viewing her own body as an object, because she does not have the autonomy to move her body freely to constitute actions, but rather she remains within her space and receives the action. Young demonstrates this assertion by referring back to her observations that women only use parts of their body to perform a task, while the rest remains immobile, stuck in its constricted space. This further proves her previous rejection of Erikson's conclusions; because a woman sees herself as rooted and enclosed in a space, "then on the reversibility assumption it would follow that visual space for feminine existence also has its closures of immobility and fixity."

=== Section IV: Implications, Understanding the Oppression of Women ===
Young concludes the paper with the assertion that these constraints are the result of living in a patriarchal, and sexist society. Women are not given the societal acceptance to take up as much space as men, and are taught from a young age to contain themselves in a small, enclosed, "inner space." Young girls are taught, both implicitly and explicitly, to follow the precedent of limited female spatiality and consequentially grow into "throwing like a girl." Once these girls have reached womanhood, they have embraced the conception that their bodies are fragile, and are both a subject and an object to be protected; women are aware that their bodies are seen as sexual objects by men, and that their bodies are objects receiving the male gaze. Young argues this further entrenches the discontinuity a woman has with her own body, as she fears that being outwardly direct will be perceived as an invitation to be objectified. She writes, "The woman lives her space as confined and enclosed around her at least in part as projecting some small area in which she can exist as a free subject."

While Young contends she has drawn sufficient conclusions on the modalities of feminine mobility, she introduces several questions that her paper raises. She questions how women perform differently than men in activities that do not require full-body movement, and in activities that do not have a clear goal, such as sex or dancing. Furthermore, Young questions how the constrained spatiality of the feminine body affects women's lives as a whole; she concludes with the suggestion that the lack of confidence women have about their physical abilities has resulted in their lack of confidence to be successful in cognitive or leadership abilities.

== Scholarly reception ==
This essay has become a classic in feminist theory for its attention to female experiences and embodiment. It has been praised for breaking radical new ground in philosophy and providing a strong foundation for performance and corporeality studies. Because of its popularity, it has been reprinted in several book-length collections of essays and features in the title (see Throwing Like a Girl and Other Essays in Feminist Philosophy and Social Theory (1990) and On Female Body Experience: 'Throwing Like a Girl' and Other Essays (2005)).

== Bibliography ==
- Al-Saji, Alia (2005). Review of On Female Body Experience: 'Throwing Like a Girl and Other Essays'. http://ndpr.nd.edu/news/24880-on-female-body-experience-throwing-like-a-girl-and-other-essays/
- Foster, Susan Leigh (2009). "Throwing Like a Girl, Dancing Like a Feminist Philosophy". In Dancing with Iris: The Philosophy of Iris Marion Young. Eds. Ann Ferguson and Mechthild Nagel. Available on Google Books.
- Young, Iris Marion (1980). "Throwing like a Girl: A Phenomenology of Feminine Body Comportment Motility and Spatiality". 3 (2): 137–156. Available on JSTOR.
