= Iris Marion Young =

American political theorist and feminist (1949–2006)

- Born: January 2, 1949; New York City, U.S.
- Died: August 1, 2006 (aged 57); Chicago, Illinois, U.S.
- Children: 1

Education
- Education: Queens College; Pennsylvania State University

Philosophical work
- Institutions: University of Pittsburgh; University of Chicago
- Main interests: Contemporary political theory, feminist social theory, and public policy

Iris Marion Young (2 January 1949 – 1 August 2006) was an American political theorist and socialist feminist who focused on the nature of justice and social difference. She served as Professor of Political Science at the University of Chicago and was affiliated with the Center for Gender Studies and the Human Rights program there. Her research covered contemporary political theory, feminist social theory, and normative analysis of public policy. She believed in the importance of political activism and encouraged her students to involve themselves in their communities.

== Early life ==
Young was born in New York City and studied philosophy and graduated with honors at Queens College. She was awarded a Master's degree and PhD in philosophy by Pennsylvania State University in 1974.

== Career ==
Before coming to the University of Chicago she taught political theory for nine years in the Graduate School of Public and International Affairs at the University of Pittsburgh, and before then taught philosophy at several institutions, including the Worcester Polytechnic Institute and Miami University. During the summer term of 1995 Young was a visiting professor of philosophy at the Johann Wolfgang Goethe University in Frankfurt, Germany. Young held visiting fellowships at several universities and institutes around the world, including the Institute for Advanced Study in Princeton, New Jersey, the Institute for Human Sciences in Vienna, the Australian National University, the University of Canterbury in New Zealand, and the Human Sciences Research Council of South Africa.

== Philosophical contributions ==
Young's interests ranged broadly, including contemporary theories of justice; democracy and difference; feminist political theory; continental political theory including Michel Foucault and Jürgen Habermas; ethics and international affairs; gender, race and public policy.

=== Social groups and the politics of difference ===
Central to Young's philosophy is the contention that concepts of justice were not limited to individual desert. Instead, the recognition of social groups was essential to redressing structural inequalities. Because the social rules, laws, and institutional routines constraining certain people constrain them as a group, and because our awareness of injustice almost universally compares classes of people rather than individuals directly, our evaluations of inequality and injustice must recognize the salience of social groups as constituent of a complete theory of justice.

Young's recognition of social groups impelled her to argue for a post-liberal "politics of difference," in which equal treatment of individuals does not override the redress of group-based oppression. Young contrasted her approach with contemporary liberal political philosophers like John Rawls and Ronald Dworkin, who she claims conflate the moral equivalence of people with procedural rules that treat all people equally.

=== Five faces of oppression ===
Among Young's most widely disseminated ideas is her model of the "five faces of oppression", first published in Justice and the Politics of Difference (1990), in which she presented a relational approach to the question of justice, based upon a group theory of oppression. Synthesizing feminist, queer, poststructuralist, and post-colonial critiques of classical Marxism, Young argued at least five distinct types of oppression could not be collapsed into more fundamental causes, and furthermore could not be reduced to dimensions of distributive justice. Her "five faces" are:

- Exploitation
- Marginalization
- Powerlessness
- Cultural domination
- Violence

=== Embodied phenomenology ===
One of Young's most well-known essays is "Throwing Like a Girl: A Phenomenology of Feminine Body Comportment Motility and Spatiality," first published in Human Studies (1980). In it she explores differences in feminine and masculine movement in the context of a gendered and embodied phenomenological perspective based on ideas from Simone de Beauvoir and Maurice Merleau-Ponty. She discusses how girls are socialized and conditioned to restrict their body movement and think of their bodies as fragile, which then has repercussions for their confidence in accomplishing tasks and goals later in life. The essay also serves as a critique and extension of Simone de Beauvoir's ideas of 'immanence' and 'transcendence'.

=== Structural injustice ===
One of Young's contributions, of particular importance to moral and political philosophy, global ethics and global justice are the concepts of structural injustice and its associated approach to responsibility: the social connection model. In an idea developed at length in Responsibility for Justice, a collection of Young's work published after her death as well as in several other writings, Young argues that structural (social) injustice "exists when social processes put large categories of persons under a systematic threat of domination or deprivation of the means to develop and exercise their capacities, at the same time as these processes enable others to dominate or have a wide range of opportunities for developing and exercising their capacities". Because most of us are implicated at some level in contributing to structural injustice, this also gives rise to what Young calls a social connection model of responsibility. In this model, we are to ask ourselves how agents and institutions are to think of themselves in relation to structural injustice. This is starkly contrasted with a 'liability for harm' model of responsibility, which is more focused on finding guilt, blame or fault for a particular harm. According to Young, the main reason why the liability model fails to address structural injustice is that structures are produced and reproduced by a large number of people acting within accepted norms, rules and practices, and so harm cannot always be traced back to the actions or motivations of particular individuals. The social connection model, in contrast, is forward-looking suggesting that all those who contribute through their actions to structural processes that result in injustice have a (political) responsibility to remedy that injustice. In this, she departs from and contrasts her approach to other political philosophers such as John Rawls and David Miller and the focus on distributive and statist approaches to justice, and draws much inspiration from Hannah Arendt's work.

Young applied her model of responsibility to a wide range of real-world scenarios, but perhaps most to global labour justice. For example, in connection to the unjust conditions of sweatshop labour, and the political responsibility of consumers in high income countries to remedy it. The social connection model has five main features. It is (1) Not isolating (unlike the liability model which seeks to define specific liable actors), it (2) judges the background conditions that other models would find normal or acceptable, it is (3) forward-looking not backward-looking, it is a model of (4) shared responsibilities, and it can only be (5) discharged through collective action (e.g. through community engagement rather than personal action).

== Later life ==
Young married David Alexander, and she gave birth to a daughter, Morgen Alexander-Young.

After an 18-month struggle with esophageal cancer, Young died at her home in the Hyde Park neighborhood of Chicago on 1 August 2006 at the age of 57.

== Memoriam activities ==
In recognition of her work with the Center for Gender Studies at the University of Chicago, the center's distinguished faculty lecture series was renamed in her honor in November 2006. In addition, the University of Pittsburgh Gender, Sexuality, and Women's Studies Program, in collaboration with the University of Pittsburgh Graduate School of Public and International Affairs, created the Iris Marion Young Award for Political Engagement in 2008 to honor Young's memory and to recognize faculty/staff, graduate, and undergraduate members of the university who impact the community.

Young was also honored at Penn State University through a series of gifts which created the Iris Marion Young Diversity Scholar Award as part of the association for Feminist Ethics and Social Theory's and the Rock Ethics Institute's Philosophy in an Inclusive Key Summer Institute. This Institute is designed to encourage undergraduate students from under-represented groups to consider future study in the field of philosophy. Students who are part of this summer institute are awarded the Iris Marion Young Diversity Award and their studies during the institute include her work.

In 2009, the Oxford University Press published an edited volume dedicated to Young's philosophy titled Dancing with Iris: The Philosophy of Iris Marion Young.

The American Political Science Association awards the Okin-Young Award in Feminist Political Theory, named in honor of Young and Susan Moller Okin.

== Selected bibliography ==
=== Books ===
- Young, Iris Marion; Allen, Jeffner (1989). The Thinking Muse: Feminism and Modern French Philosophy. Bloomington: Indiana University Press. ISBN 9780253205025.
- Young, Iris (1990). Justice and the Politics of Difference. Princeton, New Jersey: Princeton University Press. ISBN 9780691023151.
- Young, Iris (1997). Intersecting Voices: Dilemmas of Gender, Political Philosophy, and Policy. Princeton, New Jersey: Princeton University Press. ISBN 9780691012001.
- Young, Iris Marion; DiQuinzio, Patrice (1997). Feminist Ethics and Social Policy. Bloomington: Indiana University Press. ISBN 9780585025438.
- Young, Iris Marion; Jaggar, Alison (2000). A Companion to Feminist Philosophy. Malden, Massachusetts: Blackwell. ISBN 9780631227649.
- Young, Iris (2000). Inclusion and Democracy. Oxford New York: Oxford University Press. ISBN 9780198297550.
- Young, Iris (2002) [1990]. Throwing Like a Girl and Other Essays in Feminist Philosophy and Social Theory. Ann Arbor, Michigan: UMI Books on Demand. ISBN 9780608050478.
- Young, Iris Marion; Macedo, Stephen (2003). Child, Family, and State. New York: New York University Press. ISBN 9780814756829. (Conference proceedings)
- Young, Iris (2007). Global Challenges: War, Self Determination and Responsibility for Justice. Cambridge Malden, Massachusetts: Polity. ISBN 9780745638355.
- Young, Iris Marion; Shanley, Mary Lyndon; O'Neill, Daniel (2008). Illusion of Consent: Engaging with Carole Pateman. University Park, Pennsylvania: Pennsylvania State University Press. ISBN 9780271035918.
- Young, Iris (2011). Responsibility for Justice. Oxford New York: Oxford University Press. ISBN 9780199970957.
- Young, Iris Marion; Levy, Jacob T. (2011). Colonialism and Its Legacies. Lanham, Maryland: Lexington Books. ISBN 9780739142943.

=== Chapters in books ===
- Young, Iris (1981), “Beyond the Unhappy Marriage: A Critique of the Dual Systems Theory”, in Lydia Sargent (ed.), Women and Revolution: A Discussion of the Unhappy Marriage of Marxism and Feminism, Montréal: Black Rose Books.
- Young, Iris Marion (1995), "Gender as seriality: thinking about women as a social collective", in Brenner, Johanna; Laslett, Barbara; Arat, Yeşim (eds.), Rethinking the political: women, resistance, and the state, Chicago: University of Chicago Press, pp. 99–124, ISBN 9780226073996.
- Young, Iris Marion (2001), "Pushing for inclusion: Justice and the politics of difference", in Terchek, Ronald J.; Conte, Thomas C. (eds.), Theories of democracy: a reader, Lanham, Maryland: Rowman & Littlefield Publishers, pp. 268–278, ISBN 9780847697250.
- Young, Iris Marion (2005), "Five faces of oppression", in Cudd, Ann E.; Andreasen, Robin O. (eds.), Feminist theory: a philosophical anthology, Oxford, UK Malden, Massachusetts: Blackwell Publishing, pp. 91–104, ISBN 9781405116619.
- Young, Iris Marion (2005), "The logic of masculinist protection: reflections on the current security state", in Friedman, Marilyn (ed.), Women and citizenship, Studies in Feminist Philosophy, Oxford New York: Oxford University Press, pp. 15–34, ISBN 9780195175356.
- Young, Iris Marion (2006), "The complexities of coalition", in Burns, Lynda (ed.), Feminist alliances, Amsterdam New York: Rodopi, pp. 11–18, ISBN 9789042017283.

=== Articles ===
- Young, Iris Marion (1980). "Throwing Like a Girl: A Phenomenology of Feminine Body Comportment Motility and Spatiality". Human Studies 3 (2): 137–156. JSTOR 20008753.
- Young, Iris Marion (1985). "Humanism, gynocentrism and feminist politics". Women's Studies International Forum. 8 (3): 173–183. doi:10.1016/0277-5395(85)90040-8.
- Young, Iris Marion (January 1989). "Polity and Group Difference: A Critique of the Ideal of Universal Citizenship". Ethics. 99 (2): 250–274. doi:10.1086/293065. JSTOR 2381434. S2CID 54215809.
- Young, Iris Marion (Spring 1994). "Gender as Seriality: Thinking about Women as a Social Collective." Signs: Journal of Women in Culture and Society. University of Chicago Press. 19 (3): 713–738.
- Young, Iris Marion (1997). "On the politization of the social in recent western political theory". Filozofski vestnik. 18 (2): 153–176. OCLC 438842134.
- Archibugi, Daniele and Young, Iris Marion (2002) "Envisioning a Global Rule of Law", Eurozine, 14 June 2002.

Her writings have been translated into several languages, including German, Italian, Portuguese, Spanish, French, Swedish and Croatian, and she lectured widely in North America, Europe, Australia and South Africa.

== See also ==
- Seyla Benhabib
- Wendy Brown
- Anne Phillips
- Daniele Archibugi
- Will Kymlicka
- Charles Taylor
- Anthony Giddens
- Jean-Paul Sartre
- List of American philosophers
