= Nachgewahren =

"Nachgewahren" ("postdiscovering") is a Husserlian term referring to the way a lived experience is grasped and retained immediately after it occurs. It is a key component of phenomenological description and analysis since it involves memory and intentionality.

== See also ==
- Retention and protention
