= Jonathan Smith (psychologist) =

British psychologist

Jonathan Alan Smith
- Education: University of Oxford
- Scientific career
- Fields: Psychology, Health psychology, Qualitative psychological research
- Workplaces: University of Sheffield; Keele University; Birkbeck, University of London
- Thesis: Self construction : longitudinal studies in the psychology of personal identity and life transitions. (1990)

Jonathan Alan Smith is a British psychologist who has been very prominent in promoting qualitative research within social psychology and health psychology. In particular, he has developed and promoted a particular approach known as interpretative phenomenological analysis (IPA).

== Career ==
Smith achieved a DPhil in Psychology from the University of Oxford and then held lectureships at Keele and Sheffield Universities. He has at least 160 publications to his name.

== Awards and Distinctions ==
- Honorary Fellow, British Psychological Society
- Fellow, Academy of Social Sciences

== Works ==
- Smith, Jonathan A. (1995). "Repertory grids: An interactive, case-study perspective". In Smith, Jonathan A.; Harré, Rom; Langenhove, Luk Van (eds.). Rethinking methods in psychology. London: Sage Publications. ISBN 0-8039-7732-8.
- Smith, Jonathan A., ed. (2003). Qualitative psychology: A practical guide to research methods. London: Sage Publications. ISBN 0-7619-7230-7.
- Smith, Jonathan A.; Flowers, Paul; Larkin, Michael, eds. (2009). Interpretative phenomenological analysis: Theory, method and research. London: Sage Publications. ISBN 978-1-4129-0833-7.

== See also ==
- Phenomenological psychology
- Qualitative psychological research
