= Julius Thomas Fraser =

Hungarian-American writer (1923–2010)

- Born: May 7, 1923; Budapest, Hungary
- Died: November 20, 2010 (aged 87); Westport, Connecticut

Philosophical work
- Era: 20th-century philosophy
- Region: Western philosophy
- Main interests: Time, temporality
- Notable ideas: Chronosophy

Julius Thomas Fraser (May 7, 1923 – November 20, 2010) was a Hungarian-born American author who made important scholarly contributions to the interdisciplinary study of time and was a founding member of the International Society for the Study of Time (ISST). He was the editor of the seminal volume Voices of Time - A Cooperative Survey of Man's Views of Time as Expressed by the Sciences and by the Humanities (1966) and founding editor of KronoScope Journal in the Study of Time. His work has strongly influenced thinking about the nature of time across the disciplines from physics to sociology, biology to comparative religion, and he was a seminal figure in the general interdisciplinary study of temporality. His work has influenced the work of poet Frederick Turner and author David Mitchell.

== Biography ==
Born and raised in Hungary, Fraser was not drafted into the military on account of his partial Jewish heritage. Following the Second World War, he emigrated to the United States. Working as an engineer and an inventor for several years, he registered at least seven US patents between 1958 and 1963. However, he already began to think about the nature of time much earlier, as early as 1945. His early training had been in physics, but he completed his Ph.D. in 1969 in the Fakultät für Geistes- und Staatswissenschaften (Faculty of Social and Political Sciences) at the University of Hannover, and his dissertation was entitled: Time as a Hierarchy of Creative Conflicts. Although this work provided a template for many of his later investigations, he had already touched on many of the core ideas in his first articles in 1966, the same year that he founded the International Society for the Study of Time.

Fraser authored and edited many papers over the next several decades, but following the success of his 1966 edited volume of interdisciplinary articles, The Voices of Time, which remains a regularly cited classic of time studies, he oversaw editing and publication of the first ten volumes of "The Study of Time" series through the International Society for the Study of Time. Subsequent contributions include his role as a founding editor of the interdisciplinary Journal KronoScope.

Fraser died on November 20, 2010, in his home in Westport, Connecticut, which he shared with his wife, Jane, his five children and six grandchildren.

== Central themes in his writings ==
Throughout his many works, two themes stand out centrally:

1. The Hierarchical Theory of Time
2. The Theory of Time as Conflict

Much of his work is an interplay between these themes, whether played out in disciplinary theatres of the sciences, the arts, the humanities, and history, or as a bridging principle between fields of enquiry themselves. Arguably, the distinction between disciplines as diverse as those that epistemically belong in the natural and human spheres of knowledge find their methodological and definitional norms informed by his hierarchical theory of time. Indeed, his work fits into the emerging cosmic evolution paradigm, describing as it does how each level of reality emerges, and how that newly emergent level experiences time.

Fraser posits that the universe has emerged into levels of temporality, beginning with the pure energy of the Big Bang, which he terms atemporality (without-time). As the universe cooled, the quantum physical universe emerged, giving rise to probabilistic prototemporality. With the emergence of molecules and macrophysical objects, we get deterministic eotemporality. The emergence of living things gives rise to a more forward direction of time experience, or biotemporality, which is followed by the strongly directional time experience of human beings, or nootemporality. Fraser then goes on to posit that a sociotemporality has since emerged. Fraser posits that as each level of complexity in the universe encounters unresolvable paradoxes, a new level of complexity emerges, with its own paradoxes.

These nested levels (umwelts) represent qualitatively different temporalities, for both time and the perception of time have evolved. In one sense, time is physically different from what it was when the universe first came into being. As the universe continues to change, so too does time change. In the humanistic sense, it is the perception of time that has changed, as humans have biologically evolved with different concepts of the world to those of our ancestral species.

This biological evolution, and the different perceptions of time that it implies, are played out in every moment in our brain. Our brain functions in one sense as a unitary organ, but evolutionarily it contains different brains: one that controls autonomic function, one that perceives the world in the moment, and one that understands the world intellectually. By this understanding, the biological self that understands only the moment is in perpetual conflict with the intellectual self that conceives of past, present, future, and the possibility of eternity. This, then, at its root is the conflict that underlies the tension of time felt and time understood. People can never resolve the fact that we live in the moment, but dream of the eternal.

Fraser builds his reasoning on an interpretation of the nature of time that permits a novel understanding of the dynamics of human values. He shows that seeking the true, doing what is right, and admiring what is beautiful, far from promoting permanence, continuity, and balance in individual and social affairs, actually perpetuate the chronic insecurity of the time-knowing species and drive its remarkable creativity and frightening destructiveness. For example, let truth as a human value be defined as the recognition of permanence in reality. Its historical function has been the creation of conflicts and, through them, social, cultural, and personal change. Likewise if the quality of a feeling is such as to make one desire its perpetuation, then whatever is believed to be responsible for it is said to be beautiful. Of course the opposite is said to be ugly. The historical function of beauty has again been the creation of conflicts and consequent change.

Fraser's ideas have consequences not only for our understanding of the physical universe, but also of the emergence of the human mind (a parallel model of which was developed by the psychologist Clare W. Graves in his model of psychosocial emergence) and for culture and the arts. For example, Fraser posits that in literature tragedy is the purest expression of the universe's emergent temporality. Human values are instructions whose purpose is that of keeping alive the unresolvable, creative conflicts of the strange walker.

The theory of time as conflict - nested hierarchy of unresolvable conflicts. These nested levels represent qualitatively different temporalities, for both time and the perception of time have evolved. In one sense, time is physically different from what it was when the universe first came into being.

atemporal - blank sheet of paper, objects travelling at speed of light, black hole/Big Bang, causation has no meaning

prototemporal - fragmented shaft of an arrow, particle-waves travelling at less than speed of light, instants may be specified only statistically, probabilistic causation joins prototemporal events

eotemporal - shaft of an arrow, countable and orderable without a preferred direction, nowless time, physical matter, time orientable but not time oriented, deterministic causation joins eotemporal events

biotemporal - short arrow, future, past, present, limited temporal horizons, organic present, simultaneities of necessity, organic intentionality directed toward concrete goals and serving the continuity of the organism's life, multiple and final causation, rigid programming gives way to dynamic programming

nootemporal - long straight arrow, "You'll come to me out of the long ago", intentionality directed towards concrete or symbolic goals, serving continued integrity of the self, human actions are connected through symbolic causes known as ideas, the possibility of choice among ideas and corresponding actions is known as human freedom, ideas can produce responses to imaginary challenges

sociotemporal - A society is a group of people with a family of conflicts that defines them and distinguishes them from other societies. man has capacity to change social institutions in response to symbolic causes

== Books ==
Books that he has authored include:

- 1966, The Voices of Time: A Cooperative Survey of Man's Views of Time as Expressed by the Sciences and by the Humanities
- 1975, Of Time, Passion, and Knowledge
- 1978, Time as Conflict: a Scientific and Humanistic Study
- 1982, The Genesis and Evolution of Time: a Critique of Interpretation in Physics
- 1987, Time the Familiar Stranger
- 1999, Time, Conflict, and Human Values
- 2007, Time and Time Again: Reports from a Boundary of the Universe

== See also ==
- Philosophy of space and time
- Powers of Ten, a 1977 film in which a Fraser book makes a brief appearance
- Temporality
- Chronosophy
