= International Society for the Study of Time =

The International Society for the Study of Time (ISST) is an interdisciplinary organization of professional scientists, humanists, and artists. Established by J. T. Fraser in 1966, society members study and explore the multiple dimensions and perspectives of time across the disciplines – the role time plays in the physical, organic, intellectual, and social worlds. Many (but by no means all) discussions within ISST revolve around fundamental questions such as:

- Can the structure of spacetime in physics be reconciled with the human experience of the passage of time?
- Can we integrate different temporal scales and complexities in a coherent theory of time?
- How do memory and narrative organize human experience and expectations in politics and culture?
- How do we reconcile the speed of contemporary societies with the human need for stability?
- Can conceptions of a deep past and a vast future help us to foster the spirit of ethical responsibility?

Pursuing its mission to foster the interdisciplinary study of time, the ISST produces two peer-reviewed publications in association with Brill Publishers: a journal, KronoScope, and a series of volumes, The Study of Time, comprising papers selected from triennial conferences. The Society also publishes an aperiodical news letter, Time's News.

== History ==
The ISST was founded in 1966 and held its first meeting in 1969 at the Mathematisches Forschunginstitut, Oberwolfach, West Germany; August 31-September 6, 1969. The first officers were Gerald James Whitrow, University of London-Mathematics (President); Julius Thomas Fraser, The Study of Time (Secretary); M. Satoshi Watanabe, Yale University-Physics (Treasurer). While it took four years to mount the next conference beside Lake Yamanaka in Japan (July 3–8, 1973), conferences have taken place roughly every three years at different sites around the globe. Time is a fundamental feature of the physical universe and it is intimately connected with any life process. The passage of time has been of concern to all great religions and philosophies, and has found an infinite variety of expressions in the arts. No other single aspect of reality relates more directly to basic human needs and desires. The mission of the ISST is to support studies of time and to foster the cross-disciplinary exchange and pollination of ideas.

== Conferences ==
Every three years, the ISST sponsors a themed conference for the exchange of ideas among its members. Themes encompass topics such as Time and Memory (Cambridge University, UK), Time, Order and Chaos (St. Adèle Canada), Origins and Futures (Monteverde, Costa Rica), Time: Limits and Constraints (Asilomar, USA), Time and Uncertainty (Castello di Gargonza, Italy). The diversity of approaches presented provides rich and fertile ground for discussion, debate, and insight. Although multidisciplinary, panels of speakers are clustered into thematic groupings, and plenty of time is left for questions and an exchange of views. In 2016, Time and Urgency will be the theme of a conference at the University of Edinburgh, 26 June-2 July. The Society encourages convivial discussion by selecting intimate and inspiring locations for the conferences. Conferees typically attend all lectures, and enjoy their coffee breaks and meals together. An optional and organized day-long excursion is traditionally offered mid-conference. ISST also co-sponsors interim conferences in collaboration with other academic organizations. Recent events have included: Time’s Excesses & Eccentricities (University of Caen, France); Time and Emergence (École normale supérieure, Paris, France); and Time and Change in China and the West (Beijing Normal University).

=== Past Conferences ===
- 1969: First Conference: Mathematisches Forschunginstitut, Oberwolfach, Federal Republic of Germany; August 31-September 6.
- 1973: Second Conference: Lake Yamanaka, Japan; July 3–8.
- 1976: Third Conference: Alpbach, Austria; July 1–10.
- 1979: Fourth Conference: “Beginnings and Endings”; Alpbach, Austria; July 1–10.
- 1983: Fifth Conference: “Time, Science, and Society in China and the West”; Castello di Gargonza, Monte San Savino, Italy; July 3–9.
- 1986: Sixth Conference: “Time and Mind”; Dartington Hall College, Totnes, England; July 4–11.
- 1989: Seventh Conference: “Time and Process: Interdisciplinary Issues”; Glacier Park Lodge, Glacier National Park, United States; July 9–15.
- 1992: Eighth Conference: “Dimensions of Time and Life”; Centre Culturel International de Cerisy-la-Salle, France; July 3–9.
- 1995: Ninth Conference: “Time, Order, Chaos”; Saint-Adèle, Québec, Canada; July 2–8.
- 1998: Tenth Conference: “Time at the Millenium: Changes and Continuities”; Evangelische Akademie Tutzing, Germany; July 5–11.
- 2001: Eleventh Conference: “Time and Uncertainty”; Castello di Gargonza, Monte San Savino, Italy; July 1–7.
- 2004: Twelfth Conference: “Time and Memory”; Clare College, University of Cambridge, United Kingdom; July 25–31.
- 2007: Thirteenth Conference: “Time: Limits and Constraints”; Asilomar Conference Center, Pacific Grove, California, United States; July 28-August 3.
- 2010: Fourteenth Conference: “Time: Origins and Futures”; El Establo Conference Center, Monteverde, Costa Rica. July 25–31.
- 2013: Fifteenth Conference: “Time and Trace”; Orthodox Academy of Crete, Greece; June 30-July 6.
- 2016: Sixteenth Conference: "Time's Urgency"; University of Edinburgh, UK; June 26-July 2.
- 2019: Seventeenth Conference: "Time in Variance"; Loyola Marymount University, Los Angeles, California, United States; June 23–29

=== Forthcoming Conferences ===
- 2023 : Eighteenth conference: 'Time and Measure', held at Yamaguchi university
- 2024 : Nineteenth conference: Nottingham university

== Study of Time: Conference Volumes ==
- Time and Trace: Multidisciplinary Investigations of Temporality (The Study of Time XV). Publisher: Brill, Leiden-Boston, 2016 ISBN 9789004315624 Editors: Ostovich, Gross
- Origins and Futures: Time Inflected and Reflected (The Study of Time XIV). Publisher: Brill, Leiden-Boston, 2013 ISBN 9789004251687 Editor: Steineck, Clausius
- Limits and Constraints (The Study of Time XIII). Publisher: Brill, Leiden-Boston, 2010 ISBN 9789004185753 Editor: Parker, Harris, Steineck
- Time and Memory (The Study of Time XII). Publisher: Brill, Leiden-Boston, 2007 ISBN 9789004154278 Editor: Crawford, Harris, Parker
- Time and Uncertainty (The Study of Time XI). Publisher: Brill, Leiden-Boston, 2004 ISBN 90-04-13811-0 Editor: Harris & Crawford
- Time: Perspectives at the Millennium (The Study of Time X). Publisher: Bergin & Garvey, Westport, 2001 ISBN 0-89789-641-6 Editor: Soulsby and Fraser
- Time, Order, Chaos (The Study of Time IX). Publisher: Madison, CT: International Universities Press, 1998 ISBN 9780823665471 Editor: Fraser, Soulsby, and Argyros
- Dimensions of Time and Life (The Study of Time VIII). Publisher: Madison, CT: International Universities Press, 1996 ISBN 978-0823612956 Editor: Fraser and Soulsby
- Time and Process (The Study of Time VII). Publisher: Madison, CT: International Universities Press, 1992 ISBN 9780823665440 Editor: Fraser and Rowell
- Time and Mind (The Study of Time VI). Publisher: Madison, CT: International Universities Press, 1989 ISBN 9780823665426 Editor: Fraser and Soulsby
- Time, Science, and Society in China and the West (The Study of Time V). Publisher: Amherst: University of Massachusetts Press, 1986 ISBN 9780870234958 Editor: Fraser, Lawrence, and Haber
- The Study of Time IV. Publisher: New York: Springer-Verlag, 1981 ISBN 9781461259497 Editor: Fraser, Lawrence, Park
- The Study of Time III. Publisher: New York: Springer-Verlag, 1978 ISBN 97814612-62893 Editors: Fraser, Lawrence, Park
- The Study of Time II. Publisher: New York: Springer-Verlag, 1975 ISBN 9783642501210 Editors: Fraser, Lawrence
- The Study of Time I. Publisher: New York: Springer-Verlag, 1972 ISBN 9783642653872 Editors: Fraser, Haber, Müller
