= Phenomenology (psychology) =

Utilisation of analytic tools from phenomenology to study the human psyche

Phenomenology or phenomenological psychology, a sub-discipline of psychology, is the scientific study of subjective experiences. It is an approach to psychological subject matter that attempts to explain experiences from the point of view of the subject via the analysis of their written or spoken words. The approach has its roots in the phenomenological philosophical work of Edmund Husserl.

== History ==
Early phenomenologists such as Husserl, Jean-Paul Sartre, and Maurice Merleau-Ponty conducted philosophical investigations of consciousness in the early 20th century. Their critiques of psychologism and positivism later influenced at least two main fields of contemporary psychology: the phenomenological psychological approach of the Duquesne School (the descriptive phenomenological method in psychology), including Amedeo Giorgi and Frederick Wertz; Scott D. Churchill, a Duquesne-trained phenomenologist, has applied descriptive methods to emotional experience, imagination, and intersubjectivity; and the experimental approaches associated with Francisco Varela, Shaun Gallagher, Evan Thompson, and others (embodied mind thesis). Other names associated with the movement include Jonathan Smith (interpretative phenomenological analysis), Steinar Kvale, and Wolfgang Köhler. But "an even stronger influence on psychopathology came from Heidegger (1963), particularly through Kunz (1931), Blankenburg (1971), Tellenbach (1983), Binswanger (1994), and others." Phenomenological psychologists have also figured prominently in the history of the humanistic psychology movement.

== Methodology ==
Phenomenology is concerned with the rich qualitative description of first-person experiences. This stands in contrast to quantitative approaches which seek to operationalize, abstract and predict behavior. Following Husserl's battle-cry "back to the things themselves", a phenomenological approach seeks to avoid speculation about underlying causes, and instead emphasizes direct descriptions of phenomena, whether by means of introspection or by attentive observation of another person.

=== Experience ===
The experiencing subject can be considered to be the person or self, for purposes of convenience. In phenomenological philosophy (and in particular in the work of Husserl, Heidegger, and Merleau-Ponty), "experience" is a considerably more complex concept than it is usually taken to be in everyday use. Instead, experience (or being, or existence itself) is an "in-relation-to" phenomenon, and it is defined by qualities of directedness, embodiment, and worldliness, which are evoked by the term "Being-in-the-World".

The quality or nature of a given experience is often referred to by the term qualia, whose archetypical exemplar is "redness". For example, we might ask, "Is my experience of redness the same as yours?" While it is difficult to answer such a question in any concrete way, the concept of intersubjectivity is often used as a mechanism for understanding how it is that humans are able to empathize with one another's experiences, and indeed to engage in meaningful communication about them. The phenomenological formulation of "Being-in-the-World", where person and world are mutually constitutive, is central here.

The observer, or in some cases the interviewer, achieves this sense of understanding and feeling of relatedness to the subject's experience, through subjective analysis of the experience, and the implied thoughts and emotions that they relay in their words.

=== Challenges in studying subjectivity ===
The philosophical psychology prevalent before the end of the 19th century relied heavily on introspection. The speculations concerning the mind based on those observations were criticized by the pioneering advocates of a more scientific and objective approach to psychology, such as William James and the behaviorists Edward Thorndike, Clark Hull, John B. Watson, and B. F. Skinner. However, not everyone agrees that introspection is intrinsically problematic, such as Francisco Varela, who has trained experimental participants in the structured "introspection" of phenomenological reduction.

In the early 1970s, Amedeo Giorgi applied phenomenological theory to his development of the Descriptive Phenomenological Method in Psychology. He sought to overcome certain problems he perceived from his work in psychophysics by approaching subjective phenomena from the traditional hypothetical-deductive framework of the natural sciences. Giorgi hoped to use what he had learned from his natural science background to develop a rigorous qualitative research method. His goal was to ensure that phenomenological research was both reliable and valid and he did this by seeking to make its processes increasingly measurable.

Philosophers have long confronted the problem of "qualia". Few philosophers believe that it is possible to be sure that one person's experience of the "redness" of an object is the same as another person's, even if both persons had effectively identical genetic and experiential histories. In principle, the same difficulty arises in feelings (the subjective experience of emotion), in the experience of effort, and especially in the "meaning" of concepts. As a result, many qualitative psychologists have claimed phenomenological inquiry to be essentially a matter of "meaning-making" and thus a question to be addressed by interpretive approaches.

== Applications ==
=== Psychotherapy ===
Carl Rogers's person-centered psychotherapy theory is based directly on the "phenomenal field" personality theory of Combs and Snygg. That theory in turn was grounded in phenomenological thinking. Rogers attempts to put a therapist in closer contact with a person by listening to the person's report of their recent subjective experiences, especially emotions of which the person is not fully aware. For example, in relationships the problem at hand is often not based around what actually happened but, instead, based on the perceptions and feelings of each individual in the relationship. "At the core of phenomenology lies the attempt to describe and understand phenomena such as caring, healing, and wholeness as experienced by individuals who have lived through them".

=== Recent applications ===
The study and practice of phenomenology continues to grow and develop today. In 2021 a study on the experiences of individuals who attended a coexistence center (CECO) was conducted using phenomenological interviews to understand the lives of the participants. After the interviews the researchers constructed a comprehensive narrative, putting their understanding of the participants experience into their own words. This process led the researchers to understand that "the CECO is a propitious space for the development of individual and collective potentialities and the valuation of constructive social relationships that facilitate and preserve the inherent tendency of people towards growth, autonomy and psychological maturation."

Another example of phenomenology in recent years is an article published in 2022 which explains how phenomenology can grow into a larger field of study if we recognize how phenomenology has the ability to make the experiences of other people more clear, bridging the gap between subjective and objective reality. It puts forth "a methodological concept of phenomenological elucidation to promote the development of phenomenology as psychology."

== Critiques ==
In 2022 Gerhard Thonhauser published an article which critiques phenomenology in psychology for adoption of Le Bon's crowd psychology, as well as what Thonhauser calls the "disease model of emotion transfer". Thonhauser claims there is little to no evidence of Le Bon's crowd psychology framework, which phenomenology relies on.

== See also ==
- Alterity
- Association of ideas
- Associationism
- Binding problem
- Ideology
- Neurophenomenology
- Prejudice
- Stream of consciousness (psychology)
- Vertiginous question
