= Phenomenology of Perception =

1945 book by Maurice Merleau-Ponty

- Cover of the first edition
- Author: Maurice Merleau-Ponty
- Original title: Phénoménologie de la perception
- Translator: Colin Smith (1st English translation); Donald Landes (2nd English translation)
- Language: French
- Subject: Perception
- Publisher: Éditions Gallimard, Routledge & Kegan Paul
- Publication date: 1945
- Publication place: France
- English publication date: 1962
- Media type: Print (Hardcover and Paperback)
- Pages: 466 (1965 Routledge edition)
- ISBN: 978-0415834339 (2012 Routledge edition)

Phenomenology of Perception (French: Phénoménologie de la perception) is a 1945 book about perception by the French philosopher Maurice Merleau-Ponty, in which the author expounds his thesis of "the primacy of perception". The work established Merleau-Ponty as the pre-eminent philosopher of the body, and is considered a major statement of French existentialism.

== Summary ==
Merleau-Ponty attempts to define phenomenology, which according to him has not yet received a proper definition. He asserts that phenomenology contains a series of apparent contradictions, which include the fact that it attempts to create a philosophy that would be a rigorous science while also offering an account of space, time and the world as people experience them. Merleau-Ponty denies that such contradictions can be resolved by distinguishing between the views of the philosopher Edmund Husserl and those of the philosopher Martin Heidegger, commenting that Heidegger's Being and Time (1927) "springs from an indication given by Husserl and amounts to no more than an explicit account of the 'natürlicher Weltbegriff' or the 'Lebenswelt' which Husserl, toward the end of his life, identified as the central theme of phenomenology, with the result that the contradiction appears in Husserl's own philosophy".

Following Husserl, Merleau-Ponty attempts to reveal the phenomenological structure of perception. He writes that while the "notion of sensation ... seems immediate and obvious", it is in fact confused. Merleau-Ponty asserts that because "traditional analyses" have accepted it, they have "missed the phenomenon of perception." Merleau-Ponty argues that while sensation could be understood to mean "the way in which I am affected and the experiencing of a state of myself", there is nothing in experience corresponding to "pure sensation" or "an atom of feeling". He writes that, "The alleged self-evidence of sensation is not based on any testimony of consciousness, but on widely held prejudice." Merleau-Ponty's central thesis is that of the "primacy of perception." He critiques the Cartesian stance of "cogito ergo sum" and expounds a different conception of consciousness. Cartesian dualism of mind and body is called into question as the primary way of existing in the world, and is ultimately rejected in favor of an intersubjective conception or dialectical and intentional concept of consciousness. The body is central to Merleau-Ponty's account of perception. In his view, the ability to reflect comes from a pre-reflective ground that serves as the foundation for reflecting on actions.

Merleau-Ponty's account of the body helps him undermine what had been a long-standing conception of consciousness, which hinges on the distinction between the for-itself (subject) and in-itself (object), which plays a central role in the philosophy of Jean-Paul Sartre, whose Being and Nothingness was released in 1943. The body stands between this fundamental distinction between subject and object, ambiguously existing as both. In Merleau-Ponty's discussion of human sexuality, he discusses psychoanalysis. Merleau-Ponty suggests that the body "can symbolize existence because it brings it into being and actualizes it."

== Publication history ==
Phenomenology of Perception was first published in 1945 by Éditions Gallimard. In 1962, an English translation by Colin Smith was published by Routledge & Kegan Paul. In 2013, Routledge published an English translation by Donald Landes.

== Reception ==
The philosopher A. J. Ayer criticized Merleau-Ponty's arguments against the sense datum theory of perception, finding them inconclusive. He considered Merleau-Ponty's inclusion of a chapter on sexuality surprising, suggesting that Merleau-Ponty included it to give him an opportunity to revisit the Hegelian dialectic of the master and the slave. He compared Merleau-Ponty's views on sex to those of Sartre in Being and Nothingness. The sociologist Murray S. Davis observed that Merleau-Ponty's view that aspects of psychoanalysis, such as its attribution of meaning to all human actions and the diffusing of sexuality throughout the whole of human existence, are similar to phenomenology is controversial, and that other authors would view psychoanalysis as "materialistic and mechanical".

Helmut R. Wagner described Phenomenology of Perception as an important contribution to phenomenology. Rhiannon Goldthorpe called the book Merleau-Ponty's major work, noting that its discussion of subjects such as the relationship of the body to spatial experience, and sexuality, went beyond "the nominal range of his title." The philosopher David Abram observed that while "the sensible thing" is "commonly considered by our philosophical tradition to be passive and inert", Merleau-Ponty consistently describes it in the active voice in Phenomenology of Perception. He rejected the idea that Merleau-Ponty's "animistic" language was the result of poetic license, arguing that he "writes of the perceived things as entities, of sensible qualities as powers, and of the sensible itself as a field of animate presences, in order to acknowledge and underscore their active, dynamic contribution to perceptual experience."

American vice president Al Gore, in a 1998 interview with the critic Louis Menand in The New Yorker, mentioned Phenomenology of Perception as an inspiration. The philosopher Stephen Priest commented that, following the book's publication, Merleau-Ponty decided that in it he had taken "subject-object dualism as phenomenologically primitive" and "made use of a comparatively superficial psychologistic vocabulary" that he wished to replace. The philosopher Robert Bernasconi observed that the book established Merleau-Ponty as the pre-eminent philosopher of the body, and along with Merleau-Ponty's other writings, found a more receptive audience among analytic philosophers than the works of other phenomenologists.

G. B. Madison observed that the book was recognized as a major statement of French existentialism, and is best known for Merleau-Ponty's central thesis of "the primacy of perception". According to Madison, Merleau-Ponty sought to respond in his later work to the charge that by grounding all intellectual and cultural acquisitions in the prereflective and prepersonal life of the body, he was promoting reductionism and anti-intellectualism and undermining the ideals of reason and truth. Madison further stated that some commentators believed that Merleau-Ponty's thought had taken a significantly different direction in his late, unfinished work The Visible and the Invisible, edited by the philosopher Claude Lefort, while others emphasized the continuity of his work, with the issue receiving "much scholarly discussion".
