= Stephen Priest =

British philosopher (born 1954)

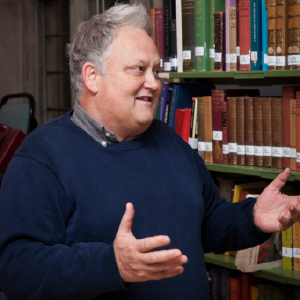
- Born: 22 August 1954 (age 72)
- Spouse: Kerry Priest

Education
- Education: University of Cambridge (BA, MA)

Philosophical work
- Era: Contemporary philosophy
- Region: Western philosophy
- School: Analytic philosophy Continental philosophy
- Notable students: Benedikt Paul Göcke
- Main interests: Metaphysics, philosophy of mind, phenomenology, history of philosophy, philosophy of religion
- Website: https://www.philosophy.ox.ac.uk/people/stephen-priest

Stephen Martin Priest (born 22 August 1954) is a British philosopher. He is a Senior Research Fellow in Philosophy at Blackfriars, Oxford and a member of the Faculty of Philosophy of the University of Oxford. He is also a member of Wolfson College, Oxford and Hughes Hall, Cambridge. Priest has held visiting professorships in the United States, Europe and Asia, and is best known for bringing the methods of analytic philosophy to Continental thinkers including Hegel, Husserl, Sartre and Merleau-Ponty.

== Biography ==
Priest obtained a BA in history with French and Archaeology at Lancaster University in 1976 followed by a PGCE in History with Social Sciences at the same university in 1978. Following this, Priest obtained a BA in philosophy at the University of Cambridge in 1980, receiving the MA in 1984. In 1977 Priest worked as an administrator for the Press and Information Department, Council of Europe, Strasbourg. From 1981 to 1989, Priest held lectureships at the Universities of Manchester, Bradford and Leeds as well as a Fellowship in Philosophy and Public Affairs, Salzburg Seminar in American Studies, Salzburg in 1986. From 1989 to 2000, Priest was Lecturer, Senior Lecturer, and finally Reader in Philosophy, at the University of Edinburgh. In 2000 Priest was appointed Senior Research Fellow in Philosophy at Blackfriars, Oxford and a member of the Faculty of Philosophy of the University of Oxford. He is married to the poet Kerry Priest.

== Publications ==
Stephen Priest is author or editor of nineteen books focusing mainly on Kant and the post-Kantian Continental tradition, the history of philosophy, and the philosophy of mind. He is also author of many articles on these and other themes. His work has been translated into Japanese, Korean, Macedonian, Russian and Spanish. Priest's publications include:

=== Books authored ===
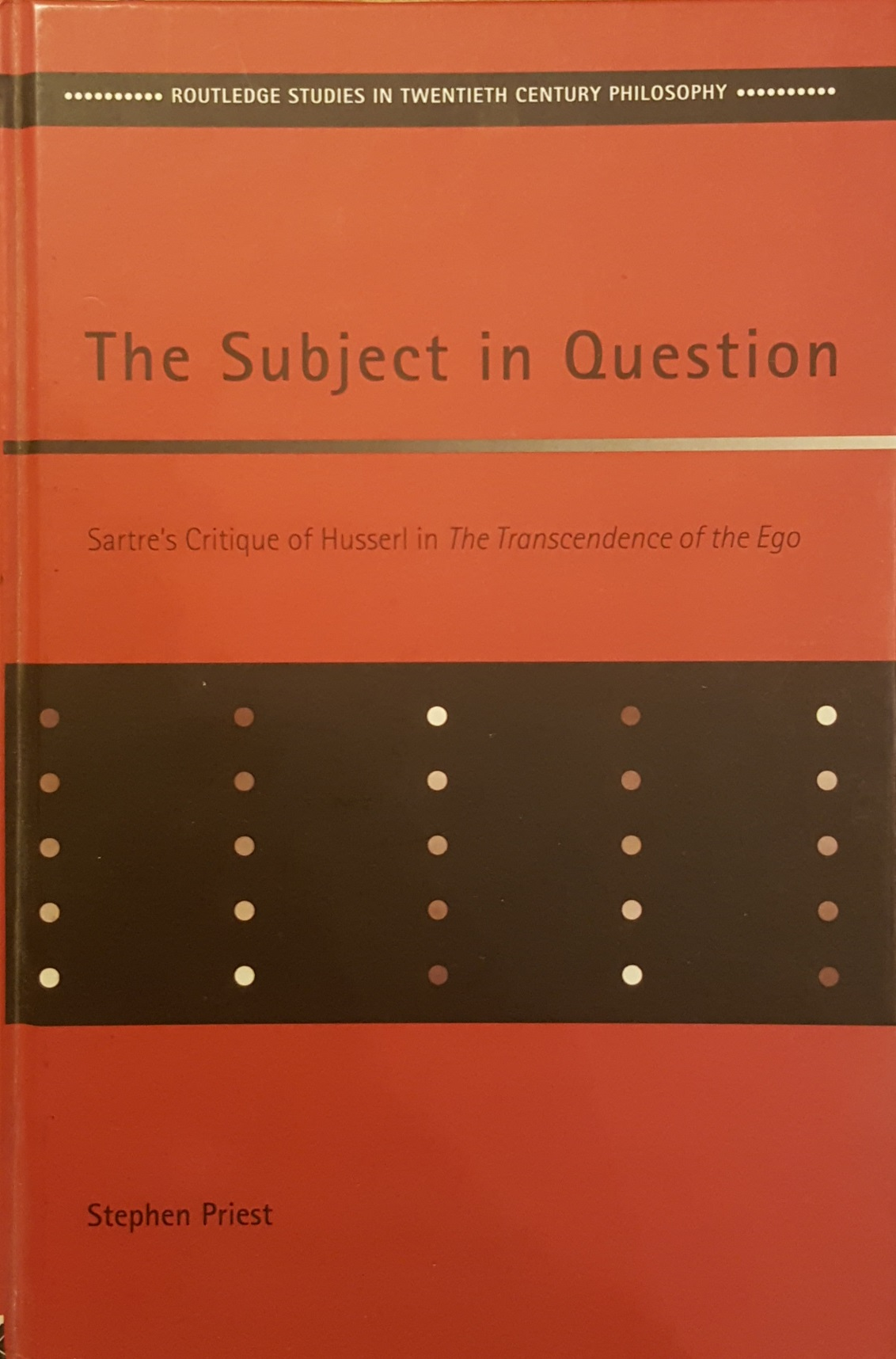
Stephen Priest, The Subject in Question

- The British Empiricists (London: Penguin Books, 1990), (Second Edition: London & New York: Routledge, 2007)
- Theories of the Mind (London: Penguin Books & Boston, MA: Houghton Mifflin, 1991)
- Merleau-Ponty ‘The Arguments of the Philosophers’ (Routledge, 1998, 2003)
- The Subject in Question (Routledge, 2000)

=== Books edited ===
- Hegel's Critique of Kant (ed.) (Oxford: Oxford University Press, 1987)
- Jean-Paul Sartre: Basic Writings (ed.) (London: Routledge, 2001)
- A Dictionary of Philosophy (ed.) with Antony Flew (London: Macmillan, 2002)

== Philosophical Questions: Theological Answers ==
In the 2000s Priest's thought turned to the relationship between philosophy and theology. In April 2008 a symposium took place at the Faculty of Philosophy of the University of Oxford on an unpublished manuscript by Priest entitled 'Philosophical Questions: Theological Answers'. As of January 2020 'Philosophical Questions: Theological Answers' has not been published. However, Priest has delivered talks on the relationship between philosophy and theology at numerous events, some of which can be watched online. In October 2011, Priest was one of three speakers asked to stand in for Richard Dawkins at an event at the Sheldonian Theatre, Oxford where Dawkins refused to debate philosopher and theologian, William Lane Craig. A video of this event can be viewed at Craig's website, Reasonable Faith.
