= Inclusion and Democracy =

- Author: Iris Marion Young
- Language: English
- Subject: Political philosophy, Feminist philosophy
- Genre: Nonfiction
- Publisher: Oxford University Press
- Publication date: 2002
- Publication place: United Kingdom
- Media type: Print
- Pages: 320
- ISBN: 978-0-19-829755-0
- Preceded by: Intersecting Voices: Dilemmas of Gender, Political Philosophy, and Policy
- Followed by: On Female Body Experience: 'Throwing Like a Girl' and Other Essays

Inclusion and Democracy is a 2002 book by Iris Marion Young, published by Oxford University Press. In the book, Young considers democracy in a multicultural society, and recommends paths to more inclusive engagement in democratic politics.
