= Jacob T. Levy =

American political theorist

- Occupation: Political theorist

Academic background
- Education: Phillips Exeter Academy Brown University (B.A. in Political Science)Princeton University (M.A., Ph.D. in Politics) University of Chicago Law School (LL.M.)

Academic work
- Discipline: Political Theory
- Institutions: McGill University Niskanen Center (Senior Fellow) Institute for Humane Studies (Senior Fellow)
- Notable works: The Multiculturalism of Fear Rationalism, Pluralism, and Freedom

Jacob T. Levy is an American political theorist and Tomlinson Professor of Political Theory at McGill University. Levy is the coordinator of McGill's Research Group on Constitutional Studies and was the founding director of McGill's Yan P. Lin Centre for the Study of Freedom and Global Orders in the Ancient and Modern Worlds. Levy is also a Senior Fellow at the Niskanen Center and the Institute for Humane Studies. He is known for his expertise on multiculturalism, liberalism, and pluralism.

== Education ==
Levy is an alumnus of Phillips Exeter Academy and holds a B.A. in Political Science from Brown University, an M.A. and Ph.D. in Politics from Princeton University, and an LL.M. from the University of Chicago Law School.

== Thought ==
=== Multiculturalism ===
Levy is one of the foremost experts on the political theory of multiculturalism. In his book The Multiculturalism of Fear, Levy argues that a political theory of multiculturalism must be primarily concerned neither with celebrating ethnic identities nor with overcoming them, but with reducing dangers such as state violence toward cultural minorities and war between ethnic groups. Levy's influential argument draws on the work of Judith Shklar, who famously argued that the primary concern of liberalism is to explain how the evils of cruelty and terror can be averted. Levy shares Shklar's emphasis on averting cruelty and terror in his approach to multiculturalism.

=== Rationalism, Pluralism, and Freedom ===
Levy's book Rationalism, Pluralism, and Freedom examines two approaches to the relationship between individuals, intermediate groups, and states that feature prominently in liberal thought. The first approach, which Levy calls pluralist, is wary of the central state and friendly toward local, customary, voluntary, or intermediate bodies, communities, and associations. The second approach, which Levy refers to as rationalist, is committed to intellectual progress, universalism, and equality before a unified law. Liberals with the rationalist mindset tend to view intermediate groups with skepticism, seeing their distinctions and inequalities as arbitrary, irrational, and inimical to freedom. They tend to be more friendly to the central state, viewing it as a means of protecting individuals against the local tyrannies of religious and ethnic groups, closed associations, families, and other intermediate bodies.

Levy argues that the debate between the rationalist and pluralist mindsets cannot be resolved, and that liberal political theorists should refrain from attempting to synthesize the rationalist and pluralist approaches. According to Levy, both mindsets provide insights about freedom that should not be ignored.

== Selected bibliography ==
=== Books ===
- The Multiculturalism of Fear (Oxford University Press, 2000)
- Jacob T. Levy and Iris Marion Young, eds., Colonialism and Its Legacies (Rowman and Littlefield, 2011)
- James E. Fleming and Jacob T. Levy, eds., Nomos LV: Federalism and Subsidiarity (New York University Press, 2014)
- Rationalism, Pluralism, and Freedom (Oxford University Press, 2014)
- Daniel M. Weinstock, Jacob T. Levy, and Jocelyn Maclure, eds., Interpreting Modernity: Essays on the Work of Charles Taylor (McGill-Queens University Press, 2020)

=== Book chapter ===
- Levy, Jacob T. (2018). "Part I: Libertarianism and other Theories; Ch. 2: Toward a Non-Lockean Libertarianism". In Brennan, Jason; van der Vossen, Bas; Schmidtz, David (eds.). The Routledge Handbook of Libertarianism. London and New York: Taylor & Francis Group. pp. 22–33. ISBN 978-0367870591.
