= Historicity (philosophy) =

Idea or fact that something has a historical origin

Historicity in philosophy is the idea or fact that something has a historical origin and developed through history: concepts, practices, values. This is opposed to the belief that the same thing, in particular normative institutions or correlated ideologies, is natural or essential and thus exists universally.

Historicity relates to the underlying concept of history, or the intersection of teleology (the concept and study of progress and purpose), temporality (the concept of time), and historiography (semiotics and history of history). Historical "a priori" (historicity of a historical process) is a varying conceptualization of historicity, emphasizing the linear progress or the repetition or modulation of past events.

== Concepts of historicity ==
In phenomenology, historicity is the history of constitution of any intentional object, both in the sense of history as tradition and in the sense where every individual has its own history. Of course, these two senses are often very similar: One individual's history is heavily influenced by the tradition the individual is formed in, but personal history can also produce an object that wouldn't be a part of any tradition. In addition, personal historicity doesn't develop in the same way as tradition.

The term Historicity in phenomenology originated in the mature work of Edmund Husserl and developed by continuators of phenomenology such as Alfred Schütz, Martin Heidegger and Maurice Merleau-Ponty.

Martin Heidegger argued in Being and Time that it is temporality that gives rise to history. All things have their place and time, and nothing past is outside of history. Ingo Farin argues that Heidegger appropriated the concept from Wilhelm Dilthey and from Paul Yorck von Wartenburg and further clarifies Heidegger's meaning:

Heidegger calls authentic historicity the historical awareness that recognizes this whole range (i.e., the “simultaneity” of past, present, and future in the historical action one resolves to undertake).

Francis Fukuyama, in The End of History and the Last Man, famously argued that the collapse of Soviet communism brought humanity to the "end of history" whereby the world's global dialectical machinations had been resolved with the triumph of liberal capitalism.

Before Fukuyama, Jean Baudrillard argued for a different concept of the "end of history". Baudrillard's most in-depth writings on the notion of historicity are found in the books Fatal Strategies and The Illusion of the End. It is for these writings that he received a full-chapter denunciation from the physicist Alan Sokal (along with Jean Bricmont), due to his alleged misuse of physical concepts of linear time, space and stability. In contrast to Fukuyama's argument, Baudrillard maintained that the "end of history", in terms of a teleological goal, had always been an illusion brought about by modernity's will towards progress, civilisation and rational unification. And this was an illusion that to all intents and purposes vanished toward the end of the 20th century, brought about by the "speed" at which society moved, effectively "destabilising" the linear progression of history (it is these comments, specifically, that provoked Sokal's criticism). History was, so to speak, outpaced by its own spectacular realisation. As Baudrillard himself caustically put it:

The end of history is, alas, also the end of the dustbins of history. There are no longer any dustbins for disposing of old ideologies, old regimes, old values. Where are we going to throw Marxism, which actually invented the dustbins of history? (Yet there is some justice here since the very people who invented them have fallen in.) Conclusion: if there are no more dustbins of history, this is because History itself has become a dustbin. It has become its own dustbin, just as the planet itself is becoming its own dustbin.

This approach to history is what marks out Baudrillard's affinities with the postmodern philosophy of Jean-François Lyotard: the idea that society — and Western society in particular — has "dropped out" of the grand narratives of history (for example, the coming of Communism, or the triumph of civilised modern society). But Baudrillard has supplemented this argument by contending that, although this "dropping out" may have taken place, the global world (which in Baudrillard's writing is sharply distinct from a universal humanity) is, in accordance with its spectacular understanding of itself, condemned to "play out" this illusory ending in a hyper-teleological way — acting out the end of the end of the end, ad infinitum. Thus Baudrillard argues that — in a manner similar to that of Giorgio Agamben's book Means without Ends — Western society is subject to the political restriction of means that are justified by ends that do not exist.

Michel-Rolph Trouillot offers a different insight into the meaning and uses of historicity. Trouillot explains, "The ways in which what happened, and what is said to have happened are and are not the same may itself be historical".

== See also ==
- Historicism
- Temporality
- Oswald Spengler
