= Invagination (philosophy) =

Term in philosophy to explain a special kind of metanarrative

In continental philosophy, the term invagination is used to explain a special kind of metanarrative. It was first used by Maurice Merleau-Ponty to describe the dynamic self-differentiation of the 'flesh'. It was later used by Rosalind E. Krauss and Jacques Derrida ("The Law of Genre", Glyph 7, 1980); for Derrida, an invaginated text is a narrative that folds upon itself, "endlessly swapping outside for inside and thereby producing a structure en abyme". He applies the term to such texts as Immanuel Kant's Critique of Judgment and Maurice Blanchot's La Folie du Jour. Invagination is an aspect of différance, since according to Derrida it opens the "inside" to the "other" and denies both inside and outside a stable identity.
