= Phenomenological description =

Phenomenological description is a method of phenomenology that attempts to depict the structure of first person lived experience, rather than theoretically explain it. This method was first conceived of by Edmund Husserl. It was developed through the latter work of Martin Heidegger, Jean-Paul Sartre, Emmanuel Levinas and Maurice Merleau-Ponty — and others. It has also been developed with recent strands of modern psychology and cognitive science.

== Early proponents ==
=== Edmund Husserl ===
Edmund Husserl originally conceived of and developed the method of phenomenological description. His original method, called a Husserlian description, uncovers or discloses the structures and forms of conscious experience. A Husserlian description typically begins by describing an actual experience in the first person. For example, in The Phenomenology of the Consciousness of Internal Time Husserl describes the phenomenon of being conscious of an individual, actual tone. This description is "a typical example of Husserl's descriptive... method". Another good example of Husserl describing the structure of a conscious experience is his description of the act of naming his inkpot, provided in the Logical Investigations.

However, although Husserl's descriptions may begin at this basic level, they are often considerably more lengthy, involved and complex. For example, they often range from descriptions of the singular and empirical to descriptions of the essential and universal. Husserlian descriptions often depict the essential or invariant structures of conscious experience. For example, immediately after he describes the singular example of naming his inkpot in Logical Investigations he proceeds to describe the phenomenon of naming at the more general, invariant and essential level.

=== Martin Heidegger ===
Martin Heidegger's explication of phenomenological description is sketched out in the Introduction of his book Being and Time, where he argues that the way to best approach the question of the meaning of Being is to examine the concrete ways in which phenomena show themselves in themselves — as they seem in consciousness. By examining the way phenomena immediately present themselves, we can get insight into how revealing as such occurs. For Heidegger, truth is always revealing — aletheia. Important to note is that Heidegger's method of phenomenology represents a new tradition of "hermeneutic phenomenology" as opposed to merely descriptive, as in the Husserlian tradition.

=== Jean-Paul Sartre ===
Sartre's Nausea gives immediate first-person accounts of the main character Antoine Roquentin's lived experience. He describes the way objects lose their meaning and nausea disturbingly creeps up on him unexpectedly. His worst encounter is in a park with a tree root, where he realizes the gift (and burden) of human freedom as compared to other non-conscious beings. Sartre vividly characterizes what appears in the foreground of Antoine's awareness, including all of the ambiguity and confusion that is usually abstracted away in traditional or realist novels.

== Later research ==
Phenomenological description has found widespread application within psychology and the cognitive sciences. For example, Maurice Merleau-Ponty is the first well known phenomenologist to openly mingle the results of empirical research with phenomenologically descriptive research. Contemporarily, diverse theorists such as Shaun Gallagher, Dieter Lohmar, Natalie Depraz and Francisco Varela fall under the broad umbrella of what's being termed "hybrid" theorists, drawing on both phenomenological description and research from modern cognitive science.

According to L. Finlay (2009),

Phenomenological research characteristically starts with concrete descriptions of lived situations, often first-person accounts, set down in everyday language and avoiding abstract intellectual generalizations. The researcher proceeds by reflectively analyzing these descriptions, perhaps ideographically first, then by offering a synthesized account, for example, identifying general themes about the essence of the phenomenon. Importantly, the phenomenological researcher aims to go beyond surface expressions or explicit meanings to read between the lines so as to access implicit dimensions and intuitions.

Schmicking (2010) itemizes the aspects involved in approaching any particular phenomenon:

- Detecting and grasping (Nachgewahren).
- Analyzing.
- Describing (including everyday, technical, and symbolic languages).

== See also ==
- Descriptive psychology (Brentano)
