= Adrian van Kaam =

Dutch Catholic priest and educator

The Reverend Dr. Adrian van Kaam CSSp
- Born: April 19, 1920; The Hague, Netherlands
- Died: November 17, 2007 (aged 87); Pittsburgh, Pennsylvania, U.S.
- Occupation: Roman Catholic priest
- Known for: Contributions to psychology and spiritual formation

Adrian van Kaam, C.S.Sp. (April 19, 1920 – November 17, 2007) was a Dutch Catholic priest in the Congregation of the Holy Spirit, a professor, existentialist psychologist, writer on formative spirituality and founder of the Institute of Formative Spirituality at Duquesne University. He also founded the institute's successor, the Epiphany Association of Pittsburgh.

== Life ==
Van Kaam was born in The Hague, Netherlands, in 1920. He joined the minor seminary of the Holy Ghost Fathers in Weert at the age of 12, professing his vows on August 29, 1940.

He was at major seminary in Gemert in 1940, during the Nazi occupation of the Netherlands. While on retreat in the western Netherlands in 1944, Van Kaam was trapped behind Nazi front lines following Operation Market Garden. He hid in a barn while enduring the "hunger winter" of 1944, during which the Dutch were forced to subsist on turnips, potatoes and toxic tulip bulbs, an experience that had a permanent deleterious effect on his health. Although starving himself, Van Kaam made efforts to find food to take to Jews and others in hiding.

After his ordination as a priest on July 21, 1946, in Gemert, Van Kaam became a seminary professor, his health being too frail to allow him a life as a missionary. He led a series of classes on faith for young adults with the assistance of a Belgian mentor, Maria Schouwenaars. Eventually, at the behest of Msgr. Giovanni Battista Montini, later Pope Paul VI, Van Kaam was invited to teach these classes full-time.

In 1954, Van Kaam was sent to teach faith formation at Duquesne University, a Spiritan university in Pittsburgh, Pennsylvania. Upon arrival, however, he discovered that he was being asked to replace a deceased psychology professor. He had no background in psychology, so he was sent to obtain a degree in the subject. Travelling throughout the United States, he would study the subject under both Carl Rogers and Erik Erikson. Van Kaam earned a doctorate in philosophy from Case Western Reserve University, writing his dissertation on "The Experience of Really Feeling Understood by a Person." He became an American citizen shortly afterward.

Van Kaam then began his teaching career at Duquesne. After an accrediting agency objected to his courses, which combined psychology and religion with a "phenomenological air", Van Kaam returned to his background in spiritual direction in 1963. The university created the "Institute of Man," later renamed the Institute of Formative Spirituality, as a venue for Van Kaam's unique approach. The institute would have a role in the post–Vatican II "reshaping" of Catholic spirituality.

In 1980, he suffered a near fatal heart attack but continued writing and working. He founded the Epiphany Association in 1988 in an effort to bring Catholic spirituality to lay people. The Institute of Formative Spirituality was closed in 1995 due to financial reasons, and Van Kaam, with the assistance of a colleague, Dr. Susan Muto, continued his work with the Epiphany Association in the Pittsburgh neighborhood of Beechview. He received an honorary Doctorate of Christian Letters from the Franciscan University of Steubenville in 1994.

Van Kaam retired to the Spiritan priests' retirement home in Bethel Park in 2004. He died on November 17, 2007, in the nursing home of the Little Sisters of the Poor in Pittsburgh's North Side, and was buried in Queen of Heaven Cemetery in Peters Township, Pennsylvania.

== Works ==
Van Kaam is the author of about thirty books and hundreds of articles. His early works were aimed specifically towards Catholics and psychologists and focused on typically Catholic subjects and a critique of contemporary psychological theories. In the 1970s and 80s, however, Van Kaam began to explore a "science of spirituality," which led to a voluminous series entitled Formative Spirituality.
