= Benedikt Paul Göcke =

German philosopher and theologian

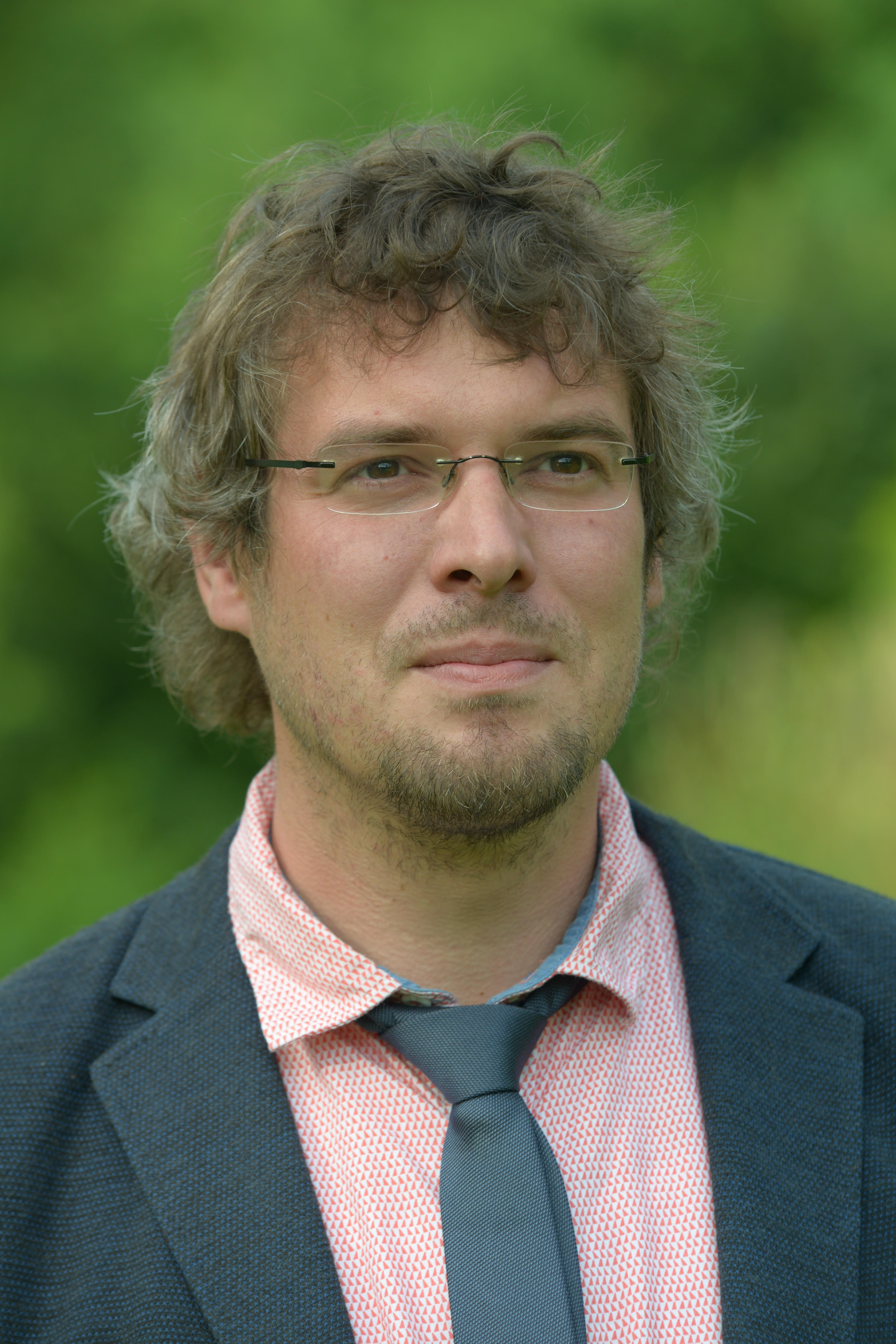
- Born: May 1, 1981 (age 45); Steinfurt, West Germany

Education
- Education: University of Münster

Philosophical work
- Era: Contemporary philosophy
- Region: Western philosophy
- School: Analytic philosophy Continental philosophy
- Main interests: Metaphysics, philosophy of science, transhumanism, history of philosophy, philosophy of religion

Benedikt Paul Göcke (born May 1, 1981) is a German philosopher and theologian. He is University Professor for the Philosophy of Religion and Philosophy of Science at the Catholic Theological Faculty of the Ruhr University Bochum and an associate member of the Faculty of Theology and Religion at the University of Oxford. His research includes theoretical, practical and historical philosophy and can be divided into three main areas: philosophy of science and metaphysics, transhumanism and ethics of digitization, and German Idealism, in particular the philosophy of Karl Christian Friedrich Krause (1781–1832).

== Biography ==
After studying philosophy, Catholic theology and religious studies at the University of Münster, Göcke received his doctorate in 2011 under Klaus Müller with a thesis on the panentheism of Karl Christian Friedrich Krause at the Catholic theological faculty. Göcke obtained a second doctorate in, this time in philosophy, in 2013 at the Munich School of Philosophy. The work was supervised by Godehard Brüntrup and was published by Palgrave Macmillan in 2014 under the title "A Theory of the Absolute". From 2008 to 2012 Göcke was also a research fellow in Religion and Politics under Klaus Müller and from 2010 to 2013 a Junior Research Fellow in Philosophy at Blackfriars, Oxford. From 2012 to 2015 Göcke was a postdoctoral fellow at the Faculty of Catholic Theology at the Ruhr-Universität Bochum. Since 2016 he has been the group leader of an Emmy Noether project on theology as a science. Following a junior professorship from 2017 to 2019, Göcke has been Professor for the Philosophy of Religion and Philosophy of Science since 2019. He has also been an Associate Member of the Faculty of Theology and Religion at the University of Oxford since 2017.

Göcke is the editor of After Physicalism published in 2012.

== Research ==
In the field of philosophy of science and metaphysics, Göcke's research focuses in on questions about the epistemological positioning of theology. Goecke's work deals with basic research on the theory of science, which tries to specify the concept of scientific in order to develop a criterion to differentiate between sciences and pseudo-sciences. In this context, Göcke has given special attention to denominational and scientific theology, and to naturalistic and atheistic objections to the viewing theology as a science.

In the field of transhumanism and the ethics of digitization, Göcke's research concentrates on the one hand on analyzing the philosophical agenda of transhumanism and the arguments that speak for or against a cybernetic change in the biological nature of humans. Göcke's research also investigates the religiously coded assumptions of the transhumanist agenda and its promise of salvation and examines the extent to which elements of transhumanist thought can be supported from a Christian perspective, for example in the context of process theology .

In the history of philosophy Göcke is a leading specialist on the thought of Karl Christian Friedrich Krause (1781–1832), which he places in the context of “classical German philosophy”. Göcke has aimed to show that Krause's thinking has been wrongly forgotten. According to Göcke, Krause developed the first consistently panentheistic system of philosophy which unites all essential areas of philosophical thought. Göcke contends that Krause's work can be directly linked to numerous current discussions in ethics, religious philosophy, anthropology and political philosophy.

== Awards ==
- Heinz Maier-Leibnitz-Preis of the Deutsche Forschungsgemeinschaft for outstanding young scientists (2018)

== Books authored ==
- The Panentheism of Karl Christian Friedrich Krause (1781-1832): From Transcendental Philosophy to Metaphysics. Oxford, Berlin: Peter Lang. 2018. ISBN 9783631746905
- A Theory of the Absolute. Palgrave Frontiers in Philosophy of Religion. Palgrave Macmillan. 2014. ISBN 9781137412812
- Everything in God? On the Topicality of the Panentheism of Karl Christian Friedrich Krause – Alles in Gott?: zur Aktualität des Panentheismus Karl Christian Friedrich Krauses. 2012. ISBN 9783791724300
