= Temporality =

Concept in philosophy

In philosophy, temporality refers to the idea of a linear progression of past, present, and future. The term is frequently used, however, in the context of critiques of commonly held ideas of linear time. In social sciences, temporality is studied with respect to the human perception of time and the social organization of time. The perception of time in Western thought underwent significant changes in the three hundred years between the Middle Ages and modernity.

Examples in Continental philosophy of philosophers raising questions of temporality include Edmund Husserl's analysis of internal time consciousness, Martin Heidegger's Being and Time, J. M. E. McTaggart's article "The Unreality of Time", George Herbert Mead's Philosophy of the Present, and Jacques Derrida's criticisms of Husserl's analysis.

Temporality is "deeply intertwined with the rhetorical act of harnessing and subverting power in the unfolding struggle for justice." Temporalities, particularly in European settler colonialism, have been observed in critical theory as a tool for both subjugation and oppression of Indigenous communities, and Native resistance to that oppression.

== Temporal turn ==
In historiography, questioning periodization, and as a further development after the spatial turn, social sciences have started re-investigating time and its different social understanding. Temporal turn social science investigates different understandings of time at different times and locations, giving rise to concepts such as timespace where time and space are thought together.

== See also ==
- Futures studies
- Historicity (philosophy)
- Impermanence
- Linear temporal logic
- Philosophy of space and time
- Time series
- Vanitas
