= Maurice Merleau-Ponty =

French phenomenological philosopher (1908–1961)

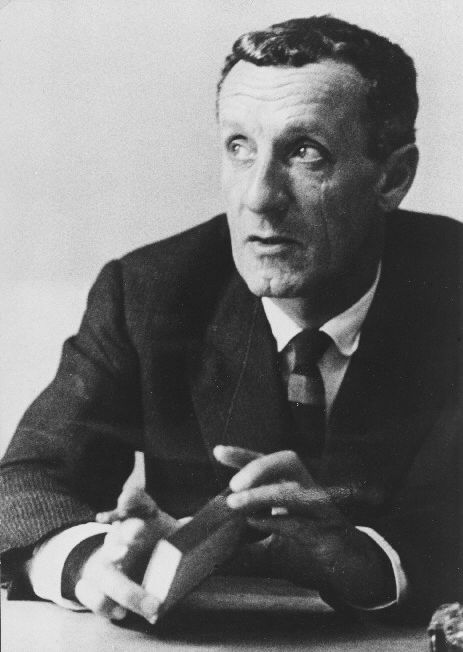
- Born: Maurice Jean Jacques Merleau-Ponty; 14 March 1908; Rochefort-sur-Mer, Charente-Inférieure, France
- Died: 3 May 1961 (aged 53); Paris, France
- Other name: "Jacques Heller"

Education
- Education: École Normale Supérieure (M.A., 1929); University of Paris (Ph.D., 1945)
- Doctoral advisor: Émile Bréhier

Philosophical work
- Era: 20th-century philosophy
- Region: Western philosophy
- School: Continental; Phenomenology; Western Marxism
- Institutions: University of Lyon; University of Paris; Collège de France
- Notable students: Michel Foucault; Jean Laplanche; Claude Lefort; Trần Đức Thảo
- Main interests: Aesthetics; anthropology; consciousness; embodiment; Gestalt theory; meaning; ontology; perception; politics; psychology; spatiality
- Notable ideas: Embodied cognition; invagination; intentionality of the body; ontology of the flesh of the world; speaking vs. spoken language

Maurice Jean Jacques Merleau-Ponty (/ˌmɜːrloʊ ˈpɒnti/ MUR-loh PON-tee; French: [mɔʁis mɛʁlo pɔ̃ti]; 14 March 1908 – 3 May 1961) was a French phenomenological philosopher, strongly influenced by Edmund Husserl and Martin Heidegger. The constitution of meaning in human experience was his main interest and he wrote on perception, art, politics, religion, biology, psychology, psychoanalysis, language, nature, and history. He was the lead editor of Les Temps modernes, the leftist magazine he established with Jean-Paul Sartre and Simone de Beauvoir in 1945.

At the core of Merleau-Ponty's philosophy is a sustained argument for the foundational role that perception plays in the human experience of the world. Merleau-Ponty understands perception to be an ongoing dialogue between one's lived body and the world which it perceives, in which perceivers passively and actively strive to express the perceived world in concert with others. He was the only major phenomenologist of the first half of the twentieth century to engage extensively with the sciences. It is through this engagement that his writings became influential in the project of naturalising phenomenology, in which phenomenologists use the results of psychology and cognitive science.

Merleau-Ponty emphasised the body as the primary site of knowing the world, a corrective to the long philosophical tradition of placing consciousness as the source of knowledge, and maintained that the perceiving body and its perceived world could not be disentangled from each other. The articulation of the primacy of embodiment (corporéité) led him away from phenomenology towards what he was to call "indirect ontology" or the ontology of "the flesh of the world" (la chair du monde), seen in his final and incomplete work, The Visible and Invisible, and his last published essay, "Eye and Mind".

== Life ==
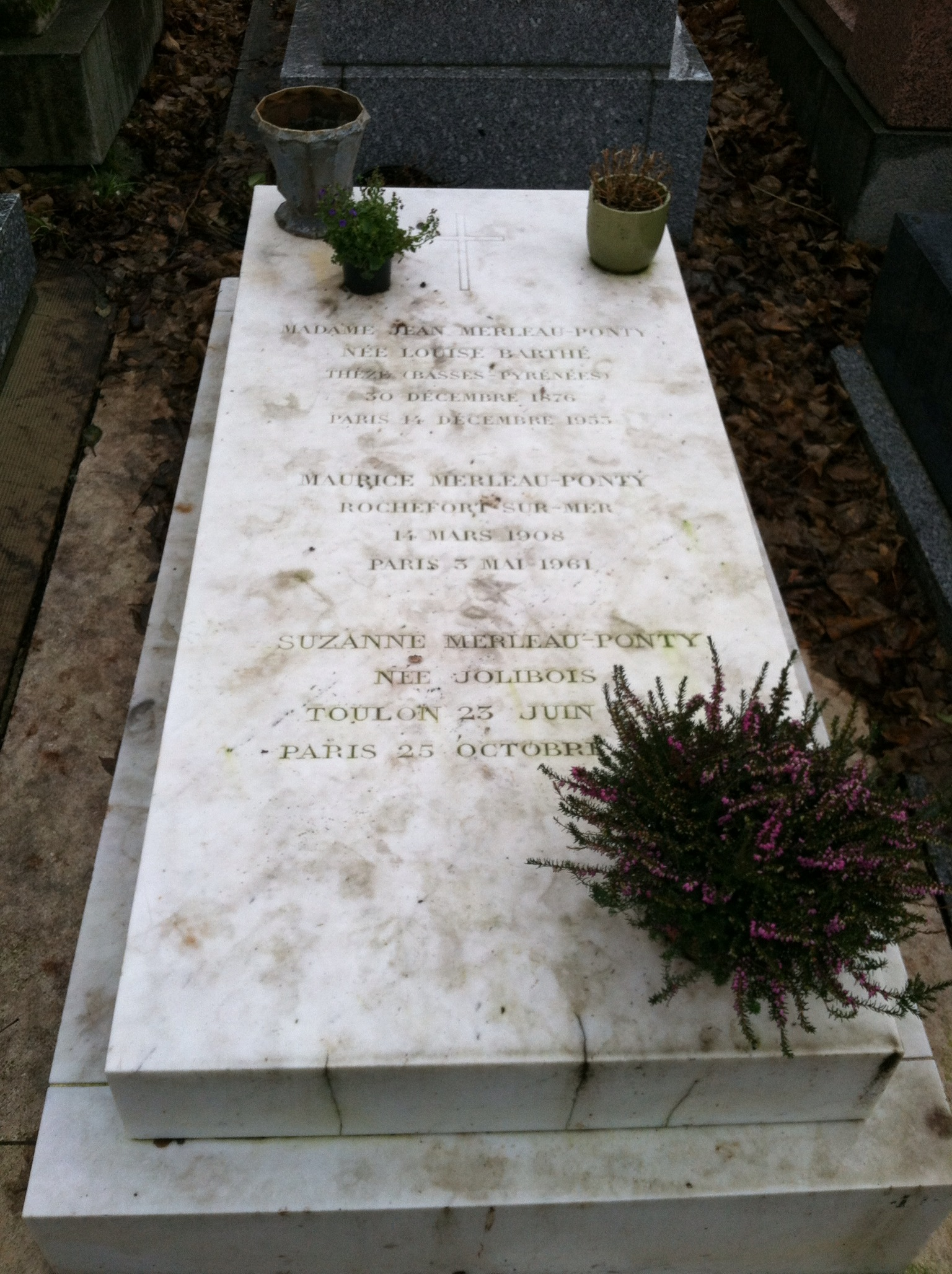
Merleau-Ponty's grave at Père Lachaise Cemetery in Paris, where he is buried with his mother Louise, his wife Suzanne, and his daughter Marianne

Maurice Merleau-Ponty was born in 1908 in Rochefort-sur-Mer, Charente-Inférieure (now Charente-Maritime), France. His father died in 1913 when Merleau-Ponty was five years old. After secondary schooling at the Lycée Louis-le-Grand in Paris, Merleau-Ponty became a student at the École Normale Supérieure, where he studied alongside Jean-Paul Sartre, Simone de Beauvoir, Simone Weil, Jean Hyppolite, and Jean Wahl. As Beauvoir recounts in her autobiography, she developed a close friendship with Merleau-Ponty and became smitten with him, but ultimately found him too well-adjusted to bourgeois life and values for her taste. He attended Edmund Husserl's "Paris Lectures" in February 1929. In 1929, Merleau-Ponty received his DES degree (diplôme d'études supérieures, roughly equivalent to a M.A.) from the University of Paris, on the basis of the (now-lost) thesis La Notion de multiple intelligible chez Plotin ("Plotinus's Notion of the Intelligible Many"), directed by Émile Bréhier. He passed the agrégation in philosophy in 1930.

Merleau-Ponty was raised as a Roman Catholic. He was friends with the Christian existentialist author and philosopher Gabriel Marcel and wrote articles for the Christian leftist journal Esprit, but he left the Catholic Church in 1937 because he felt his socialist politics were not compatible with the social and political doctrine of the Catholic Church.

An article published in the French newspaper Le Monde in October 2014 makes the case of recent discoveries about Merleau-Ponty's likely authorship of the novel Nord. Récit de l'arctique (Grasset, 1928). Convergent sources from close friends (Beauvoir, Elisabeth "Zaza" Lacoin) seem to leave little doubt that Jacques Heller was a pseudonym of the 20-year-old Merleau-Ponty.

Merleau-Ponty taught first at the Lycée Félix-Faure in Beauvais (1931–33) and then got a fellowship to do research from the Caisse nationale de la recherche scientifique (the predecessor of the Centre national de la recherche scientifique). From 1934 to 1935, he taught at the Lycée Marceau in Chartres. He then, in 1935, became a tutor at the École Normale Supérieure (where he tutored the young Trần Đức Thảo) and taught there until 1939. During this time, he attended Alexandre Kojève's influential seminars on Georg Wilhelm Friedrich Hegel and Aron Gurwitsch's lectures on Gestalt psychology.

In the spring of 1939, he was the first foreign visitor to the newly established Husserl Archives, where he consulted Husserl's unpublished manuscripts and met Eugen Fink and Herman Van Breda. In the summer of 1939, as France declared war on Nazi Germany, he served on the frontlines in the French Army, where he was wounded in battle in June 1940. Upon returning to Paris in the fall of 1940, he married Suzanne Jolibois, a Lacanian psychoanalyst, and founded an underground resistance group with Jean-Paul Sartre called "Sous la Botte – Under the Boot" (the group was renamed "Socialisme et Liberté – Socialism and Liberty", a year later). He participated in an armed demonstration against the Nazi forces during the liberation of Paris.

During the war, he taught at the Lycée Carnot (1940–1944), where he tutored the young Claude Lefort, and at the Lycée Condorcet (1944–1945). In 1945, he was awarded his doctorate on the basis of two important books: La structure du comportement (1942) and Phénoménologie de la Perception (1945). Merleau-Ponty possessed extensive knowledge in psychology, neurology, and psychiatry.

After teaching at the University of Lyon from 1945 to 1948 and the École Normale Supérieure from 1947 to 1948 (where he tutored the young Michel Foucault), Merleau-Ponty lectured on child psychology and education at the Sorbonne from 1949 to 1952. He was awarded the Chair of Philosophy at the Collège de France in 1952 (and taught there until his death in 1961), making him the youngest person to have been elected to a chair.

Besides his teaching, Merleau-Ponty was also political editor for the leftist journal Les Temps modernes from its founding in October 1945 until December 1952. In his youth, he had read Karl Marx's writings and Sartre even claimed that Merleau-Ponty converted him to Marxism. E. K. Kuby states that while Merleau-Ponty was not a member of the French Communist Party and did not identify as a Communist, he laid out an argument justifying the Moscow Trials and political violence for progressive ends in general in the work Humanism and Terror in 1947. Kuby states that, about three years after that, however, he renounced his earlier support for political violence in Adventures of the Dialectic (1955). His friendship with Sartre and work with Les Temps modernes ended because of that, since Sartre still had a more favourable attitude towards Soviet communism. Merleau-Ponty was subsequently active in the French non-Communist left and in particular in the Union of the Democratic Forces.

Merleau-Ponty died suddenly of a stroke in 1961 at age 53, apparently while preparing for a class on René Descartes, leaving an unfinished manuscript which was posthumously published in 1964, along with a selection of Merleau-Ponty's working notes, by Claude Lefort as The Visible and the Invisible. He is buried in Père Lachaise Cemetery in Paris with his mother Louise, his wife Suzanne and their daughter Marianne.

== Thought ==
=== Consciousness ===
In his Phenomenology of Perception (first published in French in 1945), Merleau-Ponty develops the concept of the body-subject (le corps propre) as an alternative to the Cartesian "cogito". This distinction is especially important in that Merleau-Ponty perceives the essences of the world existentially. Consciousness, the world, and the human body as a perceiving thing are intricately intertwined and mutually "engaged". The phenomenal thing is not the unchanging object of the natural sciences, but a correlate of the human body and its sensory-motor functions. Taking up and "communing with" (Merleau-Ponty's phrase) the sensible qualities it encounters, the body as incarnated subjectivity intentionally elaborates things within an ever-present world frame, through use of its pre-conscious, pre-predicative understanding of the world's makeup. The elaboration, however, is "inexhaustible" (the hallmark of any perception according to Merleau-Ponty). Things are that upon which the body has a "grip" (prise), while the grip itself is a function of human connaturality with the world's things. The world and the sense of self are emergent phenomena in an ongoing "becoming".

The essential partiality of the view of things, their being given only in a certain perspective and at a certain moment in time does not diminish their reality, but on the contrary establishes it, as there is no other way for things to be copresent in the world and with other things than through such "Abschattungen" ("sketches, faint outlines, adumbrations"). The thing transcends perception, but is manifest precisely by presenting itself to a range of possible views. The object of perception is immanently tied to its background—to the nexus of meaningful relations among objects within the world. Because the object is inextricably within the world of meaningful relations, each object reflects the other (much in the style of Leibniz's monads). Through involvement in the world – being-in-the-world – the perceiver tacitly experiences all the perspectives upon that object coming from all the surrounding things of its environment, as well as the potential perspectives that that object has upon the beings around it.

Each object is a "mirror of all others". The perception of the object through all perspectives is not that of a propositional, or clearly delineated, perception; rather, it is an ambiguous perception founded upon the body's primordial involvement and understanding of the world and of the meanings that constitute the landscape's perceptual Gestalt. Only after an integration within the environment so as to perceive objects as such can attention be turned toward particular objects within the landscape so as to define them more clearly. This attention, however, does not operate by clarifying what is already seen, but by constructing a new Gestalt oriented toward a particular object. Because the bodily involvement with things is always provisional and indeterminate, meaningful things are encountered in a unified though ever open-ended world.

=== The primacy of perception ===
From the time of writing Structure of Behaviour and Phenomenology of Perception, Merleau-Ponty wanted to show, in opposition to the idea that drove the tradition beginning with John Locke, that perception was not the causal product of atomic sensations. This atomist-causal conception was being perpetuated in certain psychological currents of the time, particularly in behaviourism. According to Merleau-Ponty, perception has an active dimension, in that it is a primordial openness to the lifeworld (the "Lebenswelt").

This primordial openness is at the heart of his thesis of the primacy of perception. The slogan of Husserl's phenomenology is "all consciousness is consciousness of something", which implies a distinction between "acts of thought" (the noesis) and "intentional objects of thought" (the noema). Thus, the correlation between noesis and noema becomes the first step in the constitution of analyses of consciousness. However, in studying the second volume of Ideas and the posthumous manuscripts of Husserl, who remained one of his major influences, Merleau-Ponty remarked that, in their evolution, Husserl's work brings to light phenomena which are not assimilable to noesis–noema correlation. This is particularly the case when one attends to the phenomena of the body (which is at once body-subject and body-object), subjective time (the consciousness of time is neither an act of consciousness nor an object of thought) and the other (Husserl's consideration of which was often met with objections, and was, at times, misread as solipsistic).

The distinction between "acts of thought" (noesis) and "intentional objects of thought" (noema) does not seem, therefore, to constitute an irreducible ground. It appears rather at a higher level of analysis. Thus, Merleau-Ponty does not postulate that "all consciousness is consciousness of something", which supposes at the outset a noetic-noematic ground. Instead, he develops the thesis according to which "all consciousness is perceptual consciousness". In doing so, he establishes a significant turn in the development of phenomenology, indicating that its conceptualisations should be re-examined in the light of the primacy of perception, in weighing up the philosophical consequences of this thesis.

=== Corporeity ===
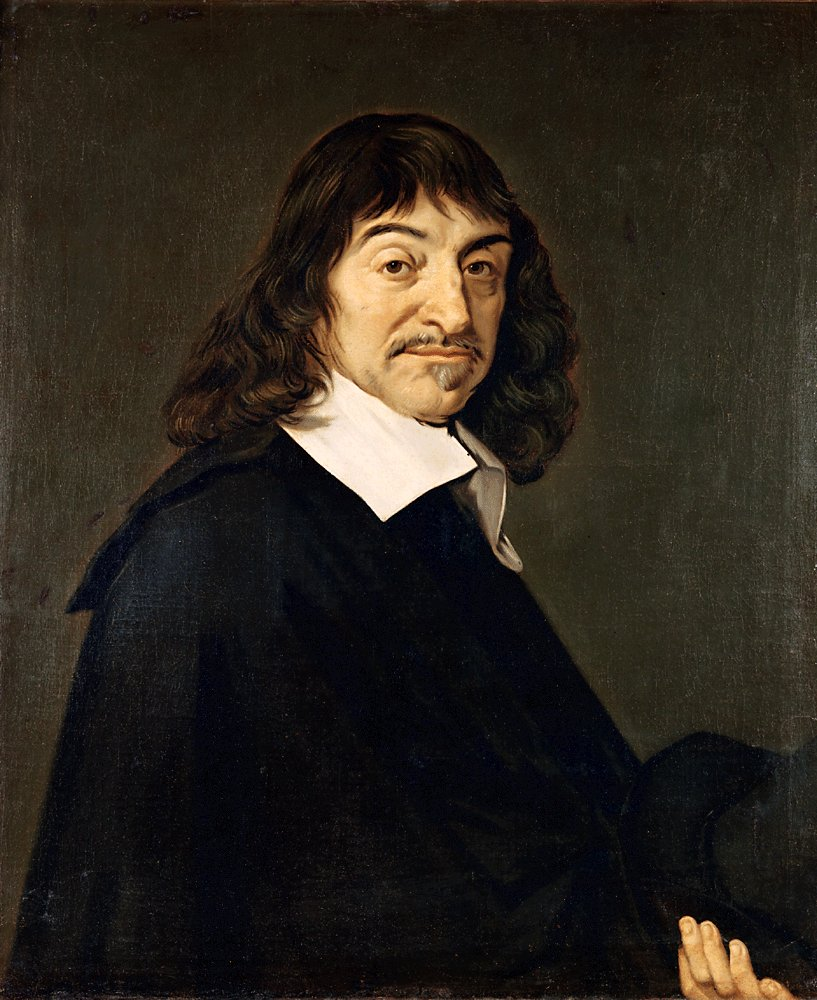
Portrait of the 17th-century French philosopher René Descartes, one of the leading exponents of rationalism in the history of Western philosophy

Taking the study of perception as his point of departure, Merleau-Ponty was led to recognize that one's own body (le corps propre) is not only a thing, a potential object of study for science, but is also a permanent condition of experience, a constituent of the perceptual openness to the world. He therefore underlines the fact that there is an inherence of consciousness and of the body of which the analysis of perception should take account. The primacy of perception signifies a primacy of experience, so to speak, insofar as perception becomes an active and constitutive dimension.

Merleau-Ponty demonstrates a corporeity of consciousness as much as an intentionality of the body, and so stands in contrast with the dualist ontology of mind and body in Descartes, a philosopher to whom Merleau-Ponty continually returned, despite the important differences that separate them. In the Phenomenology of Perception Merleau-Ponty wrote: "Insofar as I have hands, feet, a body, I sustain around me intentions which are not dependent on my decisions and which affect my surroundings in a way that I do not choose" (1962, p. 440).

=== Spatiality ===
The question concerning corporeity connects also with Merleau-Ponty's reflections on space (l'espace) and the primacy of the dimension of depth (la profondeur) as implied in the notion of Being-in-the-world (être au monde; to echo Heidegger's In-der-Welt-sein) and of one's own body (le corps propre). Reflections on spatiality in phenomenology are also central to the advanced philosophical deliberations in architectural theory.

=== Language ===
The highlighting of the fact that corporeity intrinsically has a dimension of expressivity which proves to be fundamental to the constitution of the ego is one of the conclusions of The Structure of Behaviour (1942) that is constantly reiterated in Merleau-Ponty's later works. Following this theme of expressivity, he goes on to examine how an incarnate subject is in a position to undertake actions that transcend the organic level of the body, such as in intellectual operations and the products of one's cultural life.

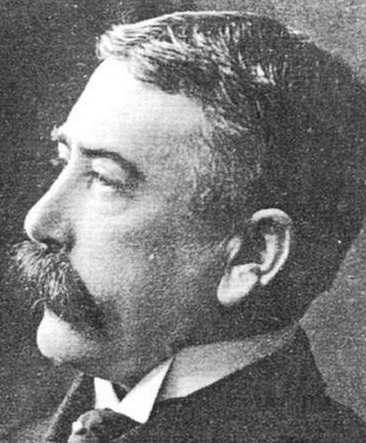
Photograph of the Swiss linguist Ferdinand de Saussure, considered to be the father of modern linguistics

He carefully considers language, then, as the core of culture, by examining in particular the connections between the unfolding of thought and sense—enriching his perspective not only by an analysis of the acquisition of language and the expressivity of the body, but also by taking into account pathologies of language, painting, cinema, literature, poetry, and music.

This work deals mainly with language, beginning with the reflection on artistic expression in The Structure of Behavior—which contains a passage on El Greco that prefigures the remarks that he develops in "Cézanne's Doubt" (1945) and follows the discussion in Phenomenology of Perception. The work, undertaken while serving as the Chair of Child Psychology and Pedagogy at the University of Paris, is not a departure from his philosophical and phenomenological works, but rather an important continuation in the development of his thought.

As the course outlines of his Sorbonne lectures indicate, during this period he continues a dialogue between phenomenology and the diverse work carried out in psychology, all in order to return to the study of the acquisition of language in children, as well as to broadly take advantage of the contribution of Ferdinand de Saussure to linguistics, and to work on the notion of structure through a discussion of work in psychology, linguistics and social anthropology.

=== Art ===
Merleau-Ponty distinguishes between primary and secondary modes of expression. This distinction appears in Phenomenology of Perception (p. 207, 2nd note [Fr. ed.]) and is sometimes repeated in terms of spoken and speaking language (le langage parlé et le langage parlant) (The Prose of the World, p. 10). Spoken language (le langage parlé), or secondary expression, returns to the speaker's linguistic baggage and cultural heritage, as well as the brute mass of relationships between signs and significations. Speaking language (le langage parlant), or primary expression, such as it is, is language in the production of a sense, language at the advent of a thought, at the moment where it makes itself an advent of sense.

It is speaking language, that is to say, primary expression, that interests Merleau-Ponty and which keeps his attention through his treatment of the nature of production and the reception of expressions, a subject which also overlaps with an analysis of action, of intentionality, of perception, as well as the links between freedom and external conditions.

The notion of style occupies an important place in his essay "Indirect Language and the Voices of Silence" (the first chapter of Signes, 1960). In spite of certain similarities with André Malraux, Merleau-Ponty distinguishes himself from Malraux in respect to three conceptions of style, the last of which is employed in Malraux's The Voices of Silence. Merleau-Ponty remarks that in this work "style" is sometimes used by Malraux in a highly subjective sense, understood as a projection of the artist's individuality. Sometimes it is used, on the contrary, in a very metaphysical sense (in Merleau-Ponty's opinion, a mystical sense), in which style is connected with a conception of an "über-artist" expressing "the Spirit of Painting". Finally, it sometimes is reduced to simply designating a categorization of an artistic school or movement. (However, this account of Malraux's notion of style—a key element in his thinking—is open to serious question.)

For Merleau-Ponty, it is these uses of the notion of style that lead Malraux to postulate a separation between the objectivity of Italian Renaissance painting and the subjectivity of painting in his own time, a conclusion that Merleau-Ponty disputes. According to Merleau-Ponty, it is important to consider the heart of this problematic by recognizing that style is first of all a demand owed to the primacy of perception, which also implies taking into consideration the dimensions of historicity and intersubjectivity. (However, Merleau-Ponty's reading of Malraux has been questioned in a recent major study of Malraux's theory of art, which argues that Merleau-Ponty seriously misunderstood Malraux.) For Merleau-Ponty, style is born of the interaction between two or more fields of being. Rather than being exclusive to individual human consciousness, consciousness is born of the pre-conscious style of the world, of Nature.

=== Science ===
In his essay "Cézanne's Doubt" (1945), in which he identifies Paul Cézanne's impressionistic theory of painting as analogous to his own concept of radical reflection, the attempt to return to, and reflect on, prereflective consciousness, Merleau-Ponty identifies science as the opposite of art. In Merleau-Ponty's account, whereas art is an attempt to capture an individual's perception, science is anti-individualistic. In the preface to his Phenomenology of Perception, Merleau-Ponty presents a phenomenological objection to positivism: that it can reveal nothing about human subjectivity. All that a scientific text can explain is the particular individual experience of that scientist, which cannot be transcended. For Merleau-Ponty, science neglects the depth and profundity of the phenomena that it endeavours to explain.

Merleau-Ponty understood science to be an ex post facto abstraction. Causal and physiological accounts of perception, for example, explain perception in terms that are arrived at only after abstracting from the phenomenon itself. Merleau-Ponty chastised science for taking itself to be the area in which a complete account of nature may be given. The subjective depth of phenomena cannot be given in science as it is. This characterizes Merleau-Ponty's attempt to ground science in phenomenological objectivity and, in essence, to institute a "return to the phenomena".

== Influence ==
=== Anticognitivist cognitive science ===
Merleau-Ponty's critical position with respect to science was stated in his Preface to the Phenomenology: he described scientific points of view as "always both naive and at the same time dishonest". Despite, or perhaps because of, this view, his work influenced and anticipated the strands of modern psychology known as post-cognitivism. Hubert Dreyfus has been instrumental in emphasising the relevance of Merleau-Ponty's work to current post-cognitive research, and its criticism of the traditional view of cognitive science.

Dreyfus's seminal critique of cognitivism (or the computational account of the mind), What Computers Can't Do, consciously replays Merleau-Ponty's critique of intellectualist psychology to argue for the irreducibility of corporeal know-how to discrete, syntactic processes. Through the influence of Dreyfus's critique and neurophysiological alternative, Merleau-Ponty became associated with neurophysiological, connectionist accounts of cognition.

With the publication in 1991 of The Embodied Mind: Cognitive Science and Human Experience, by Francisco Varela, Evan Thompson, and Eleanor Rosch, this association was extended, if only partially, to another strand of "anti-cognitivist" or post-representationalist cognitive science: embodied or enactive cognitive science, and later in the decade, to neurophenomenology. In addition, Merleau-Ponty's work has also influenced researchers trying to integrate neuroscience with the principles of chaos theory.

It was through this relationship with Merleau-Ponty's work that cognitive science's affair with phenomenology was born, which is represented by a growing number of works, including

- Ron McClamrock, Existential Cognition: Computational Minds in the World (1995)
- Andy Clark, Being There (1997)
- Jean Petitot et al. (eds.), Naturalizing Phenomenology (1999)
- Alva Noë, Action in Perception (2004)
- Shaun Gallagher, How the Body Shapes the Mind (2005)
- Franck Grammont, Dorothée Legrand, and Pierre Livet (eds.), Naturalizing Intention in Action (2010)
- The journal Phenomenology and the Cognitive Sciences

=== Feminist philosophy ===
Merleau-Ponty has also been picked up by Australian and Nordic philosophers inspired by the French feminist tradition, including Rosalyn Diprose and Sara Heinämaa.

Heinämaa has argued for a rereading of Merleau-Ponty's influence on Simone de Beauvoir. (She has also challenged Dreyfus's reading of Merleau-Ponty as behaviorist, and as neglecting the importance of the phenomenological reduction to Merleau-Ponty's thought.)

Merleau-Ponty's phenomenology of the body has also been taken up by Iris Young in her essay "Throwing Like a Girl," and its follow-up, "'Throwing Like a Girl': Twenty Years Later". Young analyses the particular modalities of feminine bodily comportment as they differ from those of men. Young observes that while a man who throws a ball puts his whole body into the motion, a woman throwing a ball generally restricts her own movements as she makes them, and that, generally, in sports, women move in a more tentative, reactive way. Merleau-Ponty argues that people experience the world in terms of the "I can" – that is, oriented towards certain projects based on capacity and habituality. Young's thesis is that in women, this intentionality is inhibited and ambivalent, rather than confident, experienced as an "I cannot".

=== Ecophenomenology ===
Ecophenomenology can be described as the pursuit of the relationalities of worldly engagement, both human and those of other creatures (Brown & Toadvine 2003).

This engagement is situated in a kind of middle ground of relationality, a space that is neither purely objective, because it is reciprocally constituted by a diversity of lived experiences motivating the movements of countless organisms, nor purely subjective, because it is nonetheless a field of material relationships between bodies. It is governed exclusively neither by causality nor by intentionality. In this space of in-betweenness, phenomenology can overcome its inaugural opposition to naturalism.

David Abram explains Merleau-Ponty's concept of "flesh" (chair) as "the mysterious tissue or matrix that underlies and gives rise to both the perceiver and the perceived as interdependent aspects of its spontaneous activity", and he identifies this elemental matrix with the interdependent web of earthly life. This concept unites subject and object dialectically as determinations within a more primordial reality, which Merleau-Ponty calls "the flesh" and which Abram refers to variously as "the animate earth", "the breathing biosphere" or "the more-than-human natural world". Yet this is not nature or the biosphere conceived as a complex set of objects and objective processes, but rather "the biosphere as it is experienced and lived from within by the intelligent body — by the attentive human animal who is entirely a part of the world that he or she experiences. Merleau-Ponty's ecophenomenology with its emphasis on holistic dialogue within the larger-than-human world also has implications for the ontogenesis and phylogenesis of language; indeed he states that "language is the very voice of the trees, the waves and the forest".

Merleau-Ponty himself refers to "that primordial being which is not yet the subject-being nor the object-being and which in every respect baffles reflection. From this primordial being to us, there is no derivation, nor any break..." Among the many working notes found on his desk at the time of his death, and published with the half-complete manuscript of The Visible and the Invisible, several make it evident that Merleau-Ponty himself recognized a deep affinity between his notion of a primordial "flesh" and a radically transformed understanding of "nature". Hence, in November 1960 he writes: "Do a psychoanalysis of Nature: it is the flesh, the mother." And in the last published working note, written in March 1961, he writes: "Nature as the other side of humanity (as flesh, nowise as 'matter')." This resonates with the conception of space, place, dwelling, and embodiment (in the flesh and physical, vs. virtual and cybernetic), especially as they are addressed against the background of the unfolding of the essence of modern technology. Such analytics figure in a Heideggerian take on "econtology" as an extension of Heidegger's consideration of the question of being (Seinsfrage) by way of the fourfold (Das Geviert) of earth-sky-mortals-divinities (Erde und Himmel, Sterblichen und Göttlichen). In this strand of "ecophenomenology", ecology is co-entangled with ontology, whereby the worldly existential analytics are grounded in earthiness, and environmentalism is orientated by ontological thinking.

== Bibliography ==
The following table gives a selection of Merleau-Ponty's works in French and English translation.

Year	Original French	English translation
1942	La Structure du comportement (Paris: Presses Universitaires de France, 1942)	The Structure of Behavior – trans. by Alden Fisher (Boston: Beacon Press, 1963; London: Methuen, 1965)
1945	Phénoménologie de la perception (Paris: Gallimard, 1945)	Phenomenology of Perception – trans. by Colin Smith (New York: Humanities Press, and London: Routledge & Kegan Paul, 1962); trans. revised by Forrest Williams (1981; reprinted, 2002); new trans. by Donald A. Landes (New York: Routledge, 2012)
1947	Humanisme et terreur, essai sur le problème communiste (Paris: Gallimard, 1947)	Humanism and Terror: An Essay on the Communist Problem – trans. by John O'Neill (Boston: Beacon Press, 1969)
1948	Sens et non-sens (Paris: Nagel, 1948, 1966)	Sense and Non-Sense – trans. by Hubert Dreyfus and Patricia Allen Dreyfus (Evanston: Northwestern University Press, 1964)
1949–50	Conscience et l'acquisition du langage (Paris: Bulletin de psychologie, 236, vol. XVIII, 3–6, Nov. 1964)	Consciousness and the Acquisition of Language – trans. by Hugh J. Silverman (Evanston: Northwestern University Press, 1973)
1949–52	Merleau-Ponty à la Sorbonne: résumé de cours, 1949-1952 (Grenoble: Cynara, 1988)	Child Psychology and Pedagogy: The Sorbonne Lectures 1949-1952 – trans. by Talia Welsh (Evanston: Northwestern University Press, 2010)
1951	Les Relations avec autrui chez l'enfant (Paris: Centre de Documentation Universitaire, 1951, 1975)	The Child's Relations with Others – trans. by William Cobb in The Primacy of Perception ed. by James M. Edie (Evanston: Northwestern University Press, 1964), 96-155
1953	Éloge de la Philosophie, Leçon inaugurale faite au Collége de France, Le jeudi 15 janvier 1953 (Paris: Gallimard, 1953)	In Praise of Philosophy – trans. by John Wild and James M. Edie (Evanston: Northwestern University Press, 1963)
1955	Les aventures de la dialectique (Paris: Gallimard, 1955)	Adventures of the Dialectic – trans. by Joseph Bien (Evanston: Northwestern University Press, 1973; London: Heinemann, 1974)
1958	Les Sciences de l'homme et la phénoménologie (Paris: Centre de Documentation Universitaire, 1958, 1975)	Phenomenology and the Sciences of Man – trans. by John Wild in The Primacy of Perception ed. by James Edie (Evanston: Northwestern University Press, 1964), 43–95
1960	Éloge de la Philosophie et autres essais (Paris: Gallimard, 1960)	In Praise of Philosophy and Other Essays – trans. by John Wild, James M. Edie and John O'Neill (Northwestern University Press, 1988)
1960	Signes (Paris: Gallimard, 1960)	Signs – trans. by Richard McCleary (Evanston: Northwestern University Press, 1964)
1961	L'Œil et l'esprit (Paris: Gallimard, 1961)	Eye and Mind – trans. by Carleton Dallery in The Primacy of Perception ed. by James Edie (Evanston: Northwestern University Press, 1964), 159–190; revised translation by Michael Smith in The Merleau-Ponty Aesthetics Reader (1993), 121-149
1964	Le Visible et l'invisible, suivi de notes de travail – edited by Claude Lefort (Paris: Gallimard, 1964)	The Visible and the Invisible, Followed by Working Notes – trans. by Alphonso Lingis (Evanston: Northwestern University Press, 1968)
1968	Résumés de cours, Collège de France 1952-1960 (Paris: Gallimard, 1968)	Themes from the Lectures at the Collège de France, 1952-1960 – trans. by John O'Neill (Evanston: Northwestern University Press, 1970)
1969	La Prose du monde (Paris: Gallimard, 1969)	The Prose of the World – trans. by John O'Neill (Evanston: Northwestern University Press, 1973; London: Heinemann, 1974)

== See also ==
- Embodied phenomenology
- Enactivism
- Habit
- Post-structuralism

== Sources ==
- Abram, D. (1988). "Merleau-Ponty and the Voice of the Earth" Environmental Ethics 10, no. 2 (Summer 1988): 101–20.
- Abram, D. (1996). The Spell of the Sensuous: Perception and Language in a More-than-Human World, New York: Pantheon Books.
- Alloa, E. (2017) Resistance of the Sensible World. An Introduction to Merleau-Ponty, New York: Fordham University Press.
- Alloa, E., F. Chouraqui & R. Kaushik (2019) (eds.) Merleau-Ponty and Contemporary Philosophy, Albany: SUNY Press.
- Barbaras, R. (2004) The Being of the Phenomenon. Merleau-Ponty's Ontology Bloomington: Indiana University Press.
- Carbone, M. (2004) The Thinking of the Sensible. Merleau-Ponty's A-Philosophy, Evanston: Northwestern University Press.
- Clark, A. (1997) Being There: Putting Brain, Body, and World Together Again. Cambridge, MA: MIT Press.
- Dillon, M. C. (1997) Merleau-Ponty's Ontology. Evanston: Northwestern University Press.
- Gallagher, S. (2003) How the Body Shapes the Mind. Oxford: Oxford University Press.
- Guilherme, Alexandre and Morgan, W. John, 'Maurice Merleau-Ponty (1908-1961)-dialogue as being present to the other'. Chapter 6 in Philosophy, Dialogue, and Education: Nine modern European philosophers, Routledge, London and New York, pp. 89–108, ISBN 978-1-138-83149-0.
- Johnson, G., Smith, M. B. (eds.) (1993) The Merleau-Ponty Aesthetics Reader: Philosophy and Painting, Chicago: Northwestern UP 1993.
- Landes, D. (2013) Merleau-Ponty and the Paradoxes of Expression, New York-London: Bloomsbury.
- Lawlor, L., Evans, F. (eds.) (2000) Chiasms: Merleau-Ponty's Notion of Flesh, Albany: SUNY Press.
- Petitot, J., Varela, F., Pachoud, B. and Roy, J-M. (eds.) (1999) Naturalizing Phenomenology: Issues in Contemporary Phenomenology and Cognitive Science. Stanford: Stanford University Press.
- Toadvine, T. (2009) Merleau-Ponty's Philosophy of Nature. Evanston: Northwestern University Press.
- Tilliette, X. (1970) Maurice Merleau-Ponty ou la mesure de l'homme, Seghers, 1970.
- Varela, F. J., Thompson, E. and Rosch, E. (1991) The Embodied Mind: Cognitive Science and Human Experience. Cambridge: MIT Press.
