= Izydora Dąmbska =

Polish philosopher (1904–1983)

- Born: 3 January 1904; Lviv
- Died: 18 June 1983 (aged 79); Kraków
- Occupation: Philosopher

Academic background
- Education: University of Lviv
- Doctoral advisor: Kazimierz Twardowski

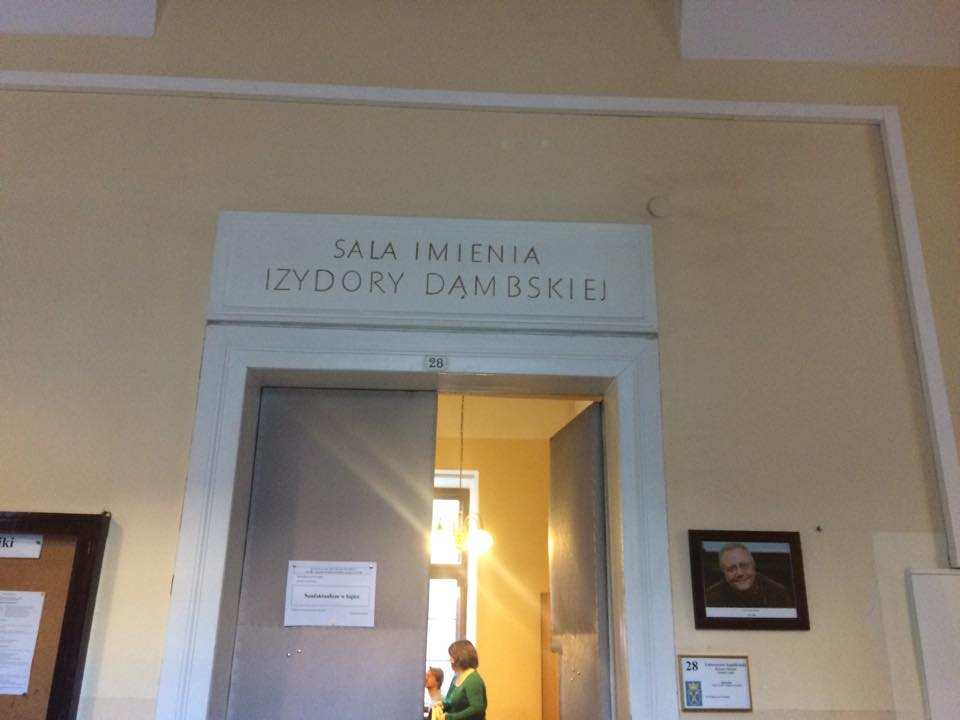
The Izydora Dąmbska Hall at the Collegium Broscianum of the Jagiellonian University

Izydora Maria Józefa Dąmbska (3 January 1904 – 18 June 1983) was a philosopher, logician, epistemologist, translator and poet related to the Lwów–Warsaw school. She was student and assistant of Kazimierz Twardowski.

== Biography ==
She came from the nobility; the daughter of Stanisław Dąmbski (1865–1941), and Antonina née Zaleska.

She studied philosophy (at the seminar of Kazimierz Twardowski, at Kazimierz Ajdukiewicz, Roman Ingarden and Mścisław Wartenberg) and Polish philology (at Tadeusz Lehr-Spławiński, Juliusz Kleiner and Ryszard Gansiniec) at the University of Lviv. In 1927 she obtained doctorate in philosophy upon dissertation Teoria sądu E. Gobblota written under the supervision of Kazimierz Twardowski.

From 1926 to 1930, she was an assistant at the Department of Philosophy at the Faculty of Humanities of the University of Lviv. In 1930–1931 she went on an eight-month research trip to Austria, Germany and France; visiting Vienna, Berlin and Paris; the trip was financed from the scholarship of the Fund for National Culture. After returning, she worked at the University Library in Lviv and in secondary education, teaching introductions to philosophy, pedagogical subjects, and the Polish language. She passed professorial exam for teachers in 1927.

From 1928, she was a member of the Polish Philosophical Society; she was a member of its board from 1937. In 1938–1939, together with Daniela Gromska, she edited the journal Ruch Filozoficzny. At the same time, she collaborated on compiling a Polish philosophical bibliography for the publishing house of the International Institute of Philosophy and for the American publisher Philos. Abstracts.

In 1946 she obtained habilitation at the University of Warsaw upon dissertation Irracjonalizm a poznanie naukowe. From autumn of 1946 she lectured at the University of Warsaw. Zbigniew Herbert dedicated her a poem Potęga smaku.

== Works ==
- O narzędziach i przedmiotach poznania. Z teorii instrumentalnego poznania. O filozofii lingwistycznej. Warszawa: Państwowe Wydawnictwo Naukowe. 1967.
- Dwa studia o Platonie. Wrocław: Ossolineum. 1972.
- Znaki i myśli. Wybór pism z semiotyki, teorii nauki i filozofii. Warszawa: Państwowe Wydawnictwo Naukowe PWN. 1975.
- O konwencjach i konwencjonalizmie. Wrocław: Ossolineum. 1975.
- Knowledge, Language and Silence. Selected Papers. Leiden-Boston: Brill-Rodopi. 2015.
- Tadeusz Półchłopek, ed. (2023). Wiersze młodzieńcze. Wydawnictwo Uniwersytetu Rzeszowskiego. ISBN 978-83-8277-127-5.

=== Editions ===
- Szkice filozoficzne. Romanowi Ingardenowi w darze. Warszawa. 1964.
- Kazimierz Twardowski, O zadaniach etyki naukowej. Wykładów z etyki część III. Warszawa. 1973.
- Kazimierz Twardowski, Wykłady z etyki. Warszawa. 1974.

=== Translations ===
- Witwicki, Władysław (1939). La foi des éclairés. Translated by Izydora Dąmbska. Paris: Libraire Félix Alcan.

== Bibliography ==
- Perzanowski, Jerzy (1984). "Pogranicze logiki i filozofii w pracach profesor Izydory Dąmbskiej". Ruch Filozoficzny. 41 (4). Toruń: 311–322.
- Pelc, Jerzy (1986). "Izydora Dąmbska". Studia Semiotyczne (14–15). Wrocław: Ossolineum: 45–51.
- Miklaszewska, Justyna (2000). "Izydora Dąmbska o oświeceniowej filozofii języka". In Jerzy Perzanowski; Andrzej Pietruszczak (eds.). Logika & filozofia logiczna. Toruń: Wydawnictwo Uniwersytetu Mikołaja Kopernika. pp. 423–433.
- Jerzy Perzanowski, ed. (2001). Izydora Dąmbska (1904–1983). Materiały z sympozjum “Non est necesse vivere, necesse est philosophari” Kraków, 18–19.XII.1998 r. Ludzie nauki. Kraków: Polska Akademia Umiejętności. ISBN 8388857142.
- Dąbek, Dariusz (2007). Problem konwencjonalizmu i irracjonalizmu w epistemologii Izydory Dąmbskiej. Częstochowa: Wydawnictwo im. Stanisława Podobińskiego Akademii im. Jana Długosza. ISBN 9788374550758.
- Jerzy Perzanowski, ed. (2009). Rozum – serce – smak. Pamięci profesor Izydory Dąmbskiej (1904–1983). Kraków: Wydawnictwo WAM.
- Orbik, Zbigniew (2018). Filozofia Izydory Dąmbskiej; The philosophy of Izydora Dąmbska. Wydawnictwo Politechniki Śląskiej. ISBN 978-83-7880-543-4.
- Radosław Kuliniak, ed. (2024). "Izydora Dąmbska (1904–1983)". Ruch Filozoficzny. 80 (2). Archived from the original on 6 March 2025.
- Kuliniak, Radosław; Pandura, Mariusz; Ratajczak, Łukasz (2024). Izydora Dąmbska (1904–1983). Najlepsza z dobrych. Część pierwsza: lata 1904–1945. Daimonion. Wydawnictwo Marek Derewiecki. ISBN 978-83-66941-89-2.
- Pandura, Mariusz; Ratajczak, Łukasz (2025). Izydora Dąmbska (1904–1983). Najlepsza z dobrych. Część druga: lata 1945–1983. Daimonion. Wydawnictwo Marek Derewiecki. ISBN 978-83-68182-10-1.
