= Maria Kokoszyńska-Lutmanowa =

Logician, philosopher of language and epistemologist

- Born: 6 December 1905; Bóbrka, Austria-Hungary
- Died: 30 June 1981 (aged 75); Wrocław, Poland
- Other names: Maria Lutman, Maria Lutman-Kokoszynska
- Spouse: Roman Lutman

Maria Kokoszyńska-Lutmanowa (born Maria Kokoszyńska, 6 December 1905 – 30 June 1981) was a Polish logician, philosopher of language and epistemologist. She belonged to the third generation of the Lwów–Warsaw school. She is mostly known as the author of the important argumentation against neopositivism of the Vienna Circle as well as one of the main critics of relativistic theories of truth. She was also noted for popularising Tarski's works on semantics.

Kokoszyńska studied philosophy in Lwów under Kazimierz Ajdukiewicz (and Kazimierz Twardowski) at the Jan Kazimierz University, and at the University of Cambridge under Ludwig Wittgenstein.

She later held the chair of logic at the University of Wrocław.

== Selected publications ==
- Kokoszyńska, M., (1936), 'Über den absoluten Wahrheitsbegriff und einige andere semantische Begriffe', Erkenntnis 6, 143–156.
- Kokoszyńska, M., (1948), 'What means "relativity of truth"?', Studia Philosophica 3, 167–176.
- Kokoszyńska, M., (1951), 'A refutation of the relativism of truth', Studia Philosophica 4, 1–57.

*For a complete listing of Kokoszyńska's publications see Jan Zygmunt's Bibliography.
