= Polish Logic =

1967 book by Kazimierz Ajdukiewicz

Polish Logic is an anthology of papers by several authors—Kazimierz Ajdukiewicz, Leon Chwistek, Stanislaw Jaskowski, Zbigniew Jordan, Tadeusz Kotarbinski, Stanisław Leśniewski, Jan Łukasiewicz, Jerzy Słupecki, and Mordchaj Wajsberg—published in 1967 and covering the period 1920–1939. The work focuses on the contributions of Polish logicians, more particularly, mathematical logicians, to modern logic.

== Library of Congress cataloging data ==
LC Control No.: 67106639
Type of Material: Book (Print, Microform, Electronic, etc.)
Personal Name: McCall, Storrs, comp.
Main Title: Polish logic, 1920-1939 papers by Ajdukiewicz [and others];
Published/Created: Oxford, Clarendon P., 1967.
Description: [2] viii, 406 p. 23 cm.
Subjects: Logic, Symbolic and mathematical--Addresses, essays, lectures.
LC Classification: BC135 .M18

== See also ==
- Lwów–Warsaw school
