= Bronisław Bandrowski =

Polish philosopher and psychologist

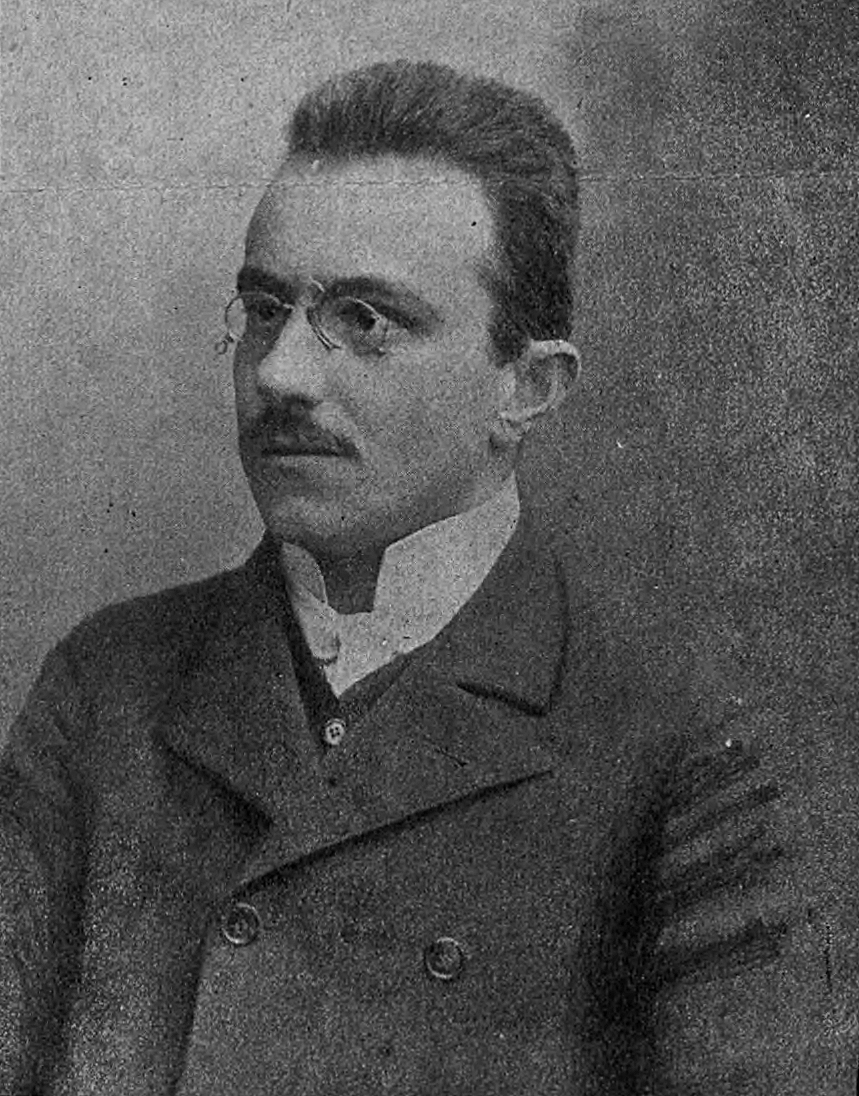
- Born: 27 May 1879; Mościska, Austrian Galicia, Austria-Hungary
- Died: 27 July 1914 (aged 35); High Tatras, Austria-Hungary

Education
- Education: Lwów University

Philosophical work
- Era: Contemporary philosophy
- Region: Western philosophy
- School: Lwów–Warsaw school Analytical philosophy
- Main interests: Philosophical logic, semiotics, experimental psychology, phenomenology

Bronisław Bandrowski (Polish: [banˈdrɔfskʲi]; 27 May 1879 – 27 July 1914) was a Polish philosopher and psychologist. He was one of the pupils of Kazimierz Twardowski. Drawing from his mentor's theories and the tradition of the Lwów–Warsaw school, his works dealt with the problem of induction. Bandrowski was also noted for his death in the Tatra Mountains near Zakopane.

== Biography ==
Bandrowski was born on 27 May 1879 in Mościska (Galicia, Austria-Hungary). He was the son of Alfred Bandrowski, a court clerk, and Joanna née Zajączkowska. He was also the nephew of the Polish opera tenor Aleksander Bandrowski and the cousin of the writer Juliusz Kaden-Bandrowski.

After finishing high school, Bandrowski took classical philology and philosophy at the University of Lviv. In 1905 he obtained a doctorate in philosophy. In the years 1905–1906 he supplemented his psychological studies in Göttingen and London. Stay at G.E. Müller in Göttingen influenced his interest in experimental psychology. Bandrowski became one of the founding members of the Polish Philosophical Society and an active member and editor of the journal Ruch Filozoficzny (Philosophical Movement).

== Work ==
Bandrowski's doctoral dissertation, On methods of induction research, is considered one of his most notable works. It included a critical analysis of the intrinsic qualities of induction. In this paper, he also maintained that – to analyze induction – the question concerning the qualities of the notion of cause must first be answered.

Together with Władysław Witwicki, Bandrowski developed a model of psychology based on Franz Brentano's theory on phenomenology. It included an analysis of Edmund Husserl's works (e.g. theory of content and the Phenomenon of thinking). Bandrowski rejected the German philosopher's method in his embrace of the descriptive-psychological method and logical analysis.

Bandrowski also authored the report containing the discussions of a 1912 Kraków congress organized by the Neurological and Psychiatric Section of the Warsaw Medical Society. The report was devoted to Sigmund Freud's concept of hysteria as well as contemporaneous issues concerning the psychoanalytical movement. Bandrowski argued that there is no significant difference between the results of Freud's theory and the findings of contemporary psychological theories if his theory is formulated using the terminology of the latter.

== Death ==
In July 1914, Bandrowski went on a hiking trip in Tatra Mountains near Zakopane together with his sister and fiance Anna Hackbeilówna. The three got lost while descending Czarny Gąsienicowy Pond. Hackbeilówna fell to her death in the descent while Bandrowski and his sister got trapped on a rocky ledge called Drege's Gully. Having lost hope, Bandrowski threw himself into an abyss after three days waiting for help. His sister was later rescued by a TOPR rescue expedition led by Mariusz Zaruski.
