= Lwów–Warsaw school =

School of thought

The Lwów–Warsaw school (Polish: Szkoła Lwowsko-Warszawska) was an interdisciplinary school (mainly philosophy, logic and psychology) founded by Kazimierz Twardowski in 1895 in Lwów, Austro-Hungary (now Lviv, Ukraine).

Though its members represented a variety of disciplines, from mathematics through logic to psychology, the Lwów–Warsaw school is widely considered to have been a philosophical movement. It has produced some of the leading logicians of the twentieth century such as Jan Łukasiewicz, Stanisław Leśniewski, and Alfred Tarski, among others. Its members did not only contribute to the techniques of logic but also to various domains that belong to the philosophy of language.

== History ==
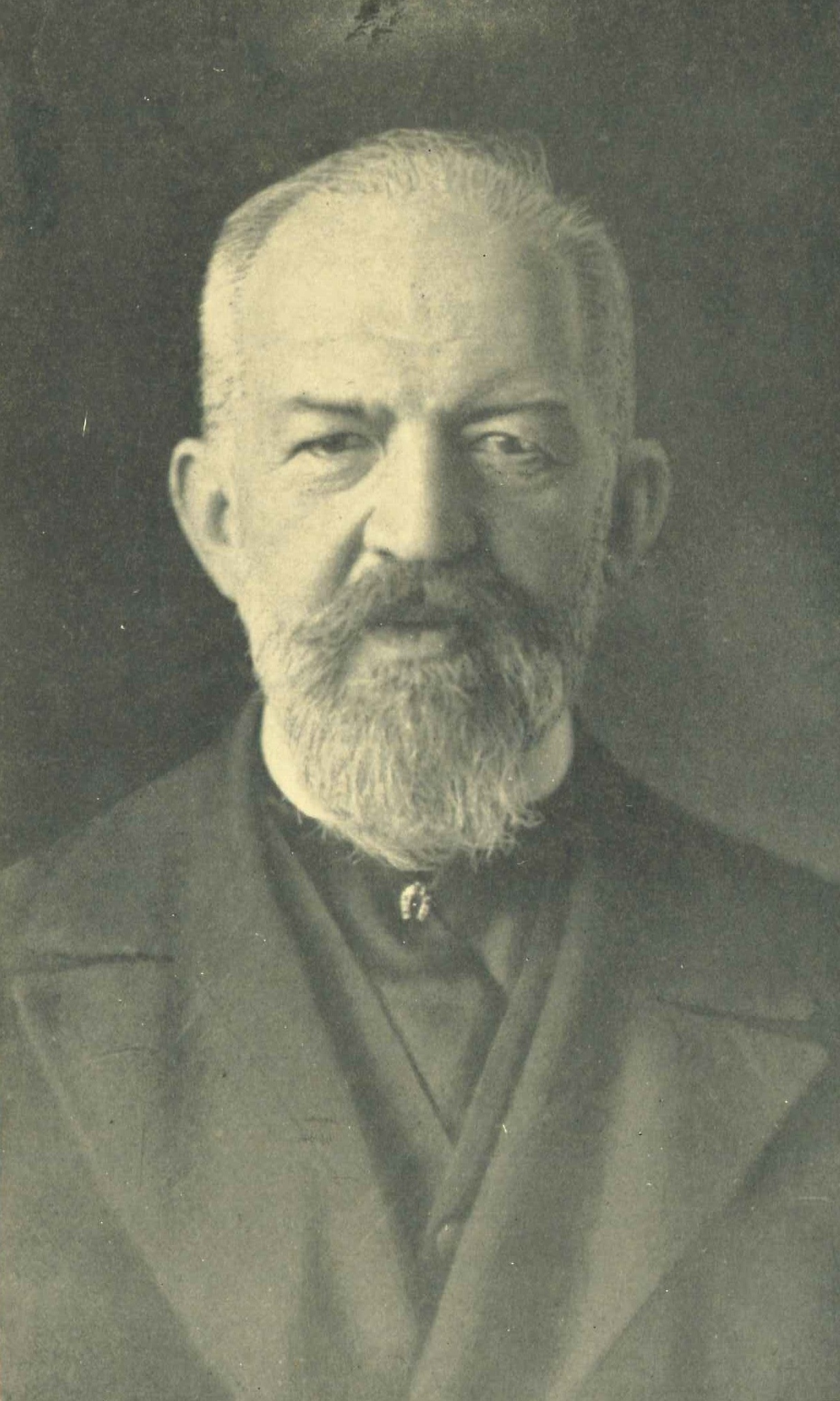
Kazimierz Twardowski

Polish philosophy and the Lwów–Warsaw school were considerably influenced by Franz Brentano and his pupils Kazimierz Twardowski, Anton Marty, Alexius Meinong, and Edmund Husserl. Twardowski founded the philosophical school when he became the chair of the Lviv University.

Principal topics of interest to the Lwów–Warsaw school included formal ontology, mereology, and universal or categorial grammar.

The Lwów-Warsaw School began as a general philosophical school but steadily moved toward logic. The Lwów–Warsaw school of logic lay at the origin of Polish logic and was closely associated with or was part of the Warsaw School of Mathematics. According to Jan Woleński, a decisive factor in the school's development was the view that the future of the Polish school of mathematics depended on the research connected with the new branches of the field such as set theory and topology, which are closely related to mathematical logic. The "philosophical branch" followed Twardowski's tradition and produced notable thinkers such as Bronisław Bandrowski, who addressed the problem of induction and Tadeusz Kotarbiński, who is known for developing Reism.

In the 1930s Alfred Tarski initiated contacts with the Vienna Circle. Tarski, the most prominent member of the Lwów–Warsaw school, has been ranked as one of the four greatest logicians of all time, along with Aristotle, Gottlob Frege, and Kurt Gödel.

The school's work was interrupted by the outbreak of World War II. Despite this, its members went on to fundamentally influence modern science, notably mathematics and logic, in the post-war period. Tarski's description of semantic truth, for instance, has revolutionized logic and philosophy.

In contemporary Polish learning, the philosopher Jan Woleński considers himself close to the School's heritage. In 2013 Woleński was awarded by the Foundation for Polish Science for his comprehensive analysis of the work of the Lwów–Warsaw school and for placing its achievements within the international discourse of contemporary analytic philosophy.

== Members ==
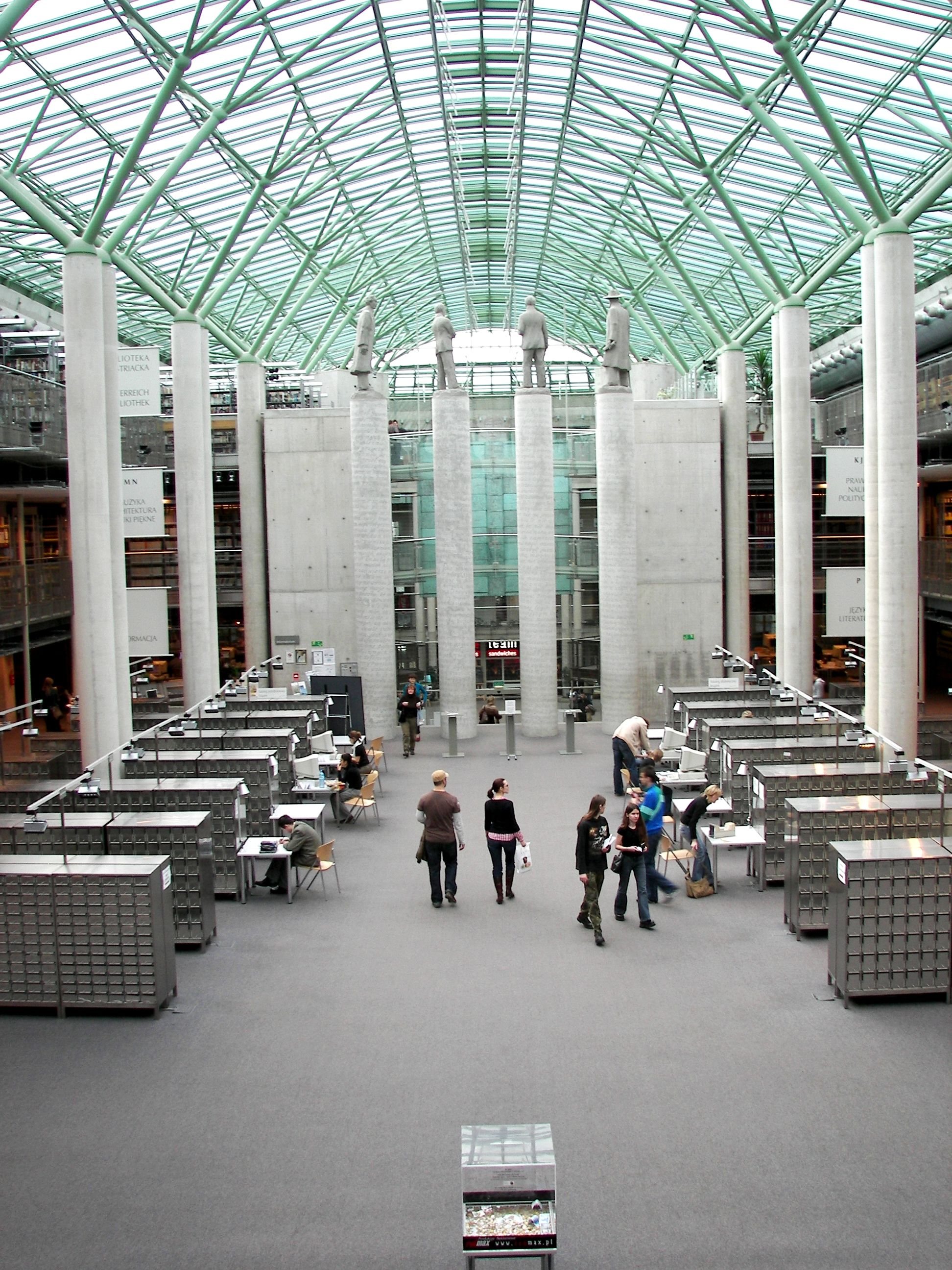
Warsaw University Library. Atop columns: statues (facing entrance) of Lwów–Warsaw school philosophers: Kazimierz Twardowski, Jan Łukasiewicz, Alfred Tarski, and Stanisław Leśniewski

Many of the School's members worked in more than one field.

- Kazimierz Ajdukiewicz
- Bronisław Bandrowski
- Leopold Blaustein
- Józef Maria Bocheński
- Leon Chwistek
- Tadeusz Czeżowski
- Izydora Dąmbska
- Eugénie Ginsberg
- Janina Hosiasson-Lindenbaum
- Stanisław Jaśkowski
- Maria Kokoszyńska-Lutmanowa
- Tadeusz Kotarbiński
- Czesław Lejewski
- Stanisław Leśniewski
- Jan Łukasiewicz
- Maria Ossowska
- Alfred Tarski
- Kazimierz Twardowski
- Władysław Witwicki
- Zygmunt Zawirski

== See also ==
- History of philosophy in Poland
- Polish School of Mathematics
- School of Brentano

== Bibliography ==
- Brożek, A., A. Chybińska, J. Jadacki, and Jan Woleński, eds., Tradition of the Lvov-Warsaw School. Ideas and Continuations, Leiden, Boston, 2015.
- Brożek, A., F. Stadler, and Jan Woleński, eds., The Significance of the Lvov-Warsaw School in the European Culture, Wien, 2017.
- Coniglione, F., Polish Scientific Philosophy: The Lvov–Warsaw School, Amsterdam, Atlanta, 1993.
- Drabarek, A., Jan Woleński, and M.M. Radzki, eds., Interdisciplinary investigations into the Lvov-Warsaw School, Cham, 2019.
- Feferman, Anita Burdman; Feferman, Solomon (2004). Alfred Tarski: Life and Logic. Cambridge University Press. ISBN 978-0-521-80240-6. OCLC 54691904.
- Garrido, Á., and U. Wybraniec-Skardowska, eds., The Lvov-Warsaw School. Past and Present, Basel, 2018.
- Jadacki, J.J., Polish Analytical Philosophy, Warsaw, 2009.
- Jadacki, J., and J. Paśniczek, eds., The Lvov-Warsaw School – The new generation, Poznań Studies in the Philosophy of Science and Humanities, vol. 89, Polish Analytical Philosophy, vol. VI, Amsterdam, Atlanta, 2006 ISBN 978-90-420-2068-9.
- Jordan, Z., The Development of Mathematical Logic and of Logical Positivism in Poland between Two Wars, Oxford, 1945.
- Kijania-Place, K., and Jan Woleński, eds., The Lvov-Warsaw School and Contemporary Philosophy, Dordrecht, 1998.
- Marion M., W. Miśkiewicz, S. Lapointe, and Jan Woleński, eds., The Golden Age of Polish Philosophy: Kazimierz Twardowski's Philosophical Legacy, Dordrecht, 2009 ISBN 90-481-2400-X.
- McFarland, A., J. McFarland, and J.T. Smith, eds., Alfred Tarski: Early Work in Poland – Geometry and Teaching, Basel, 2010.
- Skolimowski, H., Polish Analytical Philosophy. London, 1967.
- Smith, B., Austrian Philosophy, Chicago, 1994.
- Szaniawski, Klemens, ed., The Vienna Circle and the Lvov–Warsaw School, Dordrecht, Boston, London, 1989.
- Woleński, Jan, Logic and Philosophy in the Lvov–Warsaw School, Dordrecht, Boston, Lancaster, Reidel, 1989.
