= Stanisław Jaśkowski =

Polish logician and philosopher (1906–1965)

- Born: 22 April 1906; Warsaw, Congress Poland
- Died: 16 November 1965 (aged 59); Warsaw, Poland
- Education: University of Warsaw
- Known for: Natural deduction Paraconsistent logic Proof theory Formal semantics
- Spouse: Aniela Holewińska
- Scientific career
- Fields: Logic
- Workplaces: Nicolaus Copernicus University in Toruń
- Thesis: Rules of Inference by Means of Assumptions (1932)
- Doctoral advisor: Jan Łukasiewicz

Stanisław Jaśkowski (Polish pronunciation: [staˈɲsvaf jaɕˈkɔfskʲi]; 22 April 1906, in Warsaw – 16 November 1965, in Warsaw) was a Polish logician who made important contributions to proof theory and formal semantics. He was a student of Jan Łukasiewicz and a member of the Lwów–Warsaw School of Logic. He is regarded as one of the founders of natural deduction, which he discovered independently of Gerhard Gentzen in the 1930s. He is also known for his research into paraconsistent logic. He was the President (rector) of the Nicolaus Copernicus University in Toruń.

== Life and career ==
He was born in 1906 in Warsaw to father Feliks Jaśkowski and mother Kazimiera (née Dzierzbicka). In 1924, he graduated from high school in Zakopane and enrolled at the University of Warsaw to study mathematics. He was taught mathematical logic under Jan Łukasiewicz and participated in the Polish Mathematicians' Congresses in Lviv (1927) and Vilnius (1931). In 1932, Jaśkowski earned his doctorate on the basis of his thesis Reguły wnioskowania za pomocą założeń (Rules of Inference by Means of Assumptions) written under the supervision of Łukasiewicz.

After the outbreak of World War II, he participated in the September Campaign as a volunteer. In 1942, he was briefly imprisoned by the Germans. In 1945, he continued his scientific career at the University of Toruń where co-organized the Departments of Mathematics, Physics and Chemistry. In 1946, he defended his habilitation at the Jagiellonian University and subsequently assumed the post of the head of the Faculty of Mathematical Logic at the University of Toruń.

Since 1950, he collaborated with the State Institute of Mathematics of the Polish Academy of Sciences (PAN). Between 1959–1962, he served as the Rector of the University. He was among the founders and served as the first President of the Polish Mathematical Society's branch in Toruń.

Jaśkowski is considered to be one of the founders of natural deduction, which he discovered independently of Gerhard Gentzen in the 1930s. Gentzen's approach initially became more popular with logicians because it could be used to prove the cut-elimination theorem. However, Jaśkowski's is closer to the way that proofs are done in practice. He was also one of the first to propose a formal calculus of inconsistency-tolerant (or paraconsistent) logic. Furthermore, Jaśkowski was a pioneer in the investigation of both intuitionistic logic and free logic.

He died in 1965 in Warsaw and was buried at the Powązki Cemetery.

== Works ==
- On the Rules of Suppositions in Formal Logic Studia Logica 1, 1934 pp. 5–32 (reprinted in: Storrs McCall (ed.), Polish Logic 1920-1939, Oxford University Press, 1967 pp. 232–258
- Investigations into the System of Intuitionist Logic 1936 (translated in: Storrs McCall (ed.), Polish Logic 1920-1939, Oxford University Press, 1967 pp. 259–263
- A propositional Calculus for Inconsistent Deductive Systems 1948 (reprinted in: Studia Logica, 24 1969, pp 143–157 and in: Logic and Logical Philosophy 7, 1999 pp. 35–56)
- On the Discussive Conjunction in the Propositional Calculus for Inconsistent Deductive Systems 1949 (reprinted in: Logic and Logical Philosophy 7, 1999 pp. 57–59)
- On Formulas in which no Individual Variable occurs more than Twice, Journal of Symbolic Logic, 31, 1966, pp. 1–6)

in Polish

- O symetrii w zdobnictwie i przyrodzie - matematyczna teoria ornamentów (English title: On Symmetry in Art and Nature), PWS, Warszawa, 1952 (book 168 pages)
- Matematyczna teoria ornamentów (English title: Mathematical Theory of Ornaments), PWN, Warszawa, 1957 (book 100 pages)

== See also ==
- List of Polish mathematicians
- Timeline of Polish science and technology

== Sources ==
- Jerzy Perzanowski (1999). "Fifty Years of Parainconsistent Logics" (PDF). Logic and Logical Philosophy. 7: 21–24. Archived from the original (PDF) on 2006-04-04.
- Woleński, Jan (2003). "Lvov-Warsaw School". The Stanford Encyclopedia of Philosophy (Summer 2003 Edition).
- Jerzy Kotas, August Pieczkowski. Scientific works of Stanisław Jaśkowski, Studia Logica 21, 1967, 7-15
