= Robert von Zimmermann =

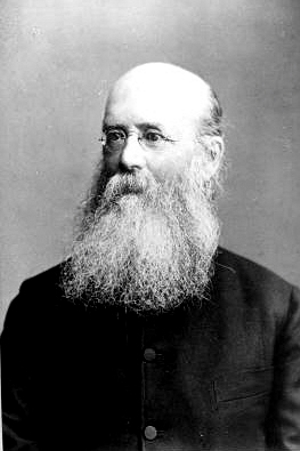
Robert von Zimmermann

Robert von Zimmermann (born Robert Zimmermann, 2 November 1824, Prague – 1 September 1898, Prague) was an Austrian-Czech philosopher.

The mathematician and philosopher Bernard Bolzano, entrusted his unfinished work, Grössenlehre ("Theory of Quantity", a philosophical foundation for mathematics), which had not been completed at the time of his death in 1848, to von Zimmermann who was 24 years old. Zimmermann had been a student of Bolzano's.

Since Zimmermann's interests were more in the area of philosophy as he had been appointed to the chair of philosophy at the University of Prague in 1852, he did not do much with Bolzano's papers. Most of the remaining manuscripts stayed in Zimmermann's possession until 1882 when he gave them to the Austrian Academy of Sciences (Kaiserliche Akademie der Wissenschaften in Wien).

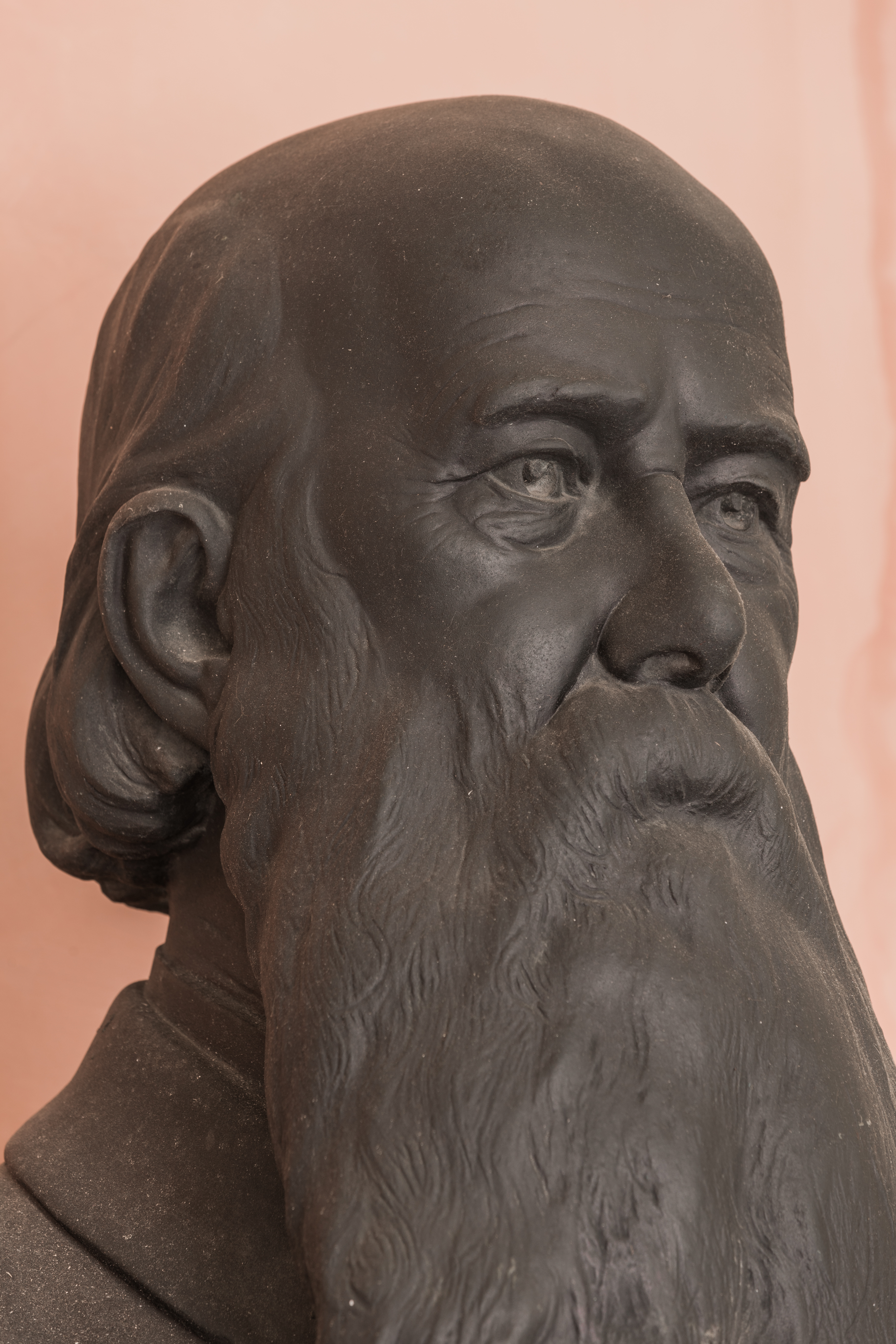
Robert von Zimmermann (Nr. 22) - Bronze bust in the Arkadenhof, University of Vienna - 0324

Robert von Zimmermann taught at the University of Vienna from 1861. One of his doctoral students was Kazimierz Twardowski.

== Works ==
- Philosophische Propädeutik, 1852
- Geschichte der Ästhetik als philosophische Wissenschaft, 1858
- Allgemeine Ästhetik als Formwissenschaft (General Aesthetics as a Science of Form), 1865
- Studien und Kritiken zur Philosophie und Ästhetik, 2 vols., 1870
- Anthroposophie, 1882
