= On the Content and Object of Presentations =

1894 book by Kazimierz Twardowski

- Author: Kazimierz Twardowski
- Original title: Zur Lehre vom Inhalt und Gegenstand der Vorstellungen
- Language: German
- Subject: Mental acts
- Published: 1894
- Publication place: Austria
- Media type: Print
- ISBN: 978-9024719266

On the Content and Object of Presentations (German: Zur Lehre vom Inhalt und Gegenstand der Vorstellungen, "On the Doctrine of the Content and Object of Presentations") is an 1894 book by the Polish philosopher Kazimierz Twardowski, a student of the philosopher Franz Brentano.

== Reception ==
The philosopher Reinhardt Grossmann has observed that On the Content and Object of Presentations greatly influenced the course of philosophy. The philosopher Alexius Meinong adopted Twardowski's distinction between the individual mental act, its content and its object, and his contention that there are many objects of acts that do not exist. This helped Meinong to clearly separate presentations from the objects which they intend.

== Editions ==
English translations

- Kasimir Twardowski, On the Content and Object of Presentations. A Psychological Investigation, translation and introduction by Reinhardt Grossmann, The Hague: Martinus Nijhoff, 1977.
