= Mariusz Zaruski =

Polish general (1867–1941)

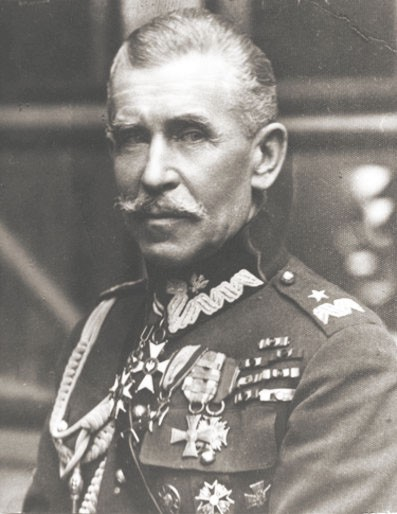
- Born: 18 January 1867; Dumanów, Russian Empire
- Died: 8 April 1941 (aged 74); Kherson, USSR
- Military career
- Allegiance: Austria-Hungary; Second Polish Republic
- Branch: Austro-Hungarian Army; Polish Armed Forces
- Service years: 1914-1941
- Rank: Generał brygady (Brigadier general)
- Units: Polish Legions; 11th Legions Uhlan Regiment; 23rd Grodno Uhlan Regiment
- Commands: Commander of the Regiment; Adjutant of the President of Poland
- Conflicts: First World War; Polish-Soviet War
- Awards

Mariusz Zaruski (18 January 1867 – 8 April 1941) was a brigadier-general in the Polish Army, a pioneer of Polish sports yachting, an outstanding climber of the winter and caves of Tatra Mountains. He was a photographer, painter, poet and writer, a seamen and traveler, a conspirator, legionnaire and lancer in Polish cavalry.

During his active life, he was a devoted social activist, sportsman and teacher.

== Biography ==
Zaruski was born on 18 January 1867 in Dumanowo near the Kamieniec Podolski in Poland. During his youth at Odessa University, where he studied mathematics and physics, he was attracted to maritime activities. He worked as a seaman on various ships. He visited distant regions including Siberia, China, Japan, India, Egypt and Syria.

For his participation in a Polish patriotic anti-Russian organization, the Russian government exiled him to Arkhangelsk in 1894. There, while a prisoner, he was able to graduate from the Seaman School. Conditionally, he was allowed to work on the merchant ship Derzhava. On his first sea journey on the ship, he went to Norway with a log and fur cargo. Later he became captain of the ship Nadezhda.

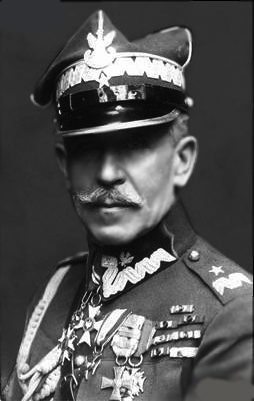
Mariusz Zaruski

After finishing his prison term, Zaruski returned to Odessa, where he lived for two years. There he married Izabela Kietlińska. Later, he moved to Kraków, where between 1901 and 1906, he studied painting at the Academy of Fine Arts. In 1907, after graduation, the couple moved to Zakopane for Izabela's health.

For many years, Mariusz Zaruski worked in Zakopane as a mountain guide for tourists and rescues. He organized the Tatra Mountain Rescue Service. In his articles in Polish newspapers, he publicized and popularized the tourism of the Zakopane region. He was the first to ski down from Kozi Wierch and Kościelec mountains. Zaruski was also noted for leading a rescue expedition that saved Maria Bandrowski, who was trapped in the Tatra Mountains with her brother, the Polish philosopher Bronisław Bandrowski.

At the start of the First World War, he organized 11th Polish Cavalry Regiment and became its commander. For his bravery during the offensive on Wilno City on 16 April 1919, he was decorated with the highest Polish military distinction, the Order of Virtuti Militari, 5th Class, and several times with the Cross of Valour. He ended up his military career as a brigadier-general and Adjutant to Polish President Stanisław Wojciechowski. He retired before the May Revolt in 1926.

In his retirement, he devoted his time to popularize moral, economic and political benefits of Poland's access to the Baltic Sea. He introduced the Polish elite to the sport of yachting. Through his teaching he attracted countless number of Polish youth to seamanship and yachting.

Together with Antoni Aleksandrowicz, he organized the Yacht Club of Poland. Thanks to his government connections, he was able to acquire for the club the first ocean-going yacht in Poland's history, Witeź. On his initiative, the Sea and River League and the Committee of National Flotilla were established. The committee founded the sailing ship Dar Pomorza. He was an organizer of the Inspectorate of Youth Marine Education. He helped to establish the Marine Terminology Commission, which included representatives from Marine Academy and universities. The Commission edited six volumes of the Polish – English – French – German - Russian Marine Dictionary. In Poland, before the Second World War, the Boy Scouts movement was an important part of marine education among Polish youth.

General Zaruski played a leading role as a seamanship instructor for Polish Scouts units in Jastarnia, located on the shore of the Baltic Sea. He used to say that the hardship of a sailor's duties strengthened the sailor's moral character. In 1935 he became captain of the schooner Zawisza Czarny (ship). At the same time, he was elected President of the Polish Sailing Association. During his presidency, youth at universities, the Boy Scouts and yacht clubs all over Poland were integrated in one mass movement devoted to seamanship and marine education. As captain of Zawisza Czarny, he was treated with such respect and adoration by youths that they called him no other than “Sir General”. His last voyage on Zawisza Czarny was in 1939.

Deliberately, despite the fact that he could leave Poland at the outbreak of the Second World War, he did not abandon his motherland. He was arrested, then imprisoned by the Soviet NKVD in Lwów after the Red Army invaded Poland in September 1939. On 29 March 1941, NKVD sentenced him, as a socially dangerous element, to penal resettlement to Krasnoyarsk Krai in Siberia. He died of cholera in a Soviet prison in Kherson on 8 April 1941.

In autumn of 1991, thanks to the efforts of Związek Harcerstwa Polskiego, the Polish Scouts, the ashes of Gen. Zaruski were brought to Poland and buried in Zakopane Cemetery. He was decorated posthumously by the Polish state with the Grand Cross of Order of Poland’s Rebirth in 1997.

== Family ==
Father Seweryn, mother Eufrozyna, older brother Stanisław, younger brother Bolesław. His devoted wife: Izabella Kietlińska.

== Literary legacy ==
Includes: collection of poems and novels about the Tatra mountains titled Na bezdrożach tatrzańskich (1923) as well as his marine novels titled Wśród wichrów i fal (1935). He expressed his passion for horses in several of his poems.

He gave countless speeches, lectures and published many articles. He wrote several textbooks for sailors and first in Polish history textbook of marine navigation.

== Honours and awards ==
- Polish:
  - Silver Cross of Virtuti Militari (1922)
  - Grand Cross of the Order of Polonia Restituta (posthumously, 7 November 1997)
  - Commander's Cross of the Order of Polonia Restituta (7 November 1925)
  - Cross of Independence (12 May 1931)
  - Officer's Cross of the Order of Polonia Restituta (2 May 1923)
  - Cross of Valour (five times)
  - Gold Cross of Merit (three times)
  - Commemorative Medal for the War of 1918–1921 (1928)
  - Medal of the 10th Anniversary of Regained Independence (1928)
- Foreign:
  - Commander of the Order of the Sword (Sweden, 1923)
  - Commander of the Legion of Honour (France, 1925)
  - Commander of the Order of the White Lion (Czechoslovakia, 1926)
  - Grand Officer of the Order of St. Sava (Yugoslavia, 1927)
  - Commander of the Order of the Star of Romania (Romania)
  - Commander of the Order of Orange-Nassau (The Netherlands)
  - Knight of the Order of St. Sylvester (Holy See)

== See also ==
- Republic of Zakopane
