= University of Warsaw Library =

Academic library in Warsaw, Poland

- Biblioteka Uniwersytecka w Warszawie

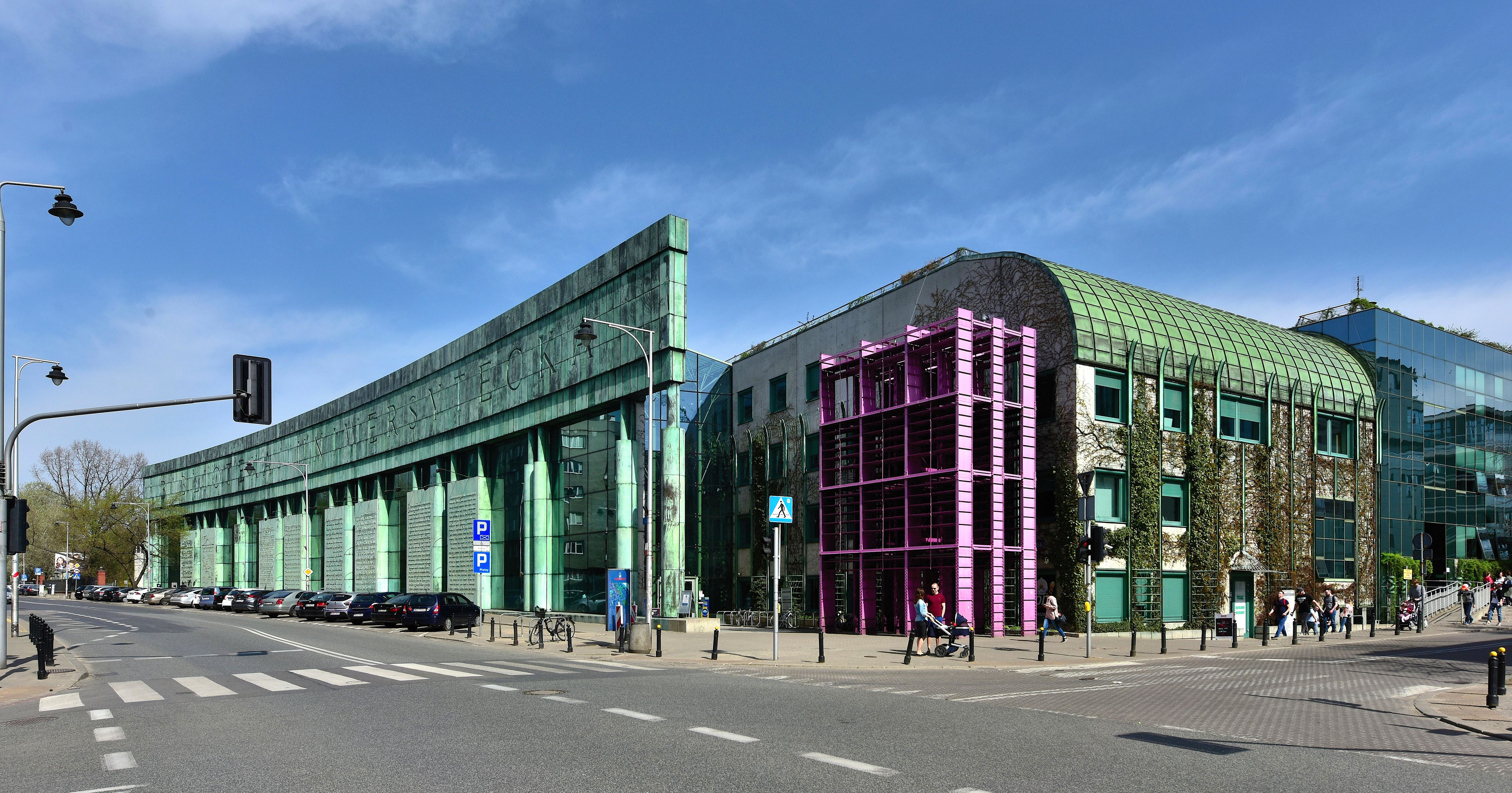
- 52°14′31.32″N 21°01′29.4″E
- Location: Warsaw, Poland
- Type: University library
- Established: 1816; 210 years ago

Collection
- Size: 6,000,000

Other information
- Director: Krzysztof Nierzwicki, Ph.D.
- Public transit access: Centrum Nauki Kopernik; 106 118 127
- Website: www.buw.uw.edu.pl

The University of Warsaw Library (Polish: Biblioteka Uniwersytecka w Warszawie, BUW) is a library of the University of Warsaw, Poland. Established in 1816 following the formation of the Royal Warsaw University, it was led by the first director Samuel Linde, a linguist and educator. By 1831, the library housed over 134,000 volumes. However, the November Uprising in 1831 led to its temporary closure and the confiscation of many books by Russian authorities. The library reopened in 1862 as the Main Library and continued to expand, requiring a new building by 1894 to accommodate its expanding collection.

During World War I, precious books and manuscripts were stolen by fleeing tsarist authorities, although most had been returned by 1921. As a result of World War II, over 130,000 volumes were damaged by fire. In the post-war period, the University of Warsaw Library focused on rebuilding its collections, significantly increasing its holdings by acquiring materials from abandoned properties. In the 1980s, it emerged as a center of free thought and anti-communist resistance, with the Solidarność movement members among its frequent visitors.

The 1990s saw the selection and construction of a new library building, designed by Marek Budzyński and Zbigniew Badowski, which opened in 1999. As of 2019, the library's collection had grown to over 6.2 million items. The library's building includes a botanical garden on its roof, designed by Irena Bajerska, which is among the largest in Europe and open to the public. The library also houses a traditional Japanese tea pavilion, Chashitsu, donated by Kyoei Steel in 2004 and used for events related to Japanese tea culture. This pavilion remains the only original example of traditional Japanese architecture in Poland.

== History ==
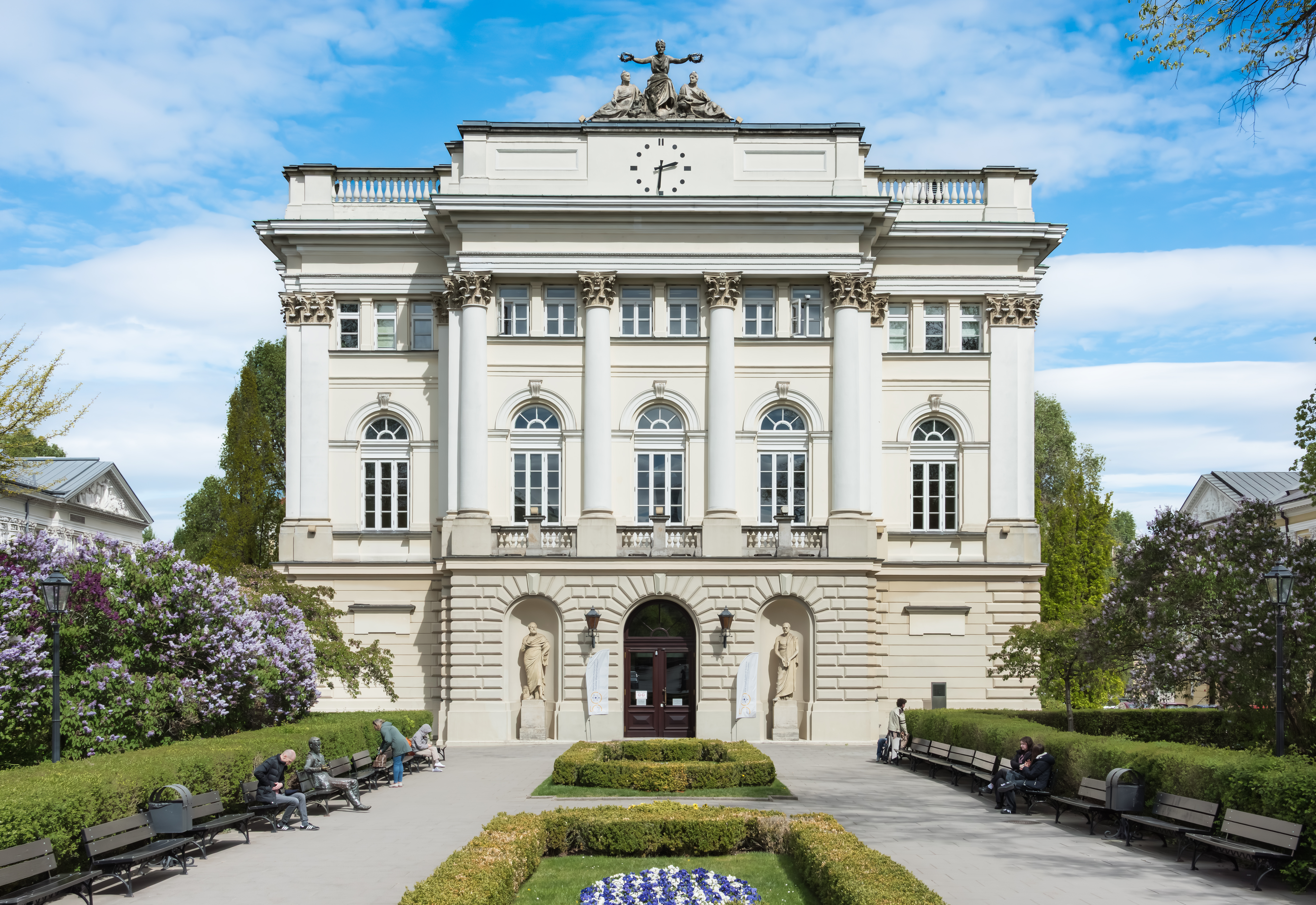
Old BUW location in the main university campus, Krakowskie Przedmieście

The library was founded in 1816 as a direct consequence of establishing The Royal Warsaw University. Samuel Linde, a linguist, lexicographer, educator and librarian, became its first director. The library initially housed mostly theological and historical Books, the collection was however enlarged by papers from other scientific fields thanks to the right to receive Legal deposits obtained in 1819. In 1831 the library, which served as a public library at that time, already housed 134,000 volumes of books, stored in Kazimierzowski Palace.

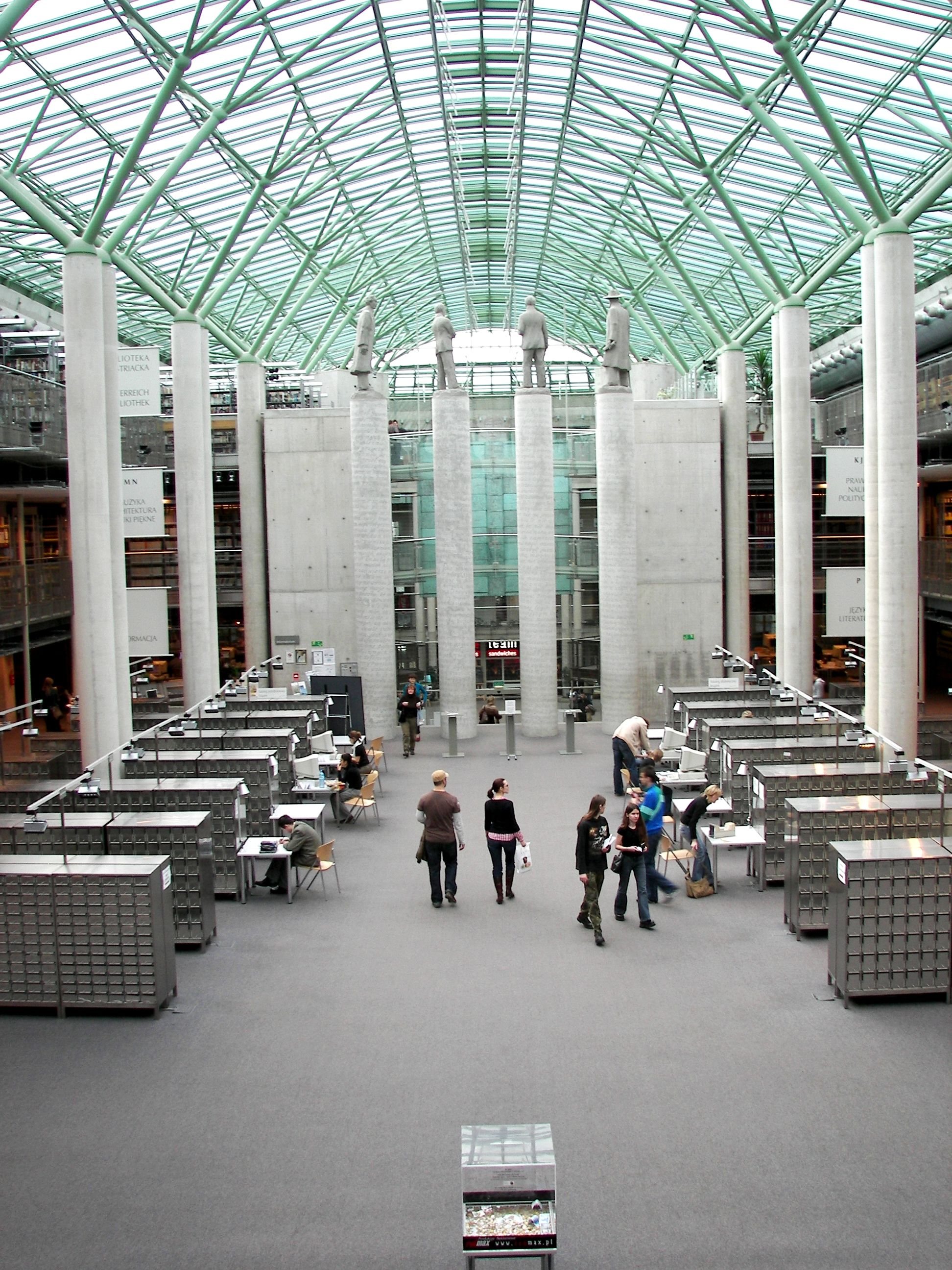
Interior of the Building, statues of philosophers of the Lvov-Warsaw School: Kazimierz Twardowski, Jan Łukasiewicz, Alfred Tarski and Stanisław Leśniewski.

After the fall of the November uprising the same year, the institution had been closed, and most of the collection taken away by Russian authorities to Saint Petersburg. In 1862, the university was reinstated in Warsaw under the name of Main School and so was the library, which was renamed as the Main Library. The collection numbered 260,000 book volumes.

In 1871, Main School became the Imperial University of Warsaw and the Main Library fell under the control of that University. The collection was growing constantly, and a much needed new building was constructed in 1891–1894 at Krakowskie Przedmieście. The building was designed to fit one million volumes. Before the outbreak of World War I the collection had grown to 610,000 volumes. During the war some of the most precious books and Manuscripts were taken away to Rostov-on-Don by fleeing tsarist authorities. After the 1921 Treaty of Riga, most of the works were returned to Poland. At the outbreak of World War II, the library held about one million items. During the war part of the most precious collections, 14% or 130 000 volumes, was damaged by fire. Thanks to the dedicated librarians some of the library's resources survived the war after being walled-in in the basement.

After the war the library focused mainly on recovering its collections and acquiring new ones from abandoned properties of Germans and Polish nobility. During the first five post-war years, the library's collection increased by 350 thousand volumes and remained the largest academic library in Poland. Unfortunately communist authorities’ deliberate reduction of funds for the university has automatically caused significant limitations in extending the library's resources. Until the end of 1990s the library's poor accommodation situation corresponded with the difficulties in collecting, organising and circulating its collections.

During the 1980s the library was one of the prominent centres of free thought and activism. The members of anti-communist resistance, including the famous Solidarność movement, were frequent guests to the library.

In the 1990s a selection procedure for a new building was initiated. A design by architects Marek Budzyński and Zbigniew Badowski was chosen, and the new library building was opened on 15 December 1999. Six months before, on 11 June 1999, the building was blessed by Pope John Paul II. On 15 June 2001 president of the United States, George W. Bush gave a speech in the new library building to the university community and the residents of Warsaw.

== Present Day ==
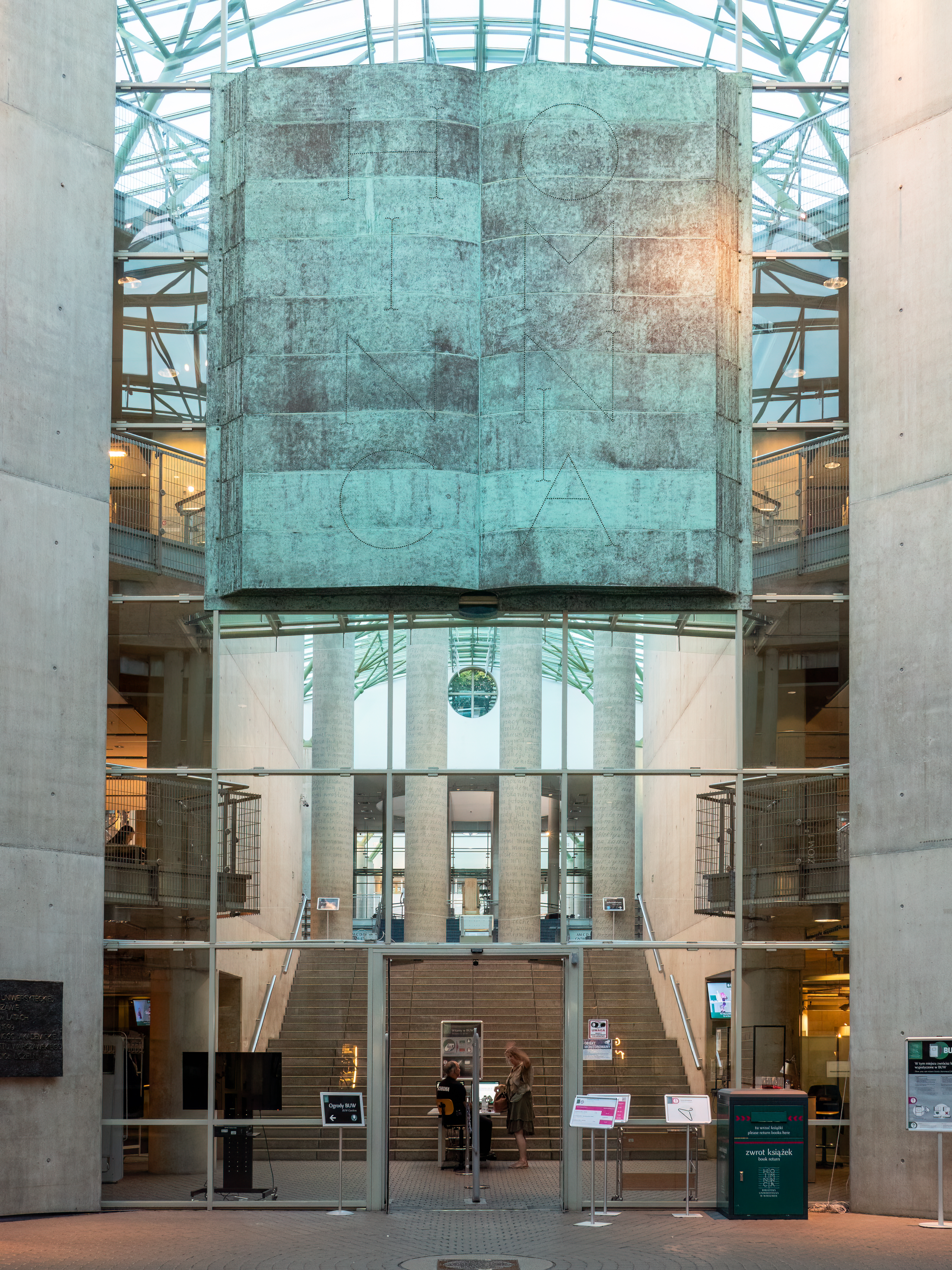
Entrance to the library. Above is a large book sculpture with the words hinc omnia

=== Collection ===
As of 2019, there were 6,236,619 items at the University of Warsaw Library and 40 faculty libraries of the University of Warsaw. The collection of the University Library itself consists of 3,393,209 items, including 2,200,073 non-serial publications, 782,064 periodicals and 407,511 items from special collections. The number of BUW readers in 2019 was 112,826.

The library has the right to receive legal deposits.

=== Crispa ===
Logo

In 2007 the University of Warsaw established its own electronic library. The resources available online mostly consist of public domain materials and publications for which the university was granted license by the right holders. Until 2019 the electronic library operated under a short name "e-bUW". In September 2019 a new version was launched and since then the library is officially called Crispa.

=== BuwLOG – the library's blog ===
In the years 1996–2013, over 200 issues of the "BUW Bulletin" - a periodical describing important moments in the life of the library were published. Until November 2010 the Bulletin was issued in paper and electronic form. Since December 2010 the Bulletin is issued only in electronic form. Since March 2014, librarians describe the library's reality, discuss and share their professional experience, and publish their own works at BuwLOG.

=== BUW for owls ===
BUW for owls (pol. BUW dla sów) was an event at the University of Warsaw Library. For the two weeks preceding and during examination the library stayed open for students until 5 in the morning. BUW for owls was introduced before the winter session in 2010. The library remained open until morning for two weeks, except on weekends. The event was enthusiastically received by the students and then started taking place regularly: twice a year before the winter and summer examination sessions. The idea became popular with attendance reaching hundereds of users a night.

In 2023 BUW for Owls was recognized by the IFLA PressReader International Marketing Award for the strategic, innovative and successful approach to library marketing.

From October 2023 the library was open around-the-clock all week long except some holidays. After consultations with the university community, the opening hours have been changed in October 2025: the library is open from 7 am to 1 am. BUW for owls in a 24-hour mode takes place before and during the exam sessions.

=== Self-service mode ===
In 2019, for the first time, the library was open without the librarians on site, in a so-called self-service mode. The change in the operating mode was a direct result of the evident demand of the university community for extended opening hours of the library during the summer months.

=== BiblioWawa – Warsaw Reciprocal Borrowing Programme ===
BUW participates in a joint project of 7 Warsaw academic libraries, which provides the Warsaw academic community with convenient access to circulating library resources of the cooperating libraries. Warsaw Reciprocal Borrowing Programme was launched on 18 December 2017. Apart from BUW, the project is co-created by the following libraries of Warsaw's universities: Maria Grzegorzewska University, Józef Piłsudski University of Physical Education in Warsaw, Warsaw University of Technology, Cardinal Stefan Wyszyński University in Warsaw, Medical University of Warsaw, Military University of Technology.

=== BUW among international associations and organizations ===
University of Warsaw Library is a member of the following associations and organizations:

- AANLA – Association des Amis des Nouvelles du Livre Ancien;
- CERL – Consortium of European Research Libraries;
- IAC – International Advisory Committee of Keepers of Public Collection of Graphic Art;
- IAML – International Association of Music Libraries;
- ICAM – International Confederation of Architectural Museums;
- IFLA – International Federation of Library Associations and Institutions;
- LIBER – Ligue des Bibliothèques Europeennes de Recherche;
- OCLC – Online Computer Library Center Global Council, EMEA Regional Council.

=== Theft of 19th-century records ===
In October 2023 librarians found several Russian-language 19th-century records missing, intentionally replaced with placeholders by unknown perpetrators. Due to the incident, the head librarian Anna Wołodko, as well as deputy director of special records Katarzyna Ślaska got expelled from their respective offices.

== University gardens and architecture ==
The distinct new building includes a botanical garden, located on the roof. The garden designed by landscape architect Irena Bajerska, has an area of one hectare, and is one of the largest roof gardens in Europe.

It is freely accessible not only to the academia, but also to the public.

The upper part of the garden consists of four parts: the Golden Garden (to the north), the Silver Garden (to the east), the Crimson Garden (to the south) and the Green Garden (to the west). It is available from April to October while from 1 November to 31 March only the Lower Garden is open.

The main facade on the Dobra Street side contains large blocks of classical texts in various scripts, including the Old Polish text of Jan Kochanowski, Classical Greek text by Plato and Hebrew script from the Book of Ezekiel.

In 2004, Kyoei Steel company donated a traditional tea pavilion, Chashitsu to the Department of Japanese and Korean Studies of the Faculty of Oriental Studies at the University of Warsaw. It was placed on level 2 of the University Library. The pavilion designed by Teruhito Iijima and its surroundings were built of natural materials (wood, bamboo, paper, clay, stone). Various events take place in the Chashitsu: university classes devoted to Japanese tea culture, presentations and open chanoyu workshops, for example during the Japanese Days at the University of Warsaw. The pavilion is the only original example of traditional Japanese architecture in Poland.

Gardens on the Library roof

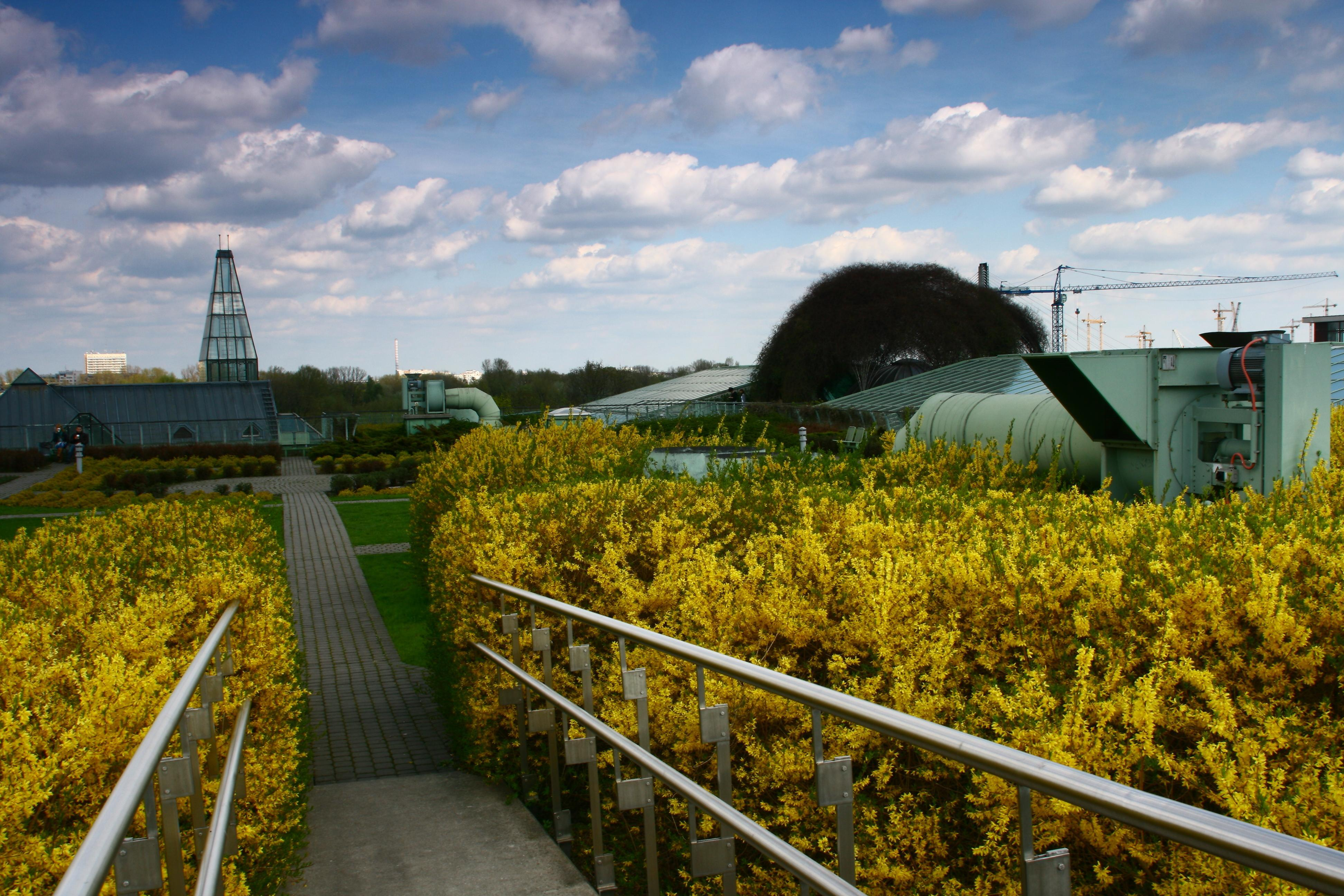
View from the upper garden (roof)

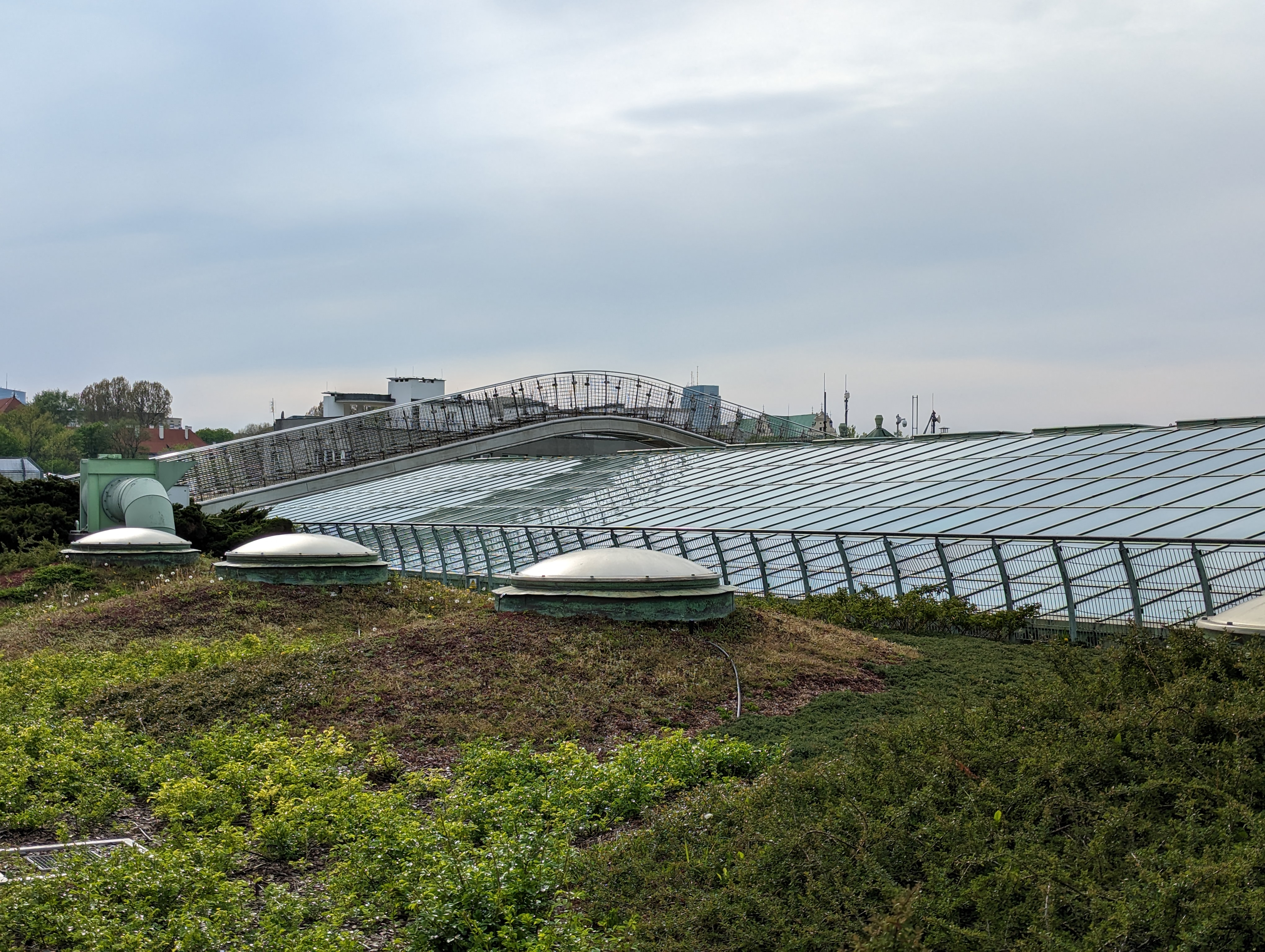
View from the upper garden (roof)

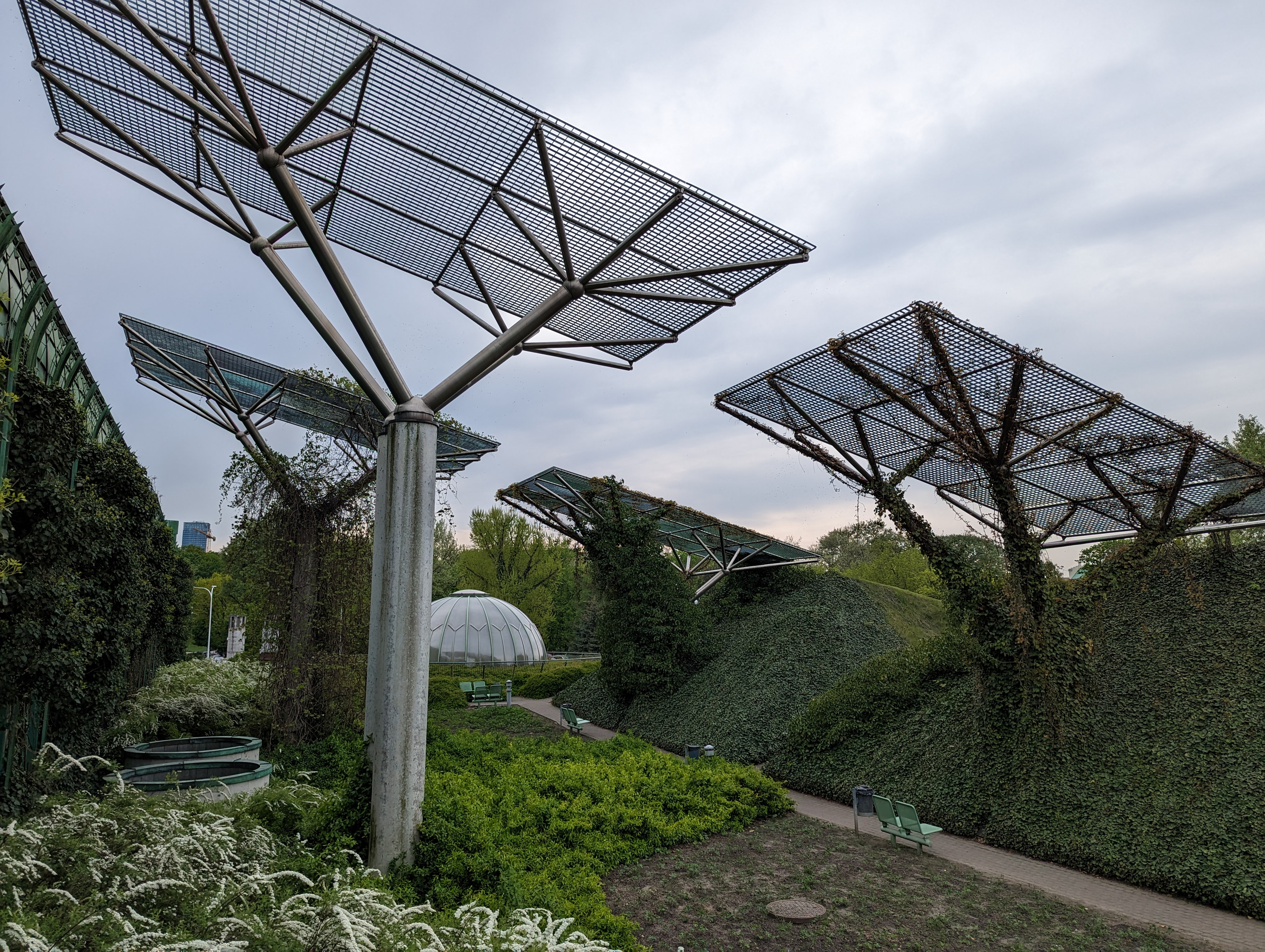
View from lower garden

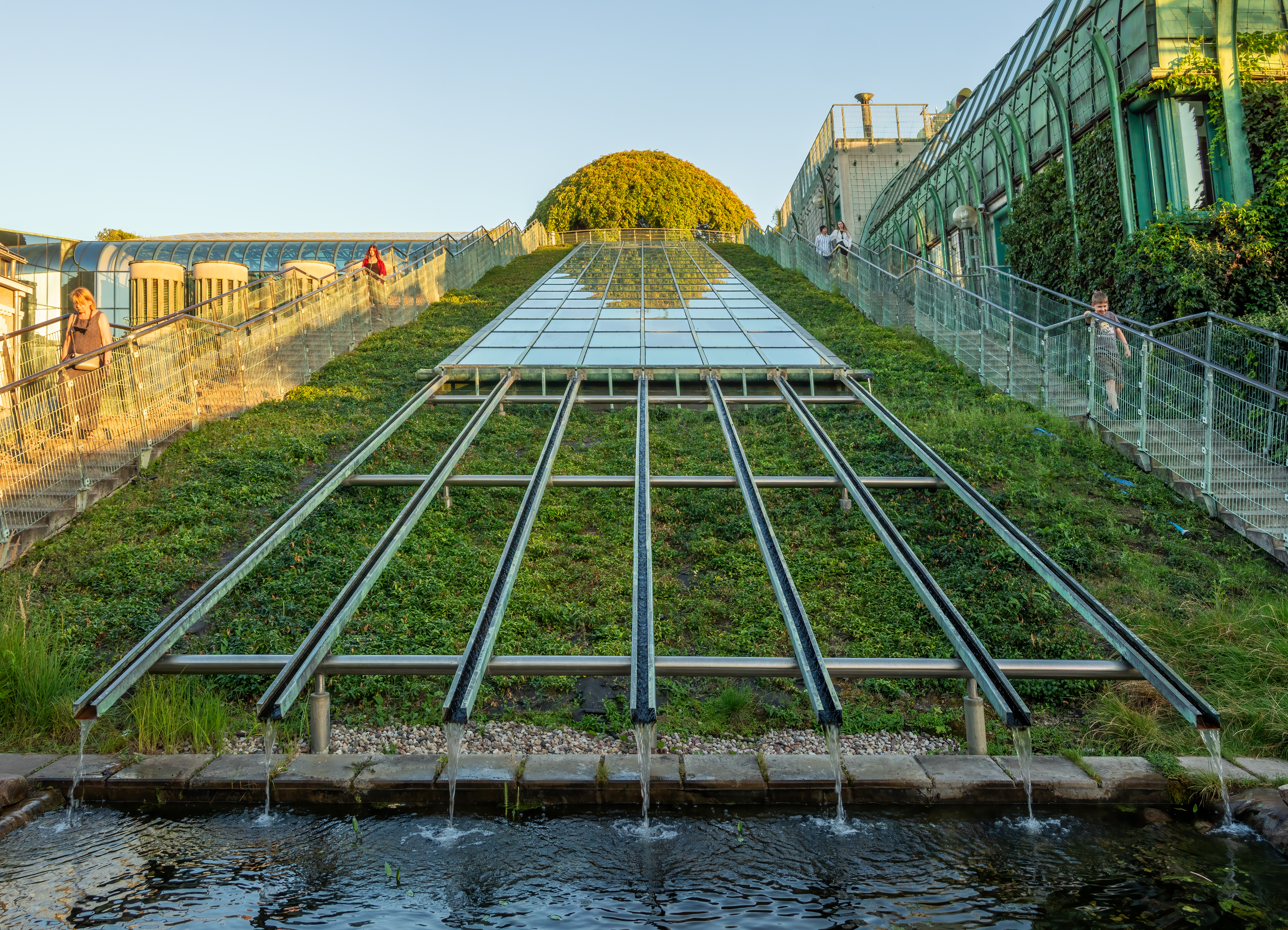
Waterway between upper and lower garden

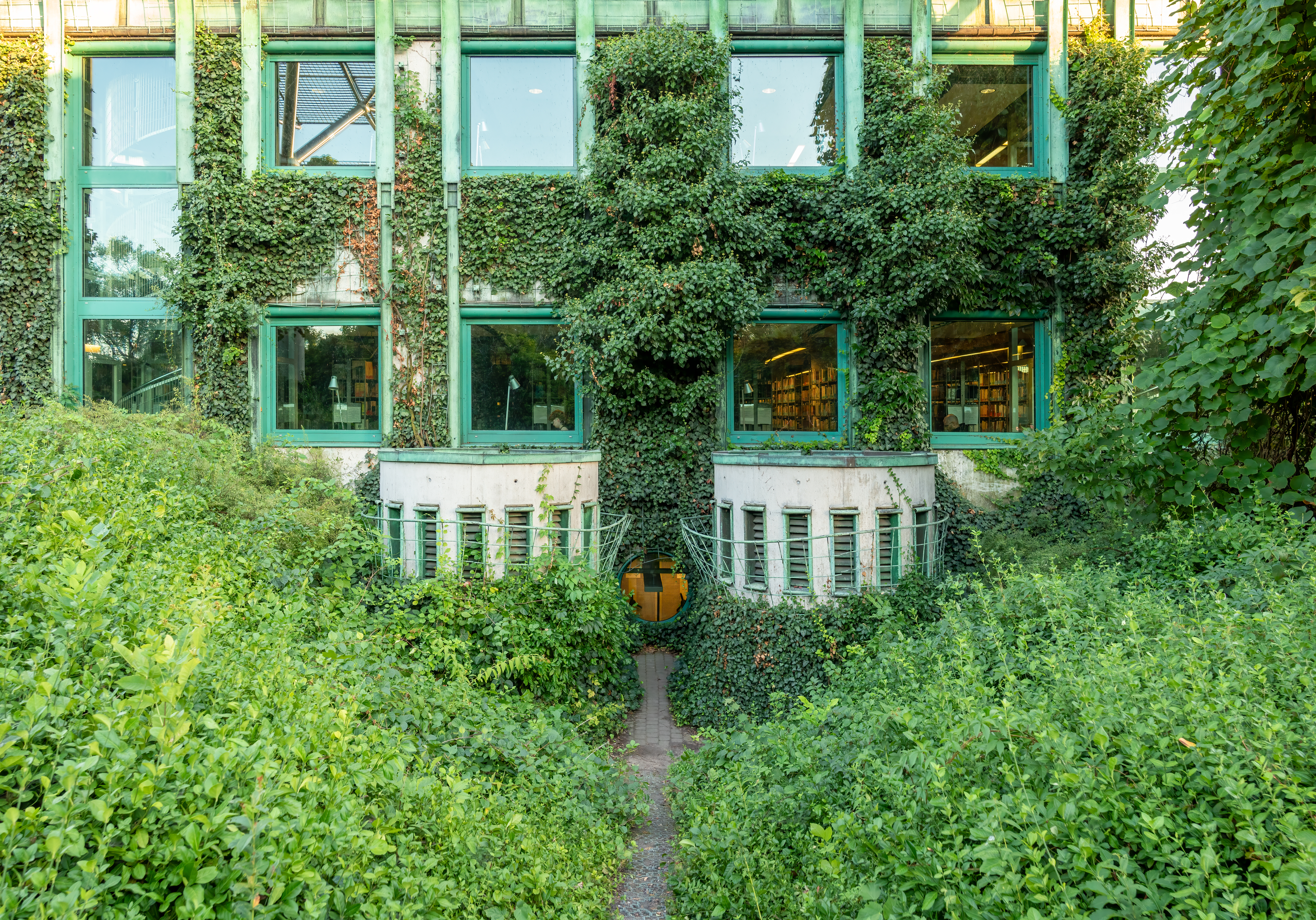
Vines cover the building exterior

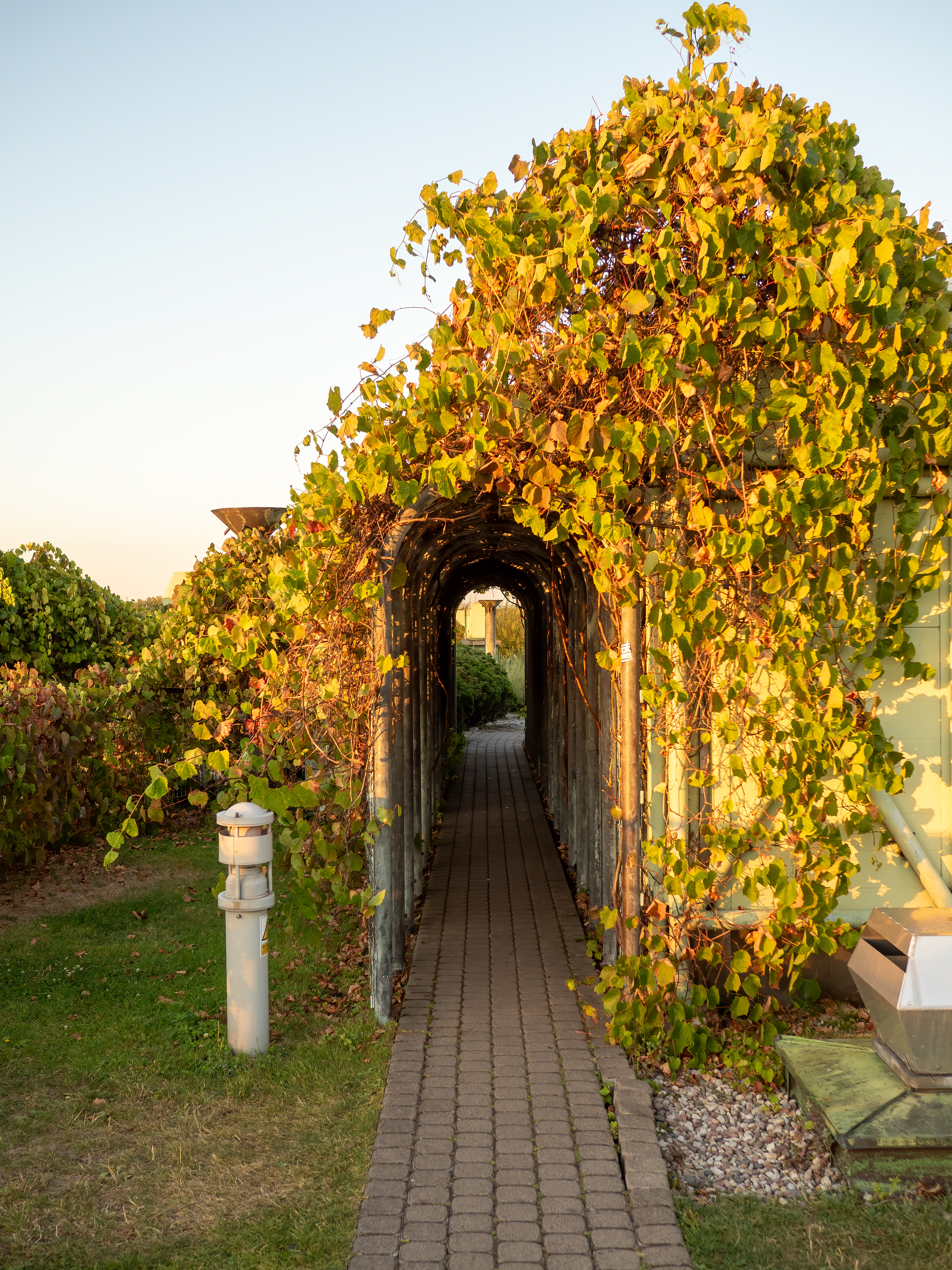
Trellis in the upper garden

== See also ==
- List of libraries in Poland
