= Tadeusz Czeżowski =

Polish philosopher and logician (1889–1981)

- Tadeusz Czeżowski (1936)
- Born: June 26, 1889; Vienna, Austria-Hungary
- Died: March 28, 1981 (aged 91); Toruń, Poland

Education
- Education: University of Lviv
- Thesis: Teoria klas

Philosophical work
- School: Lviv-Warsaw School
- Notable works: Logika

Tadeusz Czeżowski (July 26, 1889 – March 28, 1981) was a Polish philosopher and logician. He is considered one of the most prominent members of the Lviv-Warsaw School.

== Biography ==
Czeżowski was born in Vienna, Austria-Hungary on July 26, 1889. He was the son of a high-ranking state official a previous Prefect who later became the Counsellor of the Governorate of Galicia. In 1907, he studied philosophy, mathematics, and physics at the University of Lviv. His mother, Helena Kusche, was considered part of the petite bourgeoisie of the city. He became a student of Kazimierz Twardowski, who conferred to Czeżowski his doctorate in philosophy in 1914 after completing his dissertation entitled, Teoria klas (Theory of Classes). He also became a member of the Lwów–Warsaw School of Logic.

After qualifying as mathematics and physics teacher, he started teaching in a Lviv grammar school in 1912. From 1923 to 1939 he was a professor at Stefan Batory University in Vilnius, Lithuania, and from 1945 to 1960 a professor at Nicolaus Copernicus University in Toruń, Poland. In 1948 he became editor of the magazine Ruch Filozoficzny. He died in Toruń in 1981.

He was named a member of the Righteous Among the Nations in 1963.

== Works ==
- O metafizyce, jej kierunkach i zagadnieniach (On Metaphysics, its directions and problems) (1948)
- Logika (1949)
- Odczyty filozoficzne (1958 and 1969)
- Filozofia na rozdrożu (1966)
- Pisma z etyki i teorii wartości (1989)
- Knowledge, Science, and Values. A Program for Scientific Philosophy Edited by Leon Gumanski, Amsterdam, Rodopi, 2000
