= Władysław Witwicki =

Polish polymath

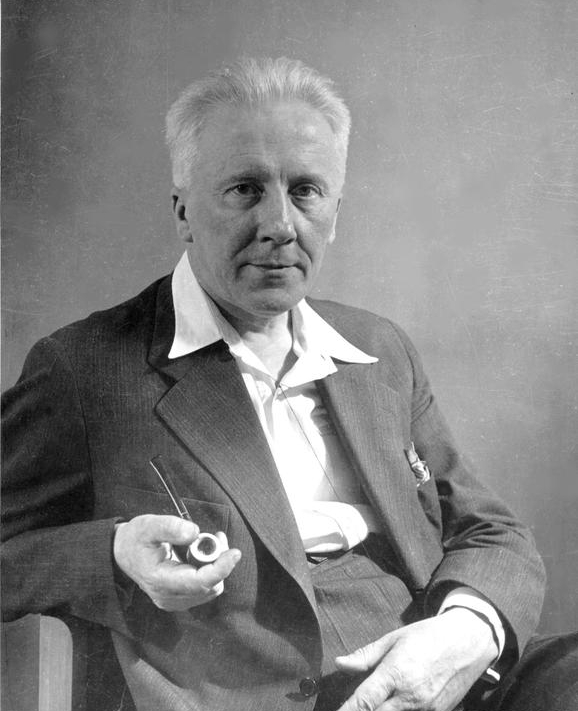
Władysław Witwicki (1945–1948)

Władysław Witwicki (Polish: [vitˈvit͡ski]; 30 April 1878, Lubaczów – 21 December 1948, Konstancin) was a Polish psychologist, philosopher, translator (mainly of Plato's works into Polish), historian (of philosophy and art) and artist. He is seen as one of the fathers of psychology in Poland.

Witwicki was also the creator of the theory of cratism, theory of feelings, and he dealt with the issues of the psychology of religion, and the creation of secular ethics. He was one of the initiators and co-founders of Polish Philosophical Society. He is one of the thinkers associated with the Lwów–Warsaw school.

== Background ==
Władysław Witwicki was the fifth child of Urszula Witwicka, born Woińska (niece of the Metropolitan Archbishop of the Roman Catholic Archdiocese of Lviv, Łukasz Baraniecki), and Ludwik–Filip Wasylkowicz Witwicki, as well as father of Janusz Witwicki, the creators of the Plastic Panorama of Old Lviv.

He graduated from the University of Lviv (1900), was a student of Kazimierz Twardowski. In 1901–1902 he studied at the University of Vienna (under the direction of Alois Höfler) and at the Leipzig University (under the direction of Wilhelm Wundt). Then Witwicki taught in Lviv gymnasiums (1902–1918), lectured at the University of Lviv (1907–1918), and became a professor at the University of Warsaw (1919–1948).

== Works ==
Witwicki is the author of the first Polish textbooks on psychology. He also collaborated with other philosophers. For instance, he worked with Bronisław Bandrowski to develop a model of psychology based on Franz Brentano's theory on phenomenology. It included an analysis of Edmund Husserl's Theory of Content and the Phenomenon of Thinking.

In the comments to his own translation of the Gospels of Matthew and Mark – Dobra Nowina według Mateusza i Marka (The Good News according to Matthew and Mark) – Witwicki challenges the mental health of Jesus. He attributed to Jesus subjectivism, increased sense of his own power and superiority over others, egocentrism and the tendency to subjugate other people, as well as difficulties communicating with the outside world and multiple personality disorder, which made him a schizothymic or even schizophrenic type (according to the Ernst Kretschmer's typology).

== Artistic activities ==
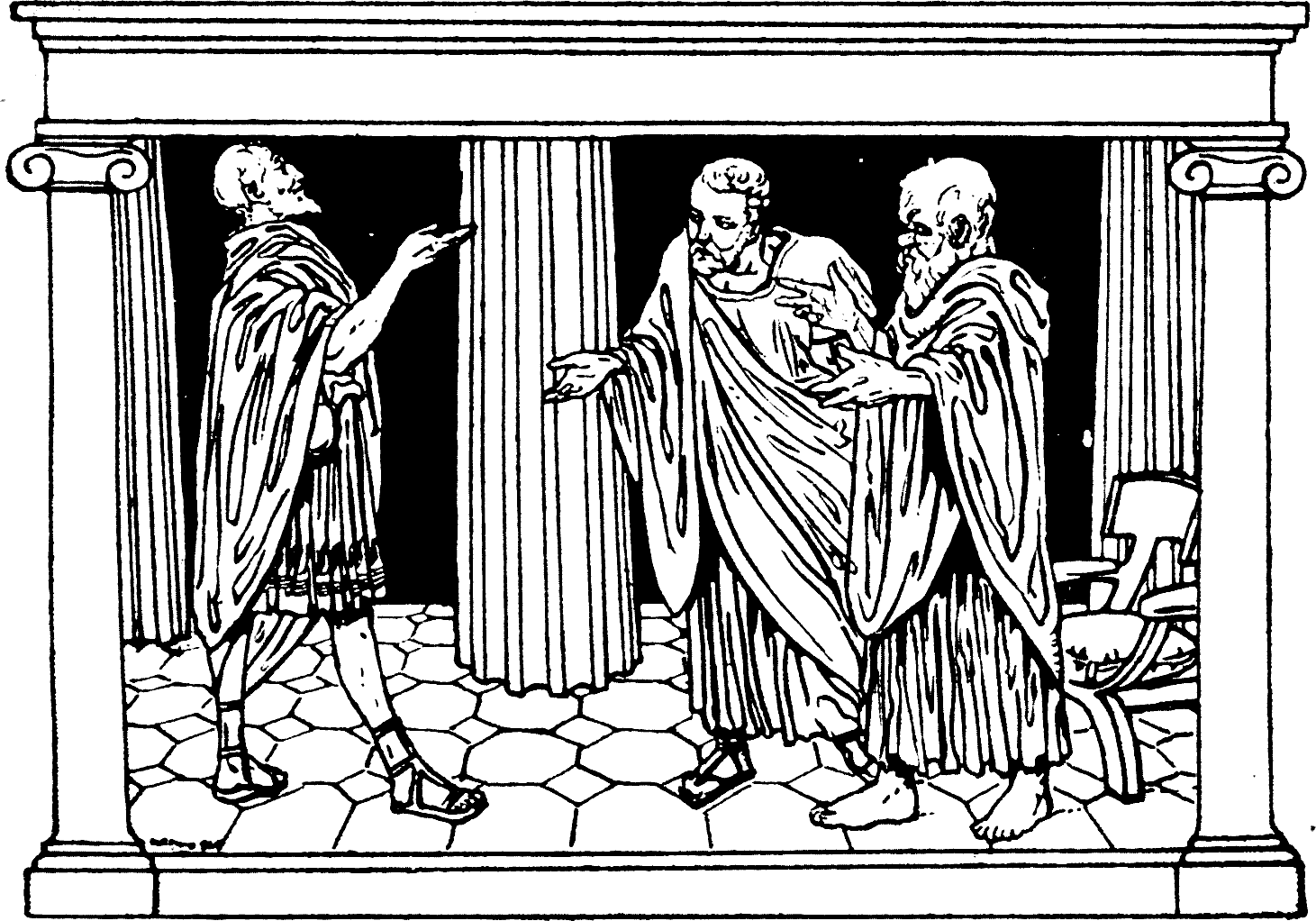
Illustration by Władysław Witwicki for his translation into Polish of Plato's Hippias Minor (1921)

Witwicki illustrated books (including his own translations), created watercolors, etchings, woodcuts, bookplates. He designed magazine covers, cast plaster busts, sculpted, reviewed exhibitions, presented artists' profiles. He helped his son Janusz create the Plastic Panorama of Old Lviv. He lectured and wrote articles about art, and authored textbooks for visual artists: Wiadomości o stylach (About Styles); O widzeniu przedmiotów: Zasady perspektywy (Seeing Objects: Principles of Perspective); Anatomia plastyczna (Plastic Anatomy).

== Selected publications ==
- Translations of Plato's dialogues
- Psychologia do użytku słuchaczów wyższych szkół naukowych, vol. 1–2 (1925–1927)
- Wiadomości o stylach (1934)
- Wiara oświeconych, 1959 (fr.: La foi des éclairés, 1939)
- Przechadzki ateńskie (a series of radio programs, 1939, issued in 1947)
- Translations of the Gospel of Matthew and the Gospel of Mark with psychological analysis: Dobra Nowina według Mateusza i Marka (The Good News according to Matthew and Mark); written in 1942, issued in 1958

== See also ==
- History of philosophy in Poland
- List of Poles
- List of psychologists

== Sources ==
- Chodakiewicz, Marek Jan; Radzilowski, John; Tolczyk, Dariusz, eds. (2009). Poland's Transformation: A Work in Progress. New Brunswick, London: Transaction Publishers. ISBN 978-1-4128-3096-6.
- Citlak, Amadeusz (2015). "Psychobiography of Jesus Christ in view of Władysław Witwicki's theory of cratism". Journal for Perspectives of Economic Political and Social Integration. 21 (1–2). Scientific Society KUL: 155–184. doi:10.2478/pepsi-2015-0007. ISSN 2300-0945. OCLC 998362074. S2CID 151801662.
- Nowicki, Andrzej (1982). Witwicki (in Polish). Warszawa: Wiedza Powszechna. ISBN 83-214-0301-8.
- Rzepa, Teresa (1991). Psychologia Władysława Witwickiego [Psychology of Władysław Witwicki] (in Polish). Poznań: Wydawnictwo Naukowe UAM. ISBN 83-232-0332-6.
- Rzepa, Teresa (1992). "Witwicki Władysław". In Kosnarewicz, Elwira; Rzepa, Teresa; Stachowski, Ryszard; et al. (eds.). Słownik psychologów polskich [Dictionary of Polish psychologists] (in Polish). Poznań: Instytut Psychologii UAM. pp. 214–218. OCLC 834052536.
- Płotka, Witold (2020). "From psychology to phenomenology (and back again): A controversy over the method in the school of Twardowski". Phenomenology and the Cognitive Sciences. 19 (1): 141–167. doi:10.1007/s11097-019-09620-x. ISSN 1572-8676.
- Witwicki, Władysław (1958). Dobra Nowina według Mateusza i Marka [The Good News according to Matthew and Mark] (in Polish). Warszawa: Państwowe Wydawnictwo Naukowe. OCLC 681830910.
- Szmyd, Jan (1996). Psychologiczny obraz religijności i mistyki: z badań psychologów polskich [Psychological picture of religiousness and mysticism: from the research of the Polish psychologists] (in Polish). Kraków: Wydawn. Naukowe WSP. ISBN 978-8-3868-4154-7.
