= Kazimierz Twardowski =

Polish philosopher (1866–1938)

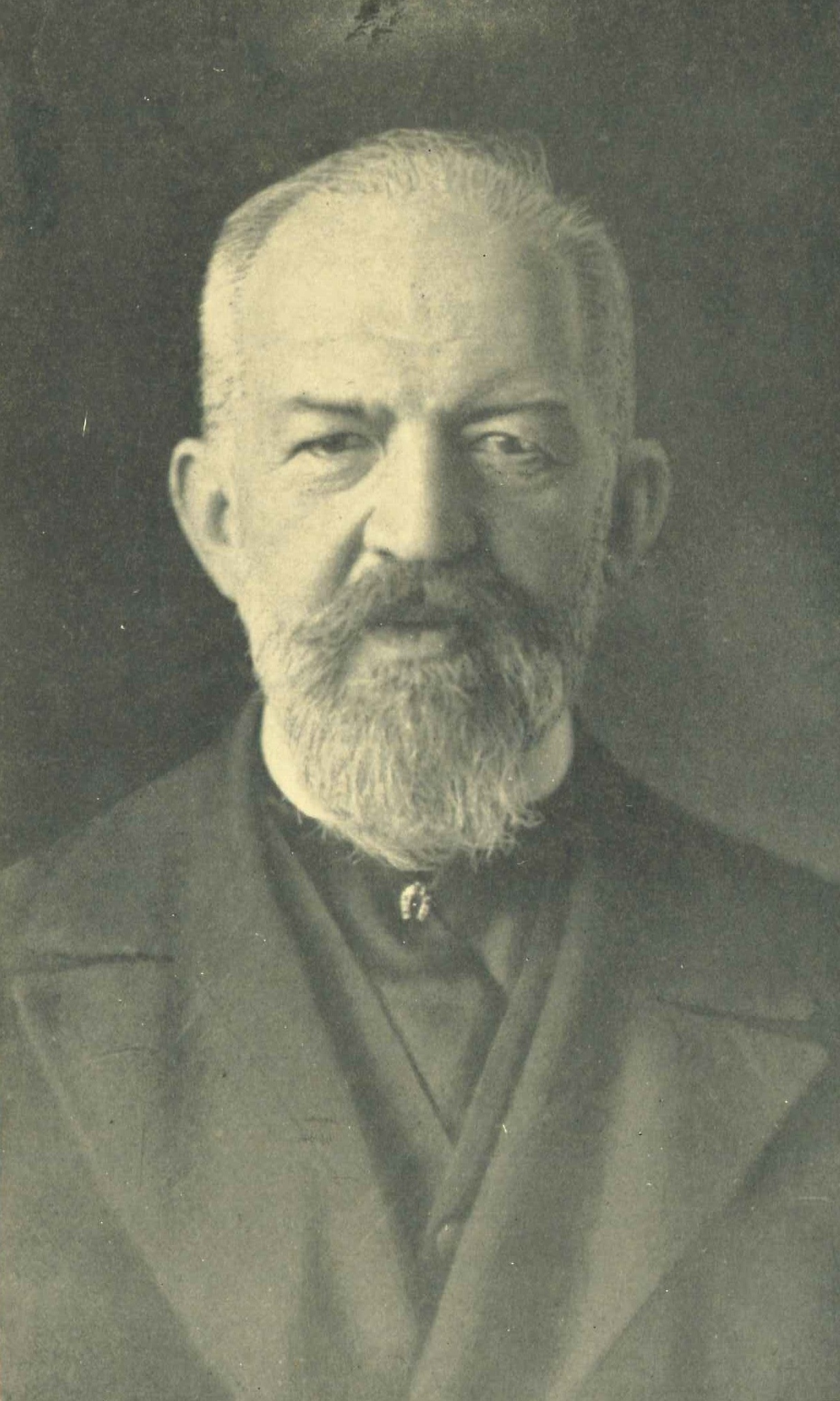
- Born: Kazimierz Jerzy Skrzypna-Twardowski; 20 October 1866; Vienna, Austrian Empire
- Died: 11 February 1938 (aged 71); Lwów, Poland (now Lviv, Ukraine)

Education
- Education: University of Vienna (Ph.D., 1891; Dr. phil. hab., 1894)
- Theses: Über den Unterschied zwischen der klaren und deutlichen Perception und der klaren und deutlichen Idee bei Descartes (On the difference between clear and distinct perception and between clear and distinct ideas in Descartes) (1891); Zur Lehre vom Inhalt und Gegenstand der Vorstellungen (On the Doctrine of the Content and Object of Presentations) (1894)
- Doctoral advisor: Robert von Zimmermann
- Other advisor: Franz Brentano

Philosophical work
- Era: 19th-century philosophy 20th-century philosophy
- Region: Western philosophy: Polish philosophy
- School: Lwów–Warsaw school School of Brentano
- Institutions: University of Vienna (1894–1895); Lwów University (1895–1930); Polish Philosophical Society (1904–1938, founder)
- Doctoral students: Kazimierz Ajdukiewicz; Stefan Banach; Tadeusz Kotarbiński; Stanisław Leśniewski; Jan Łukasiewicz; Bronislaw Bandrowski; Władysław Witwicki
- Main interests: Empirical psychology; Logic; Pedagogy
- Notable ideas: Content–object distinction Lwów–Warsaw school

Kazimierz Jerzy Skrzypna-Twardowski (Polish: [tfarˈdɔfskʲi]; 20 October 1866 – 11 February 1938) was a Polish philosopher, psychologist, logician, and rector of the Lwów University.

He was initially affiliated with Alexius Meinong's Graz school of object theory. Twardowski emphasized "small philosophy" or the detailed, systematic analysis of specific problems.

== Academic career ==
Twardowski's family belonged to the Ogończyk coat of arms.

Twardowski studied philosophy at the University of Vienna with Franz Brentano and Robert von Zimmermann. In 1891 he received his doctorate with his dissertation, Idee und Perzeption (Idea and Perception).

In 1894 Twardowski published a book, entitled Zur Lehre vom Inhalt und Gegenstand der Vorstellungen, Eine psychologische Untersuchung (On the Doctrine of the Content and Object of Presentations). The book was written between 1891 and 1893, although excerpts of the book were republished under the title On the Content and Object of Representations, which is an early text on semiotics.

Twardowski originated many novel ideas related to metaphilosophy.

He lectured at the University of Vienna in the years 1894 and 1895.

In 1895 was appointed professor at Lwów (Lemberg in Austrian Galicia, now Lviv in Ukraine). An outstanding lecturer, he was also a rector of the Lwów University during World War I. There Twardowski soon established the Lwów–Warsaw school of logic and became the "father of Polish logic". Among his students were the logicians Stanisław Leśniewski, Jan Łukasiewicz and Tadeusz Czeżowski, the psychologist Władysław Witwicki, the historian of philosophy Władysław Tatarkiewicz, the phenomenologist and aesthetician Roman Ingarden, as well as philosophers close to the Vienna Circle such as Tadeusz Kotarbiński and Kazimierz Ajdukiewicz.

Twardowski also established the Polish Philosophical Society in 1904, the first laboratory of experimental psychology in Poland in 1907, and the journal Ruch Filozoficzny in 1911.

He officially retired in 1930.

== Work ==
In his 1894 book On the Content and Object of Presentations (also known as On the Doctrine of the Content and Object of Presentations), Twardowski argues for a distinction between content and object in the frame of the theory of intentionality of his teacher Franz Brentano. According to him the mind is divided in two main areas: acts or mental phenomena, and a physical phenomenon. For example, an act of mental representation is aimed at a presentation. This is what he called ‘intentionality’, aboutness. Every act is about something, but also every presentation goes together with an act of presentation.

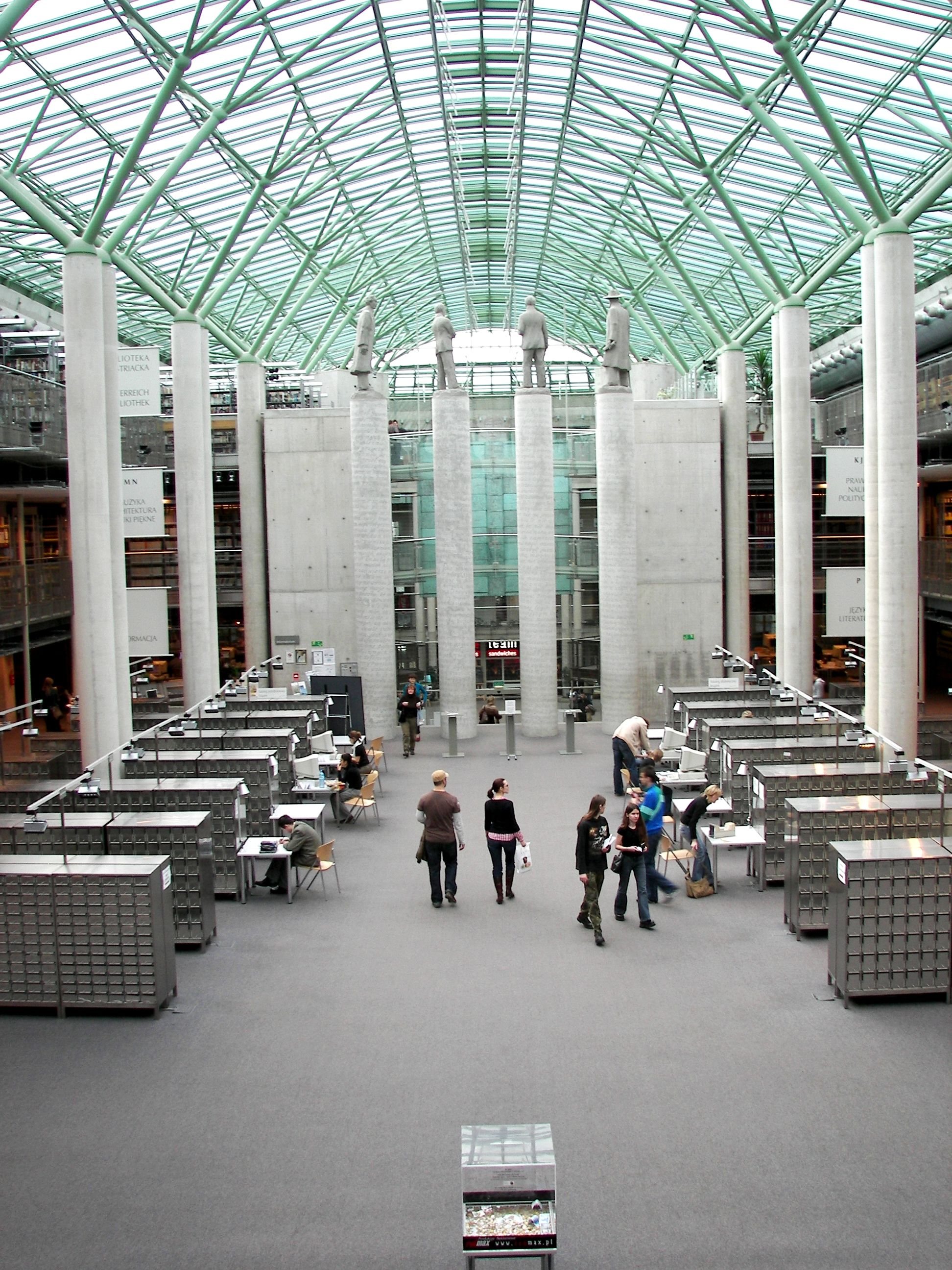
Warsaw University Library – at the entrance are pillared statues of Lviv-Warsaw School of Logic philosophers (right to left) Kazimierz Twardowski, Jan Łukasiewicz, Alfred Tarski, and Stanisław Leśniewski

This theory suffers from the problem that it is not clear what the presentation exactly is. Is the presentation something only in the mind, or is it also in the world as object? Twardowski says that sometimes presentation is used for the object in the world and sometimes for the immanent content of a mental phenomenon.

Twardowski offers a solution for this problem and proposes to make a distinction between the content of a presentation and the object of a presentation.

In his book Twardowski offers an analogy to clarify this distinction. He uses the example of a painting. People say of a landscape that it is painted, but also of a painting that it is painted. In the first case the word ‘painting’ is used in a modifying way (a painted landscape is not a landscape at all), while in the latter case the word painting is used in a qualitative or attributive way. Twardowski argues that presentations are similar. The content is the painted painting and the object is the painted landscape. The content resembles the present ‘picture’ in one's mind, and the object the landscape.

== Bibliography ==
=== Works in German and Polish ===
- Über den Unterschied zwischen der klaren und deutlichen Perception und der klaren und deutlichen Idee bei Descartes (On the difference between clear and distinct perception and between clear and distinct ideas in Descartes, doctoral dissertation, 1891)
- Idee und perzeption. Eine erkenntnis-theoretische Untersuchung aus Descartes (1892)
- Zur Lehre vom Inhalt und Gegenstand der Vorstellungen (On the Doctrine of the Content and Object of Presentations, habilitation thesis, 1894)
- Wyobrażenia i pojęcia (1898)
- O tzw. prawdach względnych (1900)
- Über sogenannte relative Wahrheiten (1902)
- Über begriffliche Vorstellungen (1903)
- Das Wesen der Begriffe allegato a Jahresbericht der Wiener philosophischen Gesellschaft (1903)
- O psychologii, jej przedmiocie, zadaniach, metodzie, stosunku do innych nauk i jej rozwoju (1913)
- Rozprawy i artykuły filozoficzne (1927)
- Wybrane pisma filozoficzne (1965) (Collection of the philosophical essays)
- Wybór pism psychologicznych i pedagogicznych (1992) (Collection of the psychological and pedagogical essays)
- Dzienniki (1997)

=== Translations ===
- On the Content and Object of Presentations. A Psychological Investigation. The Hague: Martinus Nijhoff 1977. Translated and with an introduction by Reinhardt Grossmann.
- On Actions, Products and Other Topics in Philosophy. Edited by Johannes Brandl and Jan Wolenski. Amsterdam: Rodopi 1999. Translated and annotated by Arthur Szylewicz.
- On Prejudices, Judgments and Other Topics in Philosophy. Edited by Anna Brożek e Jacek Jadacki. Amsterdam: Rodopi 2014.
- Sur les objets intentionnels (1893–1901). Paris: Vrin 1993. French translation of Zur Lehre vom Inhalt und Gegenstand der Vorstellungen and other texts by Edmund Husserl.

== See also ==
- Representationalism
- Polish logic
- History of philosophy in Poland
- List of Poles

== Sources ==
- Simons, Peter M. (2013). Philosophy and Logic in Central Europe from Bolzano to Tarski: Selected Essays. Springer.
- Rzepa, Teresa (1992). "Twardowski Kazimierz Jerzy Adolf ze Skrzypny Ogończyk". In Kosnarewicz, Elwira; Rzepa, Teresa; Stachowski, Ryszard; et al. (eds.). Słownik psychologów polskich [Dictionary of Polish psychologists] (in Polish). Poznań: Instytut Psychologii UAM. pp. 198–202. OCLC 834052536.
