= Kazimierz Ajdukiewicz =

Polish philosopher and logician (1890-1963)

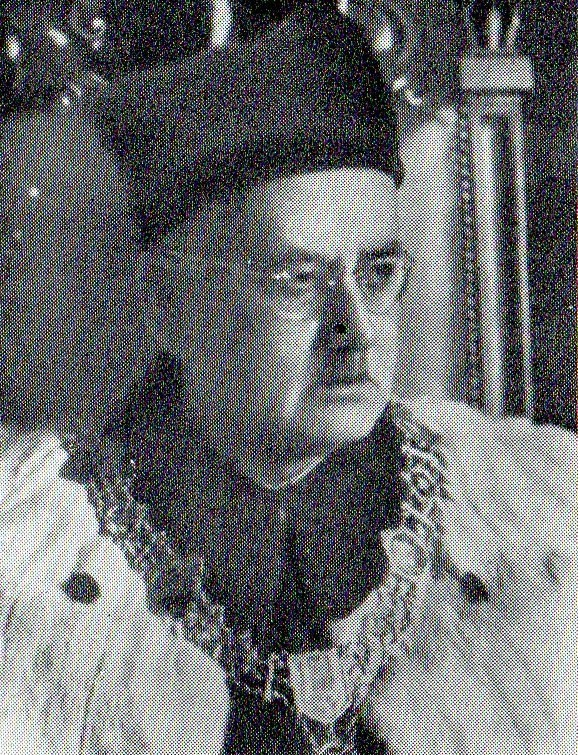
- Born: 12 December 1890; Tarnopol, Austrian Galicia, Austria-Hungary (now Ternopil, Ukraine)
- Died: 12 April 1963 (aged 72); Warsaw, Poland

Education
- Education: University of Lwów
- Thesis: On the Relation Between Kant’s Apriorism of Space and the Question of the Origin of the Representation of Space (1912)
- Doctoral advisor: Kazimierz Twardowski

Philosophical work
- Era: 20th-century philosophy
- Region: Western philosophy
- School: Lwów–Warsaw school of logic
- Institutions: University of Lwów; Adam Mickiewicz University; Warsaw University
- Notable students: Mojżesz Presburger
- Main interests: Logic, semantics, philosophy of science, model theory, methodology of science, semiotics
- Notable ideas: Categorial grammar Radical conventionalism

Kazimierz Ajdukiewicz (Polish: [kaˈʑimjɛʂ ajduˈkʲɛvʲit͡ʂ]; 12 December 1890 – 12 April 1963) was a Polish philosopher and logician, a prominent figure in the Lwów–Warsaw school of logic. He taught at the University of Lwów, Adam Mickiewicz University, and the University of Warsaw.

He originated many novel ideas in semantics. Among these was categorial grammar, a highly flexible framework for the analysis of natural language syntax and, indirectly, semantics that remains a major influence on work in formal linguistics. Ajdukiewicz's fields of research centered on model theory and the philosophy of science.

== Life and career ==
Ajdukiewicz was born on 12 December in 1890 in Tarnopol (now Ternopil in Ukraine), then part of the Kingdom of Galicia and Lodomeria, within Austria-Hungary. His father, Bronisław, was a senior civil servant, his mother, Magdalena, hailed from Vienna. He started his education in Kraków but his family soon relocated to Lwów. In 1908, Ajdukiewicz graduated from the C.K. Franciszek Józef Gymnasium in Lwów.

In the same year, Ajdukiewicz matriculated at the Jan Kazimierz University (now the University of Lviv) to study philosophy, physics and mathematics. His teachers included Kazimierz Twardowski, Wacław Sierpiński, Marian Smoluchowski, Jan Łukasiewicz and Władysław Witwicki. In that time, an intellectual cirlce formed around Twardowski, later known as the Lwów–Warsaw school of logic, and it was within this environment that Ajdukiewicz matured intellectually.

In 1912, he earned his doctorate under Twardowski based on his thesis on Immanuel Kant's philosophy of space entitled O stosunku aprioryzmu przestrzeni u Kanta do kwestii genezy wyobrażenia przestrzeni (On the Relation Between Kant’s Apriorism of Space and the Question of the Origin of the Representation of Space). In 1913–1914, Ajdukiewicz continued his education at the University of Göttingen where he attended lectures in philosophy by Edmund Husserl and Leonard Nelson, and in mathematics and logic by David Hilbert.

After the outbreak of World War I, Ajdukiewciz fought in the Austro-Hungarian Army on the Italian front. In 1918, when Poland regained its independence, he enlisted in the Polish Army and took part in the Polish-Soviet War (1919–1921) as an artillery officer. In 1920, he left the army to pursue his scientific career. In 1921, he obtained his habilitation at the University of Warsaw and from 1928 until 1939, he taught at his alma mater, the Jan Kazimierz University. In 1923, he participated in the First Congress of Polish Philosophy held in Lwów. In 1934, Ajdukiewicz obtained the title of professor. In 1938–1939, he served as the Chairman of the Polish Philosophical Society (Polish: Polskie Towarzystwo Filozoficzne).

Under German occupation during World War II, Ajdukiewicz avoided falling victim to the Massacre of Lwów professors, and until the end of the war, he worked as an accountant simultaneously conducting clandestine teaching for Polish youth. In 1945, he assumed the Chair of the Theory and Methodology of Science (later renamed the Chair of Logic) at the Adam Mickiewicz University in Poznań. Between 1948 and 1952, he served as the rector of that university. As a scientific official, Ajdukiewicz objected to the restriction of self-governance of universities and the centralization of the management of Polish science.

In 1954, Ajdukiewicz moved to Warsaw where he taught logic at the University of Warsaw. In 1957–1961, he assumed the Chair of Logic in the Department of Philosophy of the University of Warsaw. He also co-organized the Department of Logic at the Institute of Philosophy and Sociology of the Polish Academy of Sciences. He was one of the founders of the journal Studia Logica in its current form, editing it from 1953 until his death.

Ajdukiewicz published around 200 scientific papers, including 17 books, and supervised 8 doctoral students. In 1962, he received an honorary doctorate from the University of Clermont-Ferrand. He died suddenly of a heart-related condition on 12 April in 1963 and was buried in Warsaw at the Powązki Cemetery.

== Work ==
In his early epistemological system, which he called Radical Conventionalism, Ajdukiewicz analyzed any language as a set of expressions or sentences, with inferential rules of meaning that specify the relation of one expression to another, or to external data. There are three kinds of rules: Axiomatic, Deductive, and Empirical. Following the rules, one can map all knowable sentences of a language. However, some languages' vocabularies can produce disconnected sentences, which are only partly mapped by the meaning rules. Therefore, when one uses a language, even scientific one, a conceptual apparatus, an untranslatable set of meanings, is needed too, and with it a choice of the problems to be settled. For this reason the theory is a form of conventionalism, and it is radical because even simple experiential reports are exposed to these language-wide considerations. Ajdukiewicz discarded this theory as the 1930s progressed.

Perhaps the most important contribution of Ajdukiewicz was the introduction of categorial grammar, which he developed in the 1930s. It comprises a group of syntactic formalisms for natural languages that rest on the core idea that syntactic units combine through function–argument relations. Ajdukiewicz’s formal treatment of syntax drew on Edmund Husserl’s concept of pure logical grammar, later given a formal structure by Rudolph Carnap. It reflects an evolution of the longstanding notion that a universal logical grammar underlies all languages, and its central idea is that syntactic categories can be interchanged — which gives categorial grammar its name.

Ajdukiewicz, alongside Tadeusz Kotarbiński, is also considered one of the leading scholars in semiotics and the methodology of science, as well as in the application of logic to philosophical inquiry.

== Honours ==
- Medal of the 10th Anniversary of People's Poland (1955)
- Commander's Cross of the Order of Polonia Restituta (1954)
- Officer's Cross of the Order of Polonia Restituta (1951)
- Karl Troop Cross

== Bibliography ==
- 1921 "Z metodologii nauk dedukcyjnych"
- 1923 "Główne kierunki filozofii"
- 1928 "Główne zasady metodologii nauk i logiki formalnej"
- 1931 "O znaczeniu wyrażeń"
- 1934 "Logiczne podstawy nauczania"
- 1938 "Propedeutyka filozofii"
- 1948 "Epistemologia i semantyka"
- 1949 "Zagadnienia i kierunki filozofii"
- 1952 "Zarys logiki"
- 1964 "Zagadnienia empiryzmu a koncepcja znaczenia"
- 1965 "Logika pragmatyczna"
- 1960–1965 "Język i poznanie. Wybór pism"
- 1966- Selected articles in "Logiczna Teoria Nauki" ( Logical Theory of Science) Ed. T.Pawłowski, Printed PWN, Warszawa.
- Kazimierz Ajdukiewicz: Pragmatic Logic, Dordrecht, Reidel, 1974
- Kazimierz Ajdukiewicz: Problems and Theories of Philosophy, Cambridge, Cambridge University Press, 1975
- Kazimierz Ajdukiewicz: The Scientific World-Perspective and Other essays 1931–1963, Dordrecht, Reidel, 1977

== See also ==
- History of philosophy in Poland
- List of Poles
