= Stanisław Leśniewski =

Polish mathematician and philosopher (1886–1939)

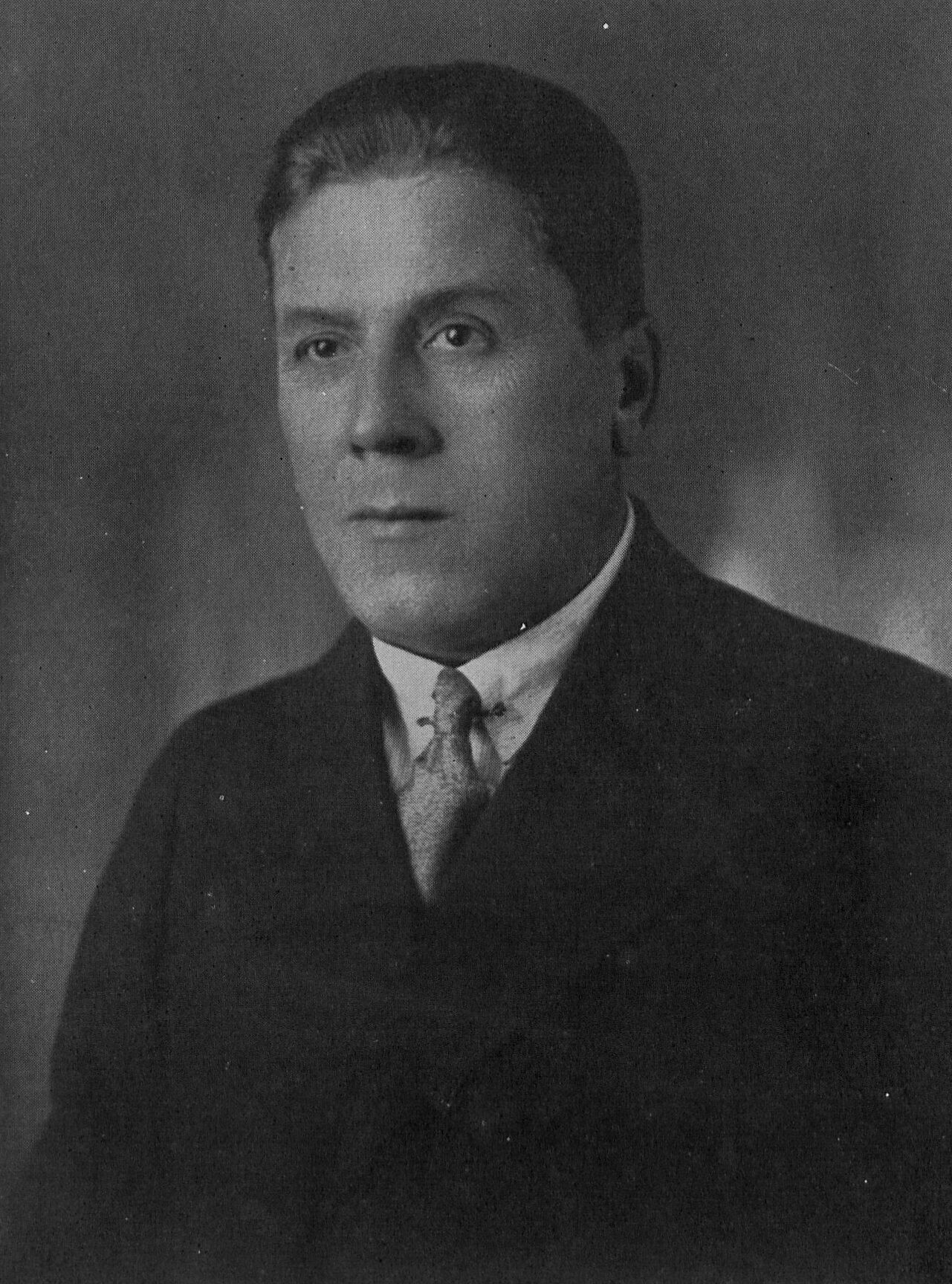
- Born: 30 March 1886; Serpukhov, Russian Empire
- Died: 13 May 1939 (aged 53); Warsaw, Poland
- Education: Lviv University
- Known for: Calculus of names Mereology
- Scientific career
- Fields: Mathematics
- Workplaces: University of Warsaw
- Doctoral advisor: Kazimierz Twardowski
- Doctoral students: Alfred Tarski

Stanisław Leśniewski (Polish: [lɛɕˈɲɛfskʲi]; 30 March 1886 – 13 May 1939) was a Polish mathematician, philosopher and logician. A professor of mathematics at the University of Warsaw, he was a leading representative of the Lwów–Warsaw School of Logic and is known for coining and introducing the concept of mereology as part of a comprehensive framework for logic and mathematics.

== Life ==
Leśniewski was born on 28 March 1886 at Serpukhov, near Moscow, to father Izydor, an engineer working on the construction of the Trans-Siberian Railway, and mother Helena (née Palczewska). Leśniewski went to a high school in Irkutsk. Later he attended lectures by Hans Cornelius at the Ludwig-Maximilians-Universität München and lectures by Wacław Sierpiński at Lviv University.

Leśniewski belonged to the first generation of the Lwów–Warsaw School of logic founded by Kazimierz Twardowski. Together with Alfred Tarski and Jan Łukasiewicz, he formed a trio which made the University of Warsaw, during the interbellum, perhaps the most important research center in the world for formal logic.

His main contribution was the construction of three nested formal systems, to which he gave the Greek-derived names of protothetic, ontology ("Calculus of names" is sometimes used instead of ontology, a term widely employed in metaphysics in a very different sense), and mereology, which, in its first, 1916, version introduced "the notion of collective class, a concrete notion of class elaborated by Leśniewski directly against Cantor’s sets, Frege’s extensions of concepts and Russell’s and Whitehead’s classes as incomplete symbols."

A good textbook presentation of these systems is that by Simons (1987), who compares and contrasts them with the variants of mereology, more popular nowadays, descending from the calculus of individuals of Leonard and Goodman. Simons clarifies something that is very difficult to determine by reading Leśniewski and his students, namely that Polish mereology is a first-order theory equivalent to what is now called classical extensional mereology (modulo choice of language).

While he did publish a fair body of work (Leśniewski, 1992, is his collected works in English translation), some of it in German, the leading language for mathematics of his day, his writings had limited impact because of their enigmatic style and highly idiosyncratic notation. Leśniewski was also a radical nominalist: he rejected axiomatic set theory at a time when that theory was in full flower. He pointed to Russell's paradox and the like in support of his rejection, and devised his three formal systems as a concrete alternative to set theory. Even though Alfred Tarski was his sole doctoral pupil, Leśniewski nevertheless strongly influenced an entire generation of Polish logicians and mathematicians via his teaching at the University of Warsaw. It is mainly thanks to the writings of his students (e.g., Srzednicki and Rickey 1984) that Leśniewski's thought is known.

During the Polish–Soviet War of 1919-21, Leśniewski served the cause of Poland's independence by breaking Soviet Russian ciphers for the Polish General Staff's Cipher Bureau.

Leśniewski died suddenly of cancer, shortly before the German invasion of Poland, which resulted in the destruction of his Nachlass. He was buried at Warsaw's Powązki Cemetery.

== Works ==
- — (1988). Lecture Notes in Logic. Dordrecht: Kluwer.
- — (1992). Collected Works. Dordrecht: Kluwer. "2 volumes"
- — (1929). "Über Funktionen, deren Felder Gruppen mit Rücksicht auf diese Funktionen sind". Fundamenta Mathematicae (in German). 13: 319–332.
- — (1929). "Grundzüge eines neuen Systems der Grundlagen der Mathematik". Fundamenta Mathematicae (in German). 14: 1–81.
- — (1929). "Über Funktionen, deren Felder Abelsche Gruppen in bezug auf diese Funktionen sind". Fundamenta Mathematicae (in German). 14: 242–251.

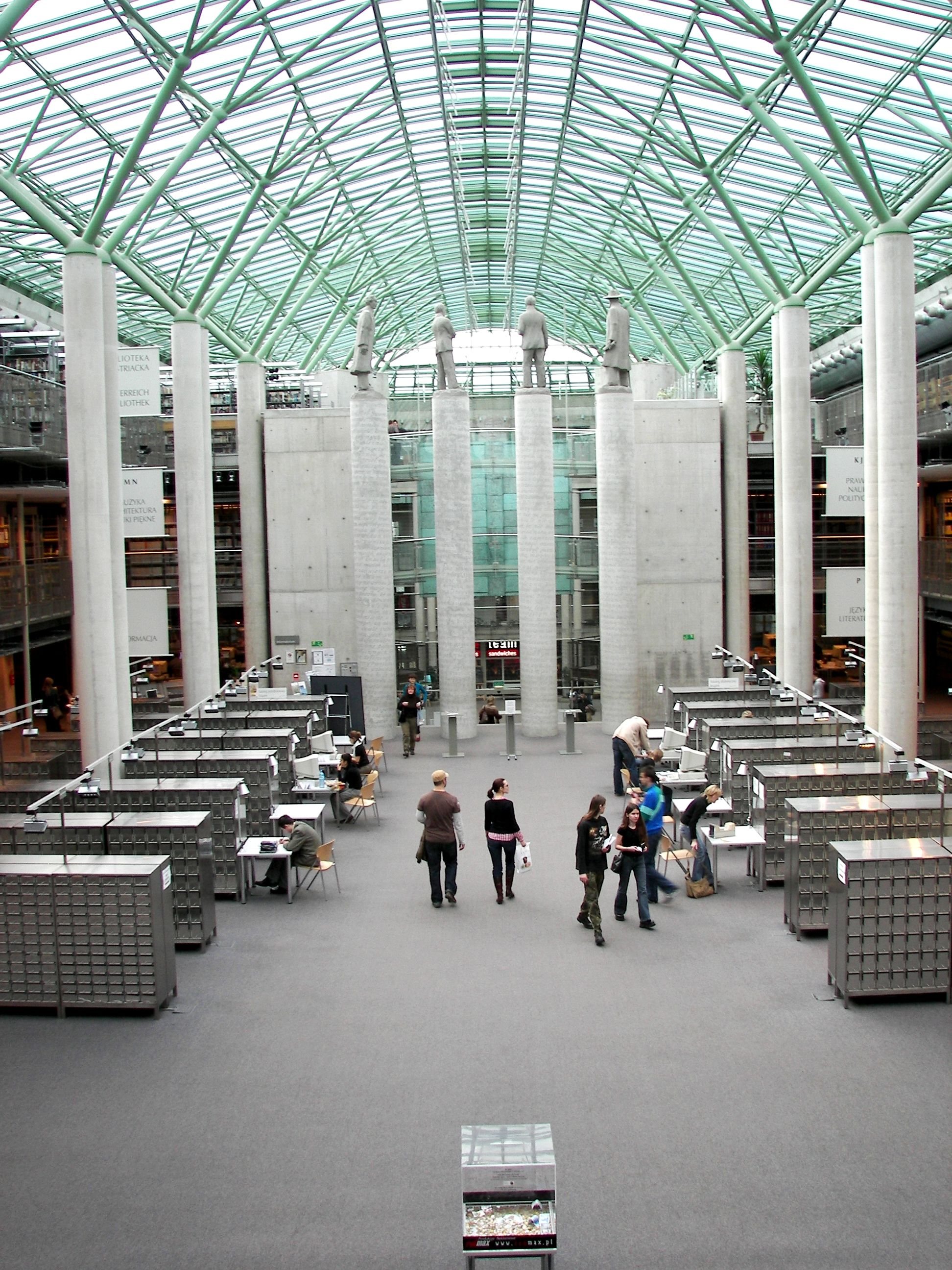
Warsaw University Library – at entrance (seen from rear) are pillared statues of Lwów-Warsaw School philosophers (right to left) Kazimierz Twardowski, Jan Łukasiewicz, Alfred Tarski, Stanisław Leśniewski.

== See also ==
- History of philosophy in Poland
- List of Poles

== Bibliography ==
- Grattan-Guinness, Ivor (2000). In Search of Mathematical Roots. Princeton: Princeton University Press.
- Luschei, Eugene (1962). The Logical Systems of Leśniewski. Amsterdam: North-Holland.
- Miéville, Denis (1984). Un développement des systèmes logiques de Stanisław Leśniewski. European University Studies (in French). Peter Lang Group AG. ISBN 9783261034946.
- Simons, Peter (2000) [1987]. Parts: A Study in Ontology (Reprinted ed.). New York: Oxford University Press. ISBN 978-0-19-169693-0.
- Srzednicki, J. T. J.; Rickey, V. Frederick, eds. (1984). Leśniewski’s Systems: Ontology and Mereology. Dordrecht: Kluwer.
- Surma, Stanisław J. (1978). "On Leśniewski's Systems, Proceedings of XXII Conference on History of Logic 1977/1978". Studia Logica. 36 (4): 247–426. MR 0476370.
- Urbaniak, Rafał (2013). Leśniewski’s Systems of Logic and Foundations of Mathematics. Dordrecht: Springer.
- Woleński, Jan (1989). Logic and Philosophy in the Lwów–Warsaw School. Dordrecht: Kluwer.
