= Jerzy Perzanowski =

Polish logician and ontologist

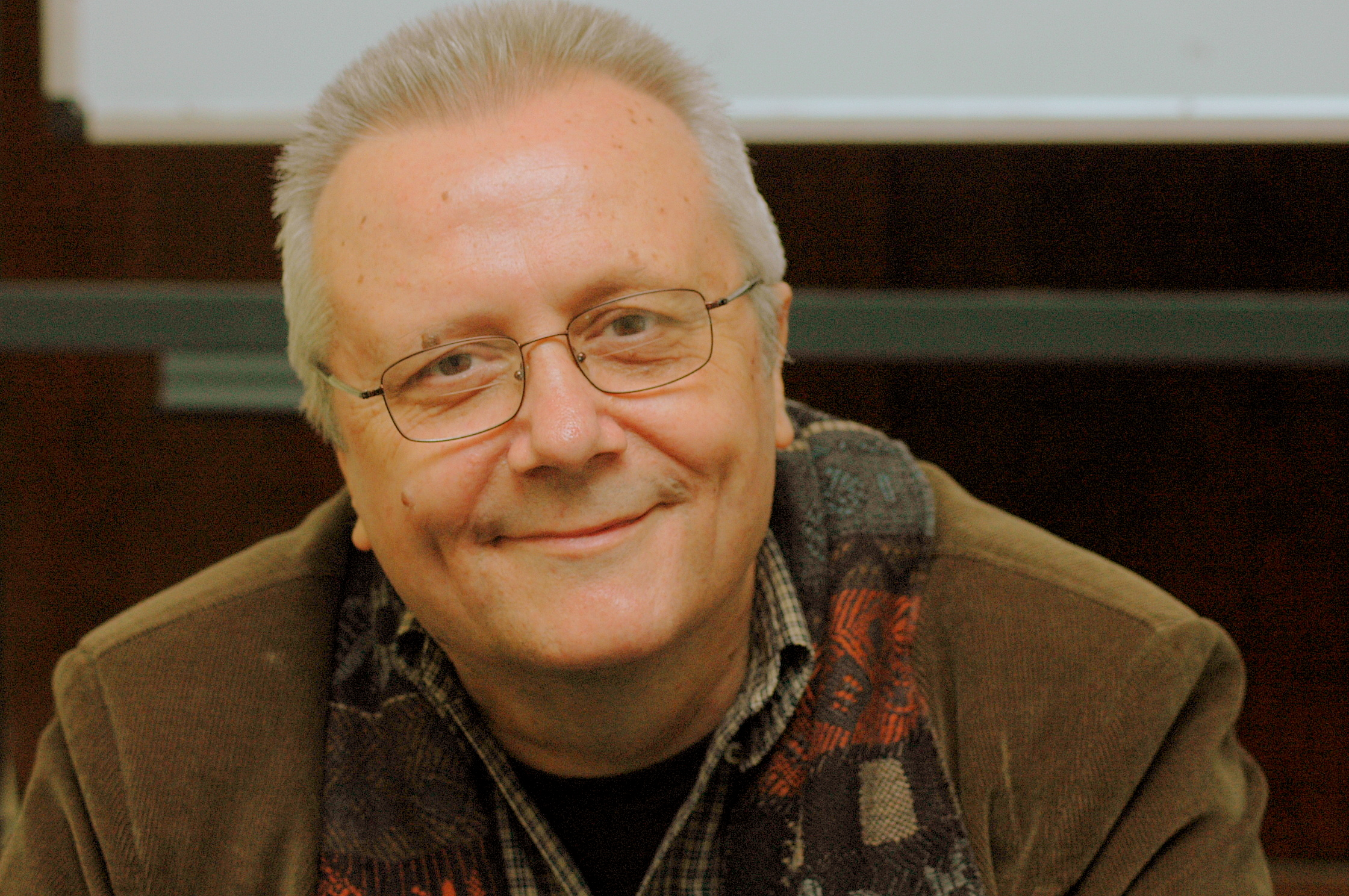
Jerzy Perzanowski

Jerzy Perzanowski (April 23, 1943 in Aix-les-Bains – May 17, 2009 in Bydgoszcz), was a Polish logician and ontologist, Professor of Logic to the University of Toruń (Poland) from 1992 to 2004. Founder of the Polish review Logic and Logical Philosophy, his main contributions are to the development of modal logic, paraconsistent logic and ontology.

== Selected publications in English ==
- Ontologies and ontologics. In: Logic counts. Edited by Zarnecka-Bialy Ewa. Dordrecht: Kluwer 1990. pp. 23–42.
- Towards post-Tractatus ontology. In Wittgenstein. Towards a re-evaluation: Proceedings of the 14th International Wittgenstein-Symposium, centenary celebration, 13–20 August 1989 Kirchberg am Wechsel (Austria). Edited by Haller Rudolf, Haller, and Brandl Johannes. Dordrecht: Kluwer 1990. pp. 185–199.
- What is non-Fregean in the semantics of Wittgenstein's Tractatus and why? Axiomathes 4 (3): 357-372 (1993).
- Modal logics of truth and falsity I. Conceptual and logical framework, and logics of the matrix approach of Boole. In Logik, Begriffe, Prinzipien des Handelns / Logic, concepts, principles of action. Edited by Müller Thomas and Newen Albert. Paderborn: Mentis 2007. pp. 95–112.
- Art of Philosophy. A Selection of Jerzy Perzanowski's Works Frankfurt: Ontos Verlag, 2011.
