= Polish Philosophical Society =

The Polish Philosophical Society is a scientific society based in Poland, founded in 1904 in Lwów by Kazimierz Twardowski.

The statutory goal is to practice and promote philosophy, especially ontology, theory of knowledge, logic, methodology, ethics, history of philosophy as well as the history of social science. During the society's first meeting, Twardowski stated that the only dogma the Society will adhere to was "the conviction that dogmatism is the greatest enemy of scientific work." The society also became part of his drive to reorganize the teaching of philosophy in the universities.

The Society had over 800 members and several branches, which included Częstochowa, Gdańsk, Katowice, Kraków, Lublin, Łódź, Olsztyn, Poznań, Szczecin, Toruń, Warsaw, Wrocław, Zielona Góra. It published the quarterly Ruch Filozoficzny, which was founded in 1911 and later continued by the University of Torun.

The Polish Philosophical Society (PTF) is a member of the International Federation of Philosophical Societies. The headquarters of the society was in Warsaw. The current president (2010) is Władysław Stróżewski.
