= Baroque architecture in Lviv =

Baroque architectural style in Lviv, Ukraine

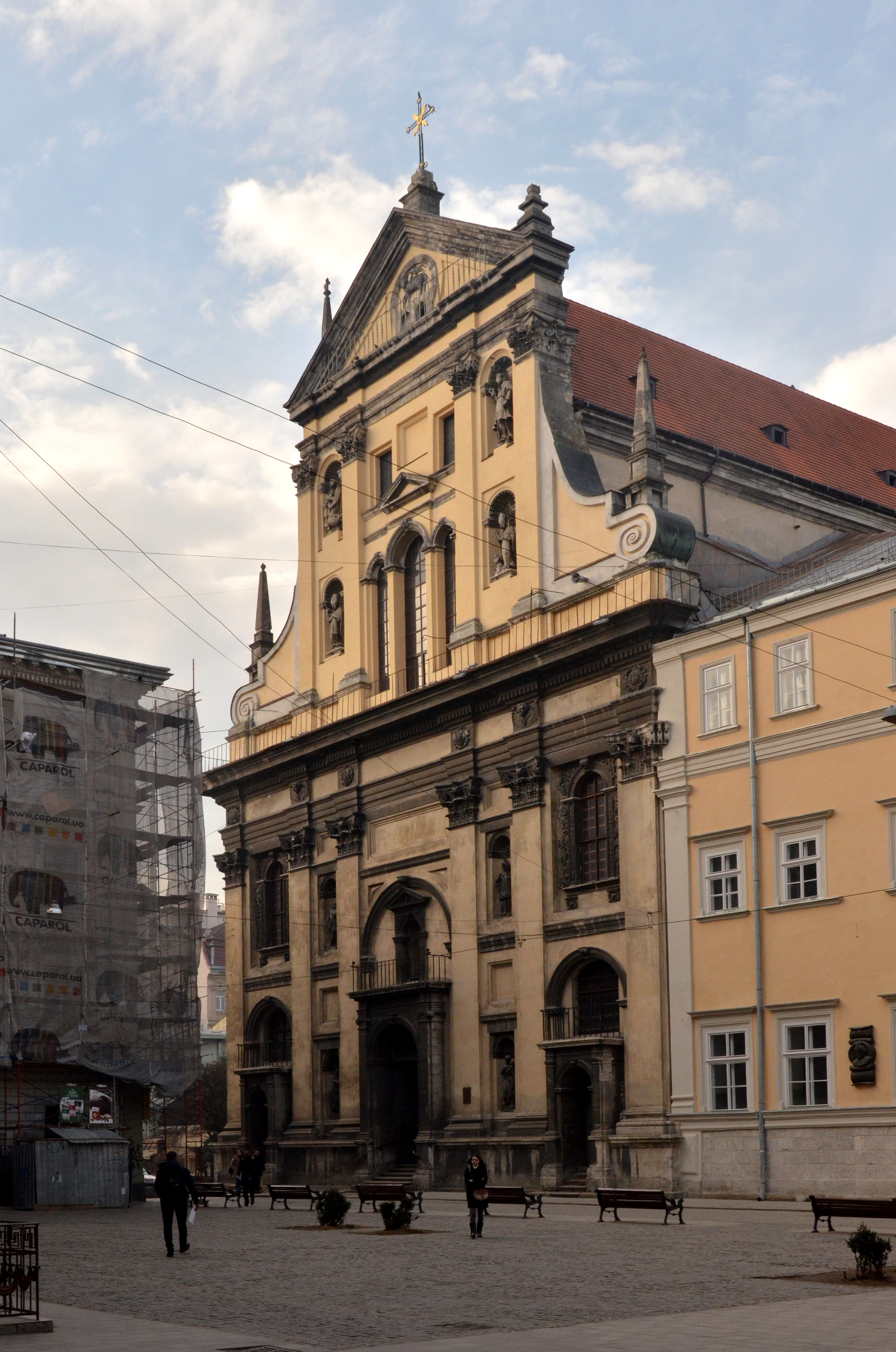
Exterior of the Saints Peter and Paul Jesuit Church

Baroque architecture in Lviv refers to the architectural period of the 17th and 18th centuries in Lviv. Its appearance coincided with the spread of the style in the territories of the Kingdom of Poland, succeeding the Renaissance architecture. Baroque architecture in Lviv makes up a part of the larger Ukrainian Baroque artistic movement.

During the second half of the 16th century and until the middle of the 17th century, Lviv's economic and cultural life has noticeably revived. Development spread to the south, east, and west of the city center. Starting from the second half of the 17th century, the role of the bourgeoisie in construction, and public life in general, gradually declined, the initiative was taken over by secular magnates and catholic orders, who became the main customers of architects and artists.

The Baroque style was introduced in the city at the beginning of the 17th century with the construction of the Jesuit Saints Peter and Paul Garrison Church. The church was designed by Giacomo Briano and modeled after the Church of the Gesù in Rome. It is considered to be the first Baroque church in modern Ukraine and one of the first in the Polish-Lithuanian Commonwealth. In the same century, the Baroque complexes of the Discalced Carmelite, Magdalene, and Lazarus monasteries were constructed in Lviv. Baroque has gradually become the dominant style at the end of the 17th century, and reached its peak in the middle of the 18th century.

== Secular architecture ==
During the first half of the 17th century, the builders of the city's bricklayers' guild continued to build in the late Renaissance style. The facades of buildings on peripheral streets were decorated with rather modest decorations. Buildings in the style of advanced Baroque appeared at the end of the 17th century, mainly in magnate residences around the city, in particular in the castles belonging to King Jan III Sobieski (Zolochiv, Zhovkva, Olesko), near which parterre parks were laid out. In Lviv, the Jablonowski Palace was built, and the Korniakt Palace belonging to Sobieski was rebuilt (1678), which received a high attic on its facade. The adoption of firewalls that separated neighboring buildings and prevented the spread of fires, led to the spread of attics on the facades of many kamienice.

From the middle of the 18th century a number of buildings in the late Baroque style appeared in the areas adjacent to the city centre - the palaces of the princes Wiśniowiecki, Radziwiłł, Chetvertynsky, the nobles Rzewuski, Kossakowski, Kalinowski, Granowski, Bekerski, Szekezynski, Hadzewicz, as well as Burgomaster Carlo Garani (1734), which have not survived to this day or were significantly rebuilt.

The palaces of princes Lubomirski (1760), Catholic archbishops (1634), Greek Catholic metropolitans (1762), and Armenian archbishops were rebuilt from bourgeois tenement houses. A number of residential buildings were also built on Rynok Square, which have preserved their appearance to this day, were rebuilt, in particular the Rottendorf, Kilianishchynska, and Bandinelli houses. The bourgeois kamienice were rebuilt with the separation of the apartments to several co-owners, which led to the later appearance of the revenue houses. From the late 1760s, with the reconstruction of the facades of tenement houses in the Rococo style, such as Francweningowska on Rynok Square, the Classicist style began to spread quickly.

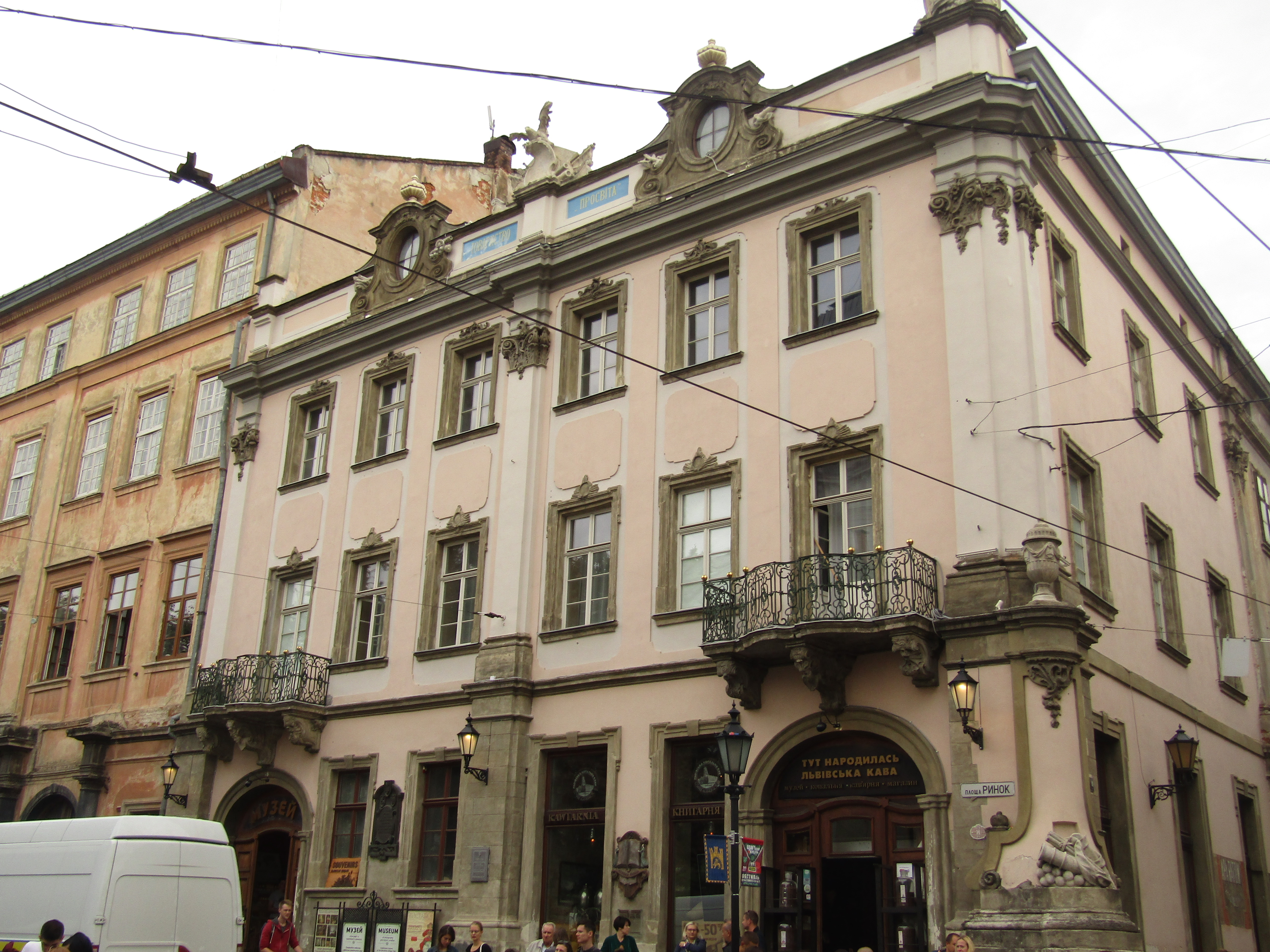
Lubomirski Palace, Rynok Square

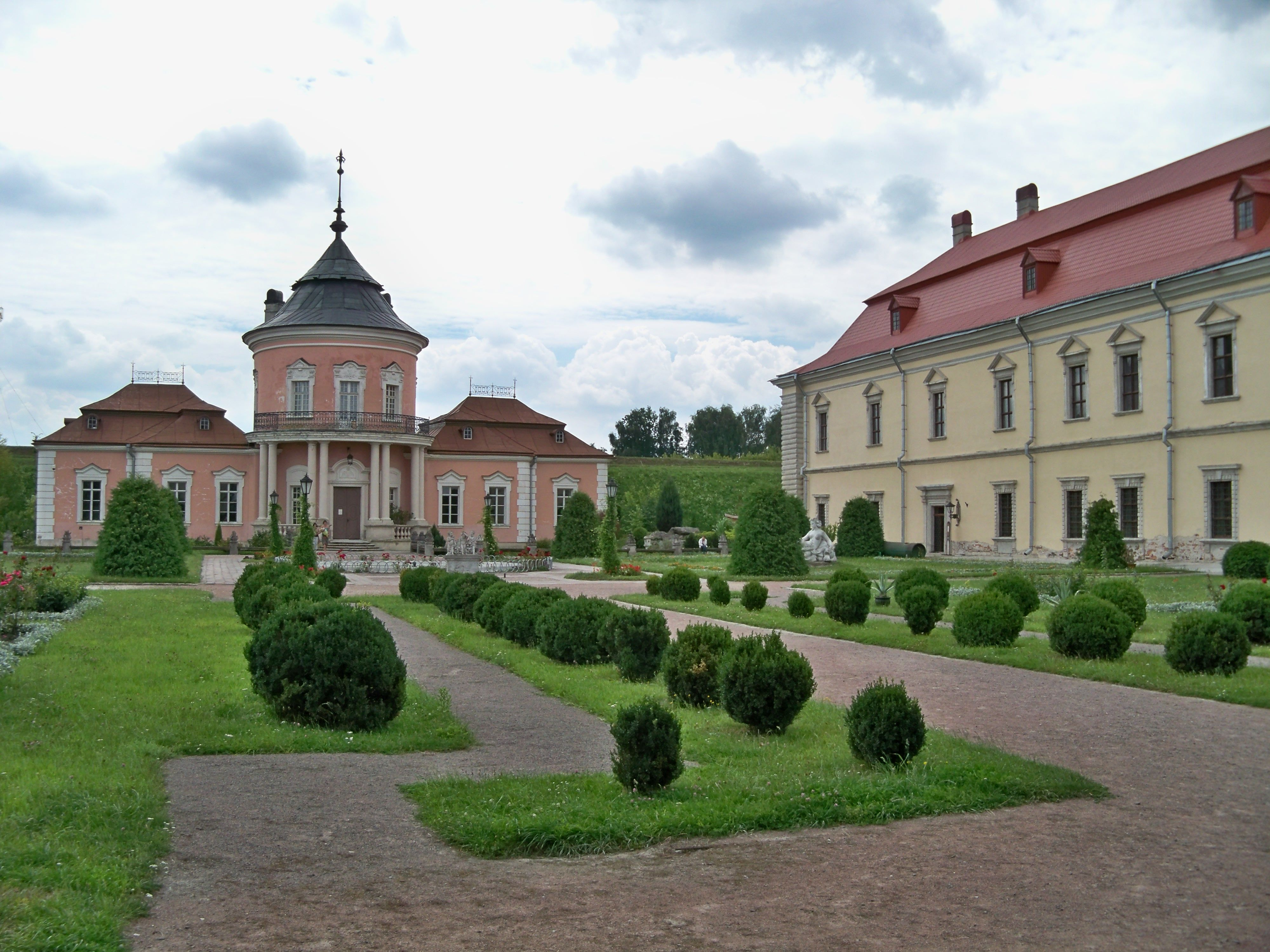
Zolochiv Castle

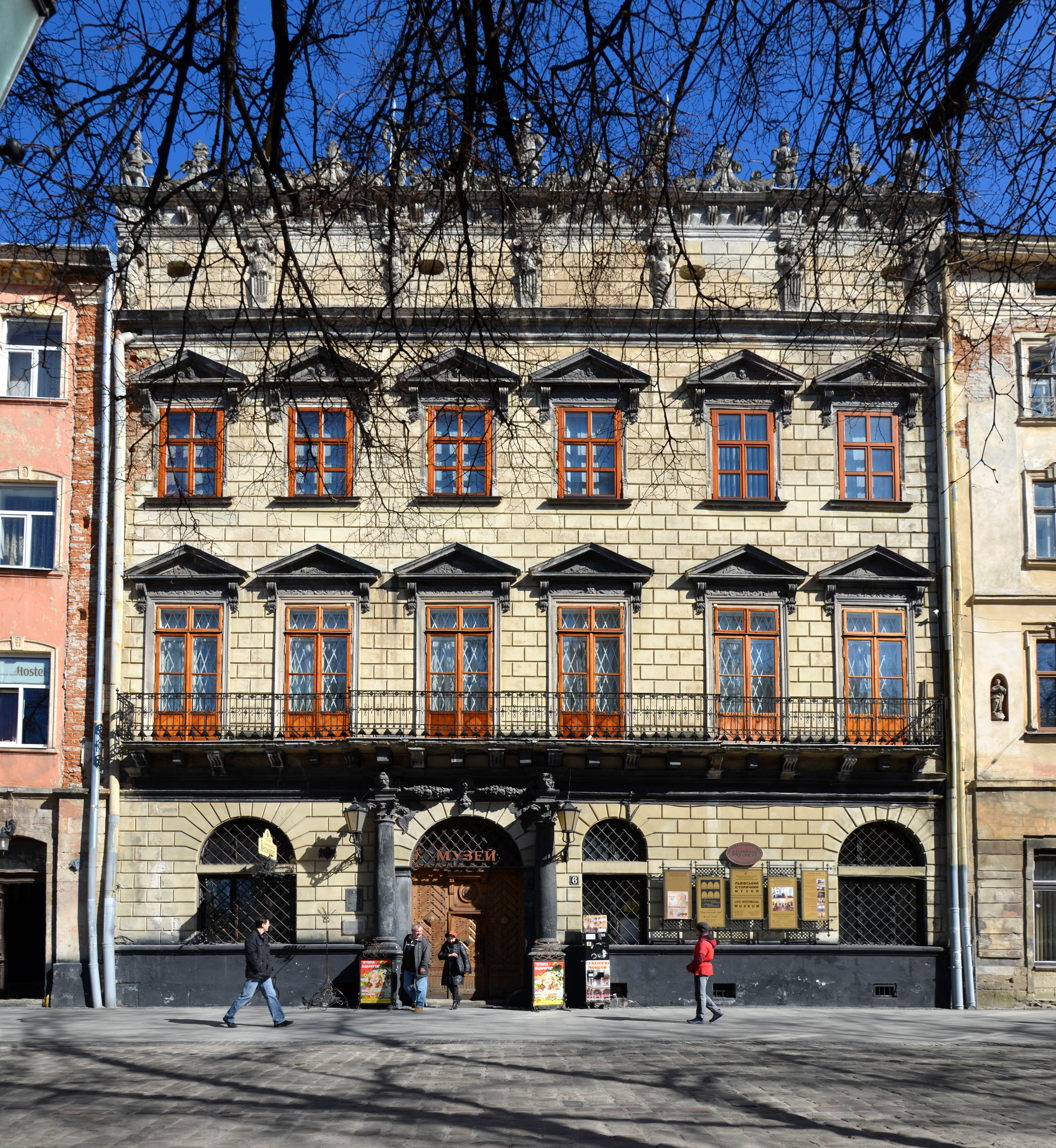
Korniakt Palace, Rynok Square

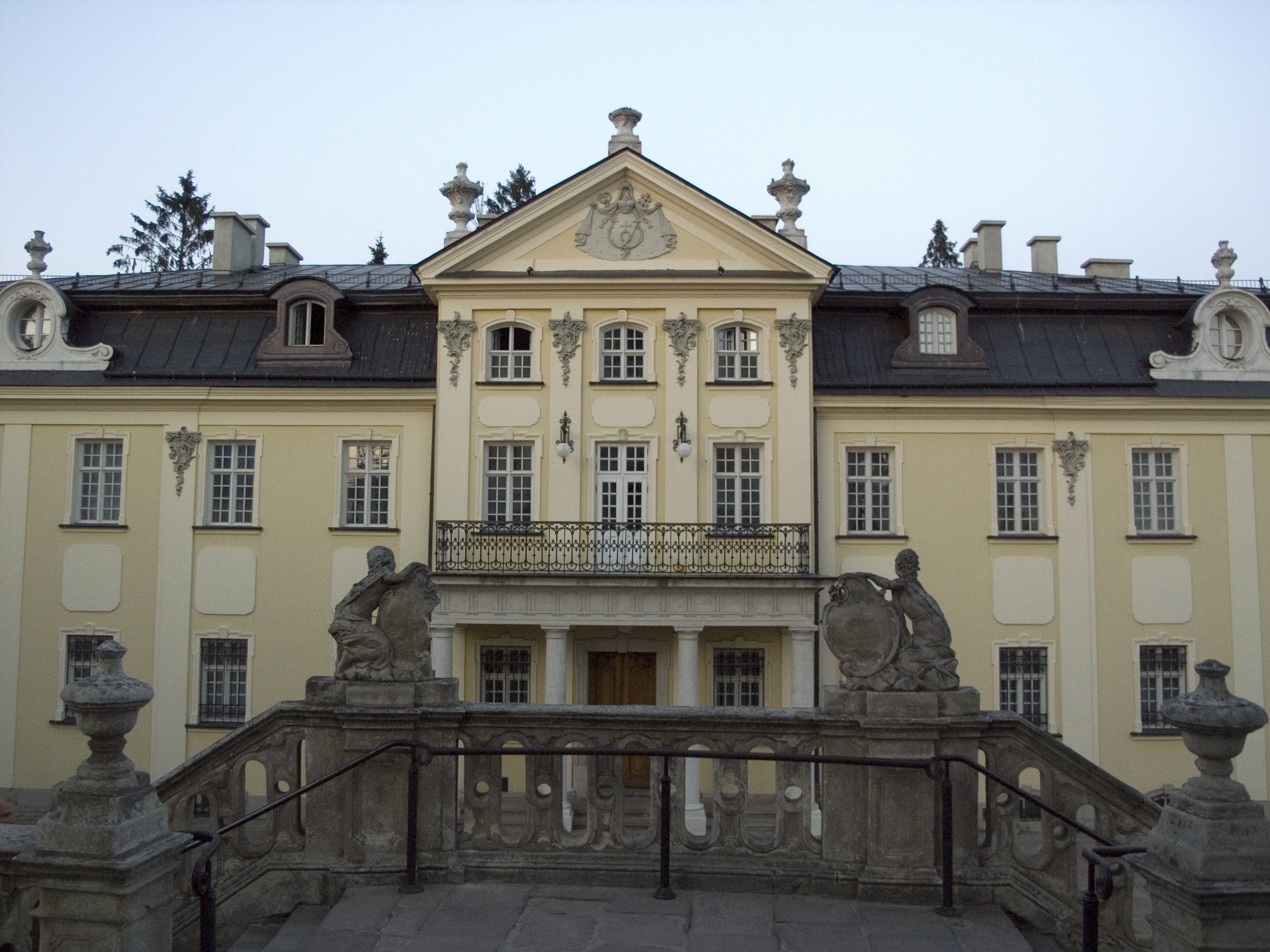
Metropolitans Palace, St. George's Cathedral

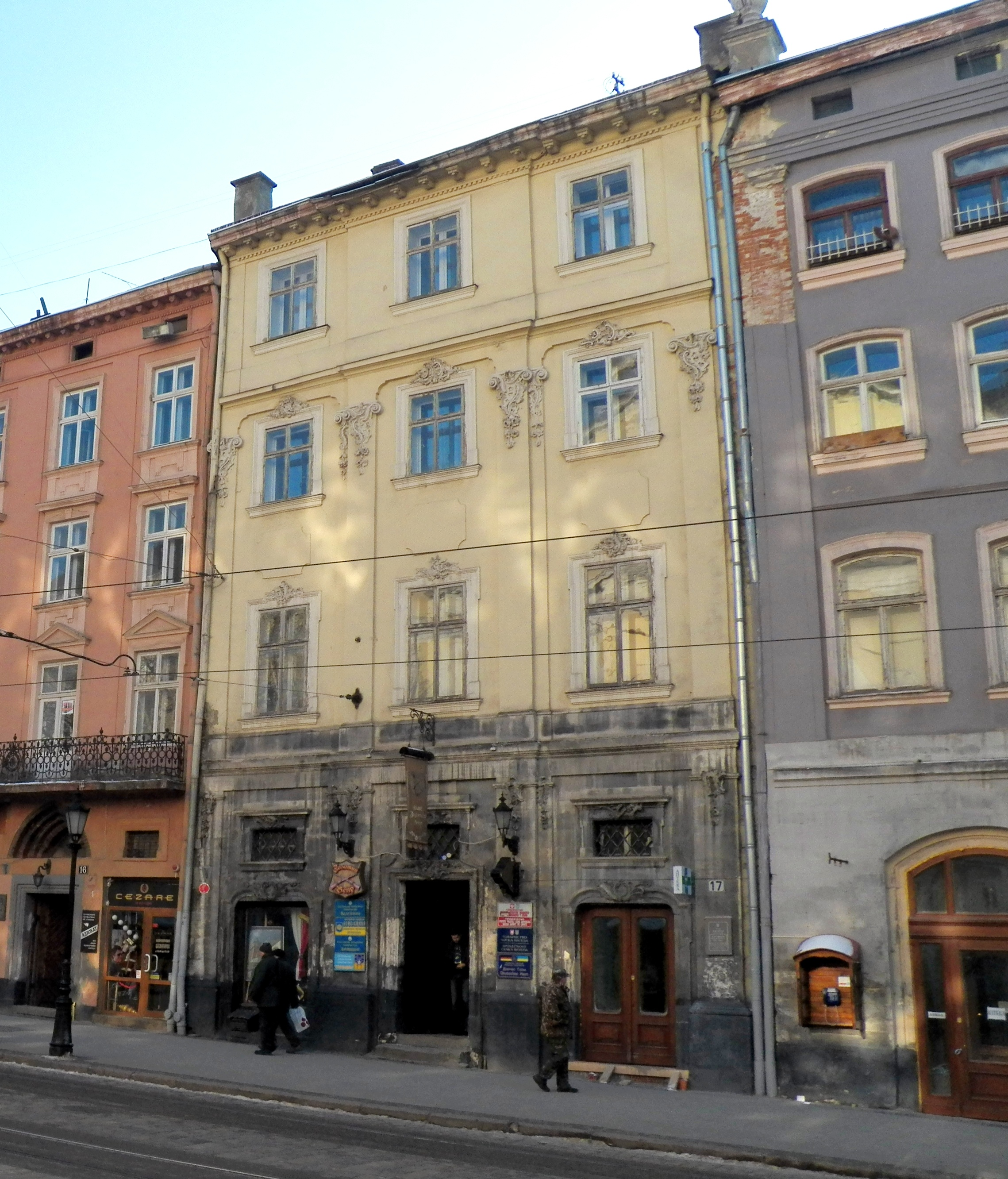
Francweningowska House, Rynok Square

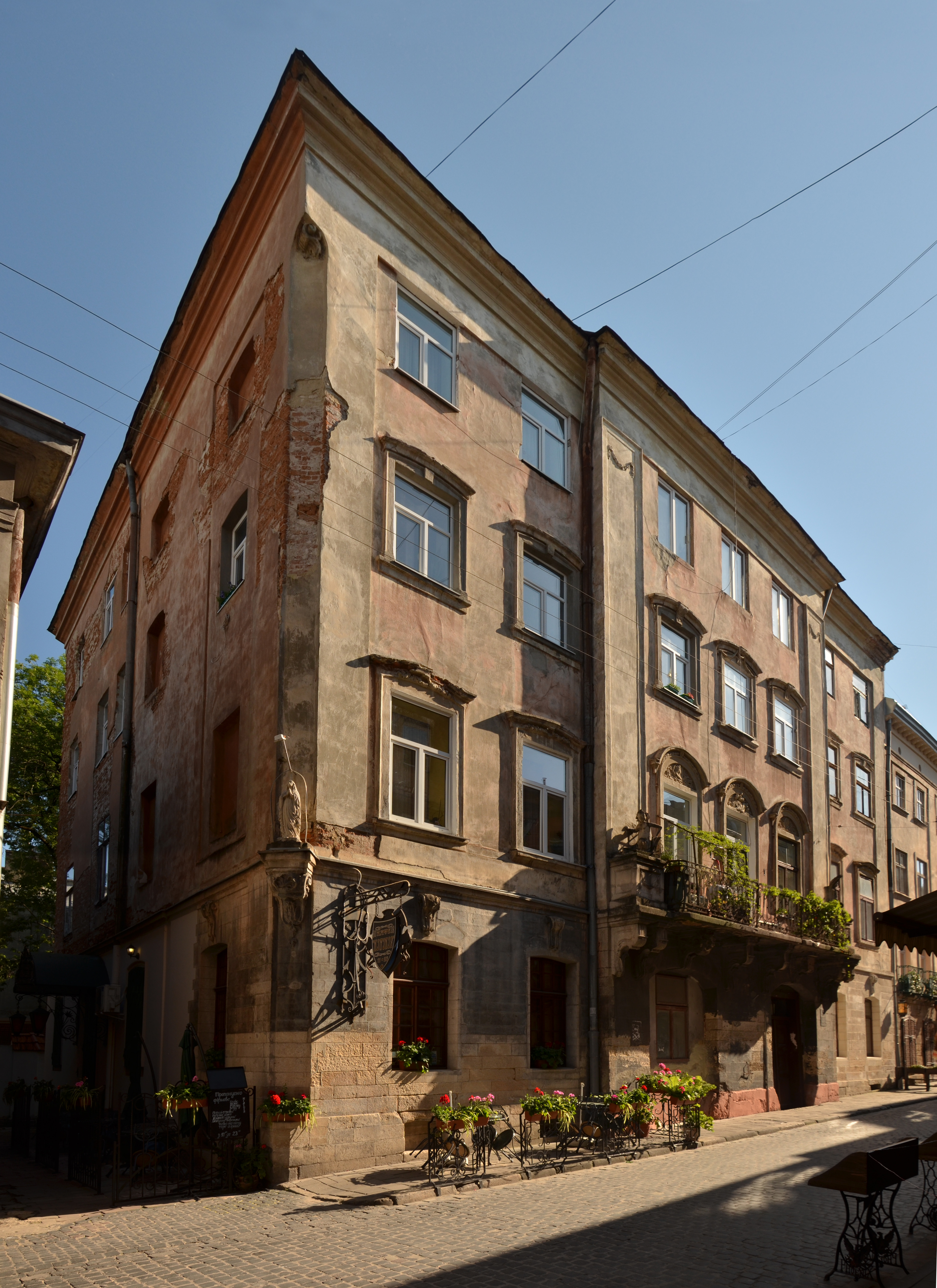
Mira Palace, Virmenska Street

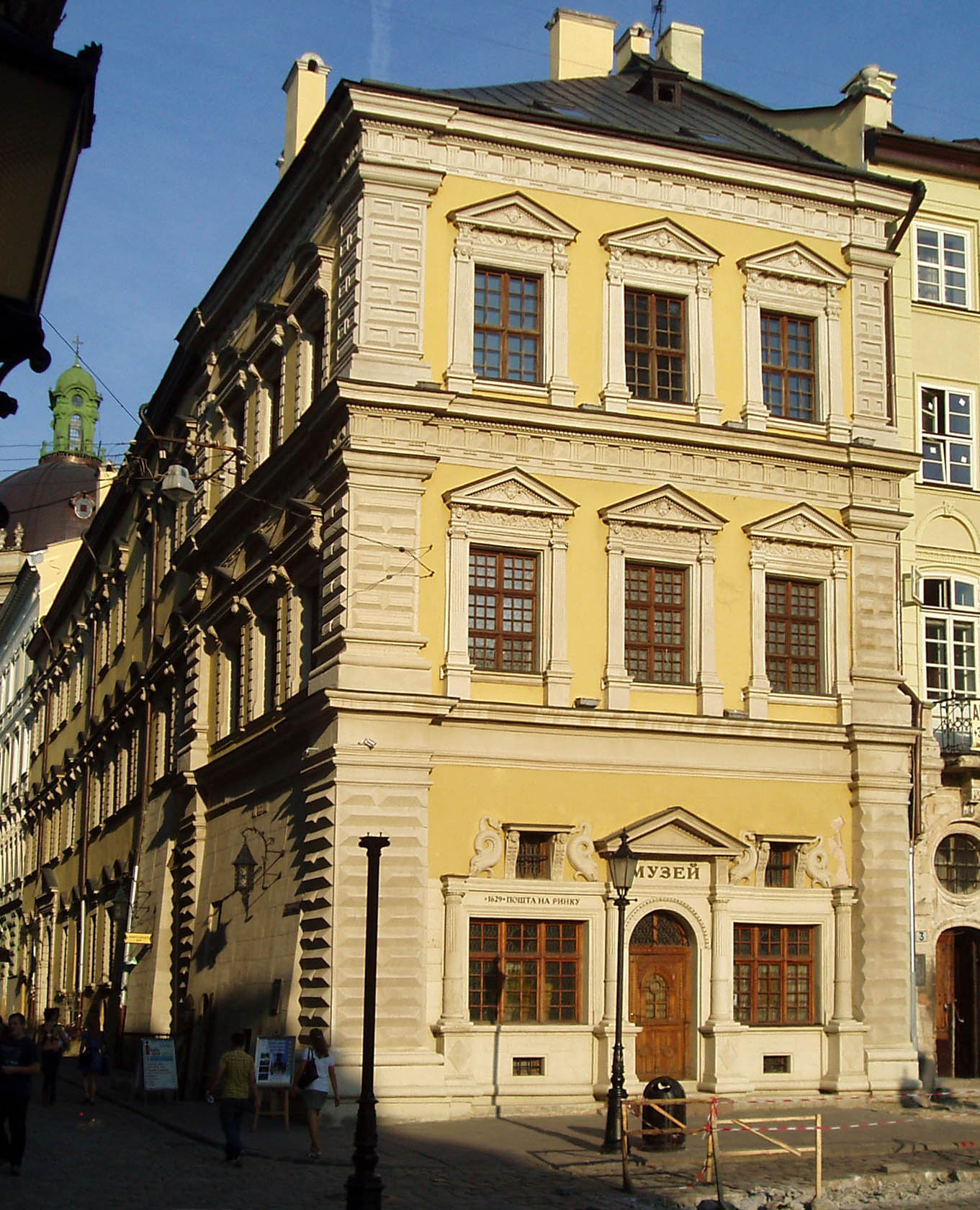
Bandinelli Palace, Rynok Square

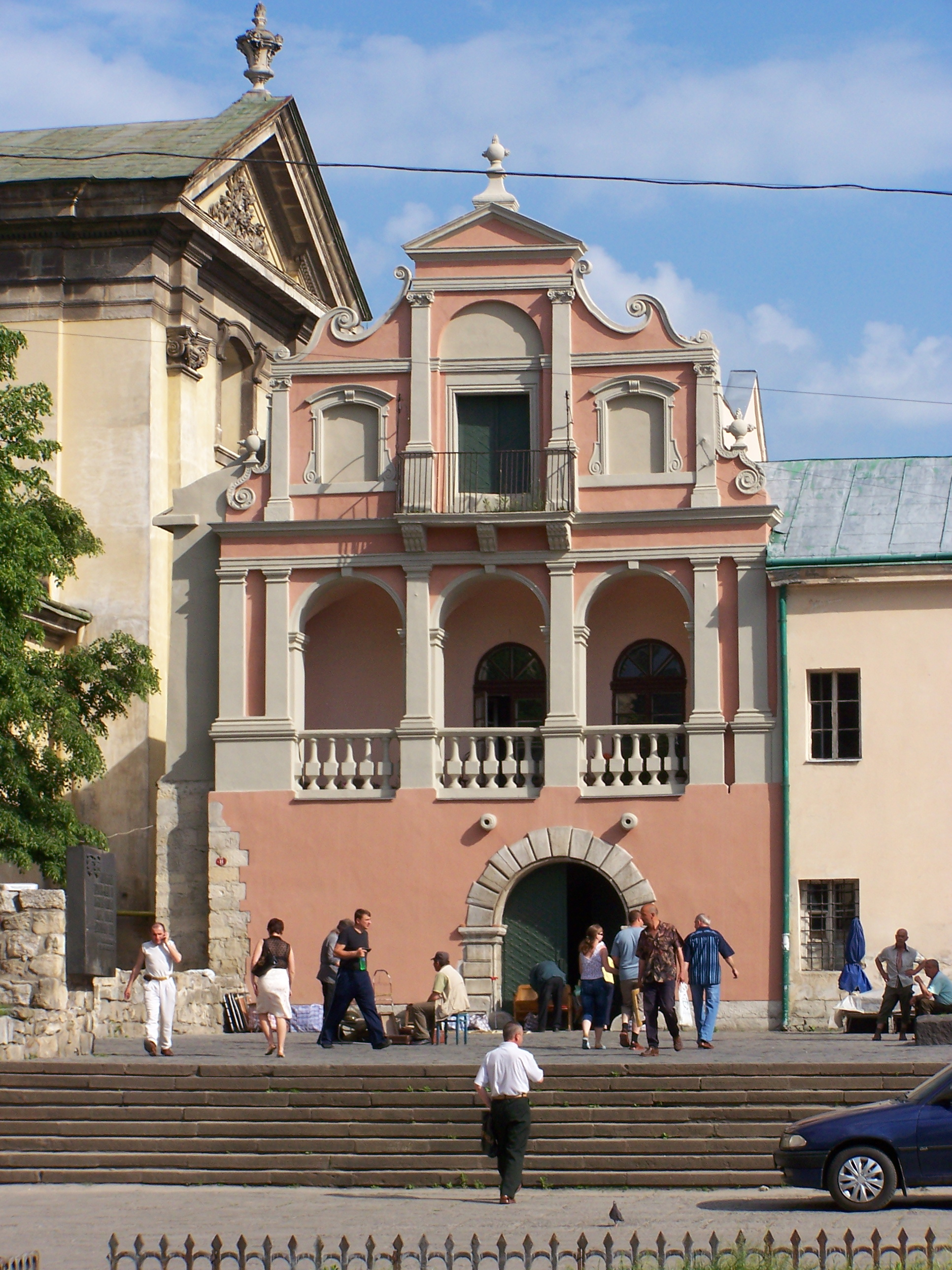
Royal Arsenal, Pidvalna Street

=== Military architecture ===
A few traces of the city's Baroque military architecture, on which royal architects Paweł Grodzicki, Friedryk Getkant, and Andrea del Acqua worked, remain. The Royal Arsenal (1639-1646) and several fragments of monastery fortifications have survived in their rebuilt form. During the 17th-18th centuries, the city fortifications were modernized with the reconstruction of the city gates. Only a sketch of the new Jesuit Gate from the 1770s has survived. No mentions or images of the appearance of the gates in the fourth line of defense of the military commandant Jan Berens from the end of the 18th century have survived. A small fragment of its bastion has survived to this day.

=== Educational institutions ===
The Baroque period saw the development of education in the city, accompanied by the construction of the buildings of the Jesuit collegium (1612). Later 18th-century buildings of the Theatines collegium (1744) and the Jesuit Nobilium (1749) were built in the late Baroque style with elements of Classicism.

== Religious architecture ==
The development of the city's Baroque religious architecture followed a different path, as royal court architects, not limited by guild norms, worked on them. In 1642, according to the design of Giovanni Gisleni, the Presentation Church of the Monastery of the Discalced Carmelites was built, modeled after the Santa Susanna church in Rome. Later, the churches of St. Casimir (1664), Bonifrate St. Lawrence (1659), Carmelite St. Agnes (1716), St. Leonard (1720s), St. Martin (1736) and St. Michael (1634–1732), Franciscan St. Anthony (1718), Capuchin Monastery (1730), Augustinian St. Anne (1673, 1730), Trinitarian St. Nicholas (1739), Benedictine Church and Monastery of the Sacraments (1744), Dominican St. Mary Magdalene (1754–1758), and St. Sophia (1765) were built. At the same time, churches were still being built in the late Renaissance style with a significant influence of northern Mannerism.

The Korniakt Tower (1695) and the interior decoration of the Bernardine Church (1738-1740) received Baroque finishes. The Baroque stucco decoration of the vault of the Jesuit Church gave way to illusory painting. Regular parterre gardens were laid out at monasteries and palaces, on which Francis and Sebastian Eckstein, Giuseppe Pedretti, Benedikt Mazurkiewicz and Stanisław Strojinski worked together with their students. The artist Luka Dolynski worked on the decoration of the churches.

In the second quarter of the 18th century, several more monuments of late Baroque architecture appeared, which are not distinguished by special stylistic characteristics. Among them is the Church of St. Anne, which dates back to 1730. A very late element of the structure is the tower, completed at the beginning of the 20th century by Bronisław Wiktor. The monastery building, which stands next to it, has preserved the characteristic features of 18th-century architecture. The facade of the Church of St. Martin has a richer architectural and decorative decoration. The curved lines of the pediment, deep niches, decorative flowerpots and strong creping with double pilasters give the facade picturesqueness.

The Baroque era in Lviv ended with the reconstruction of the Latin Cathedral (1765–1771), the construction of the Dominican Church (1749–1764), and the St. George's Cathedral (1744–1762), which are considered to be the highlights of Baroque architecture in Ukraine. Among the most notable architects were Peter Beber, Marcin Urbanik, Bernard Meretyn, Johann Georg Pinsel, Jan de Witte and Petro Poleyovsky.

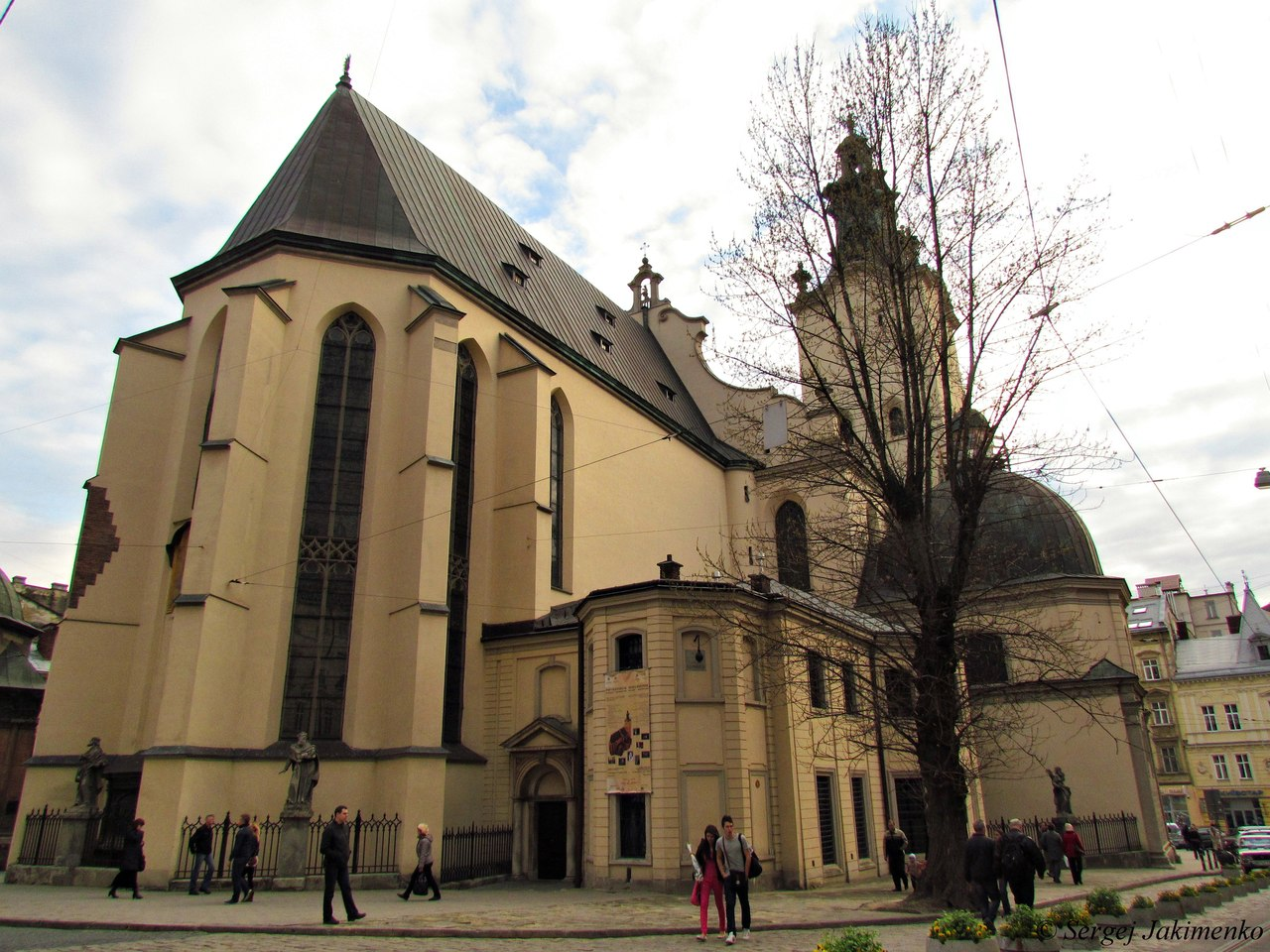
Latin cathedral

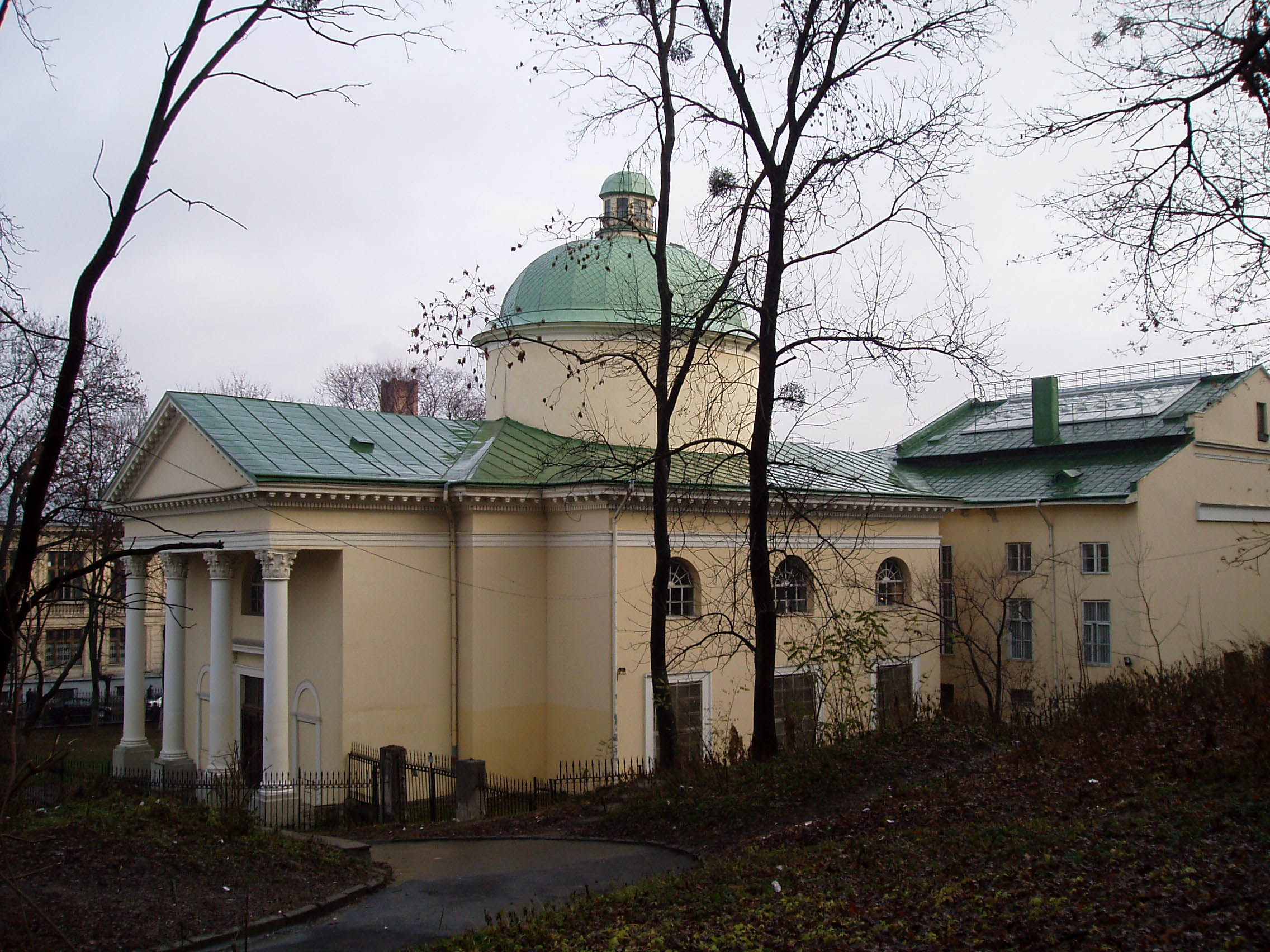
Carmelite monastery

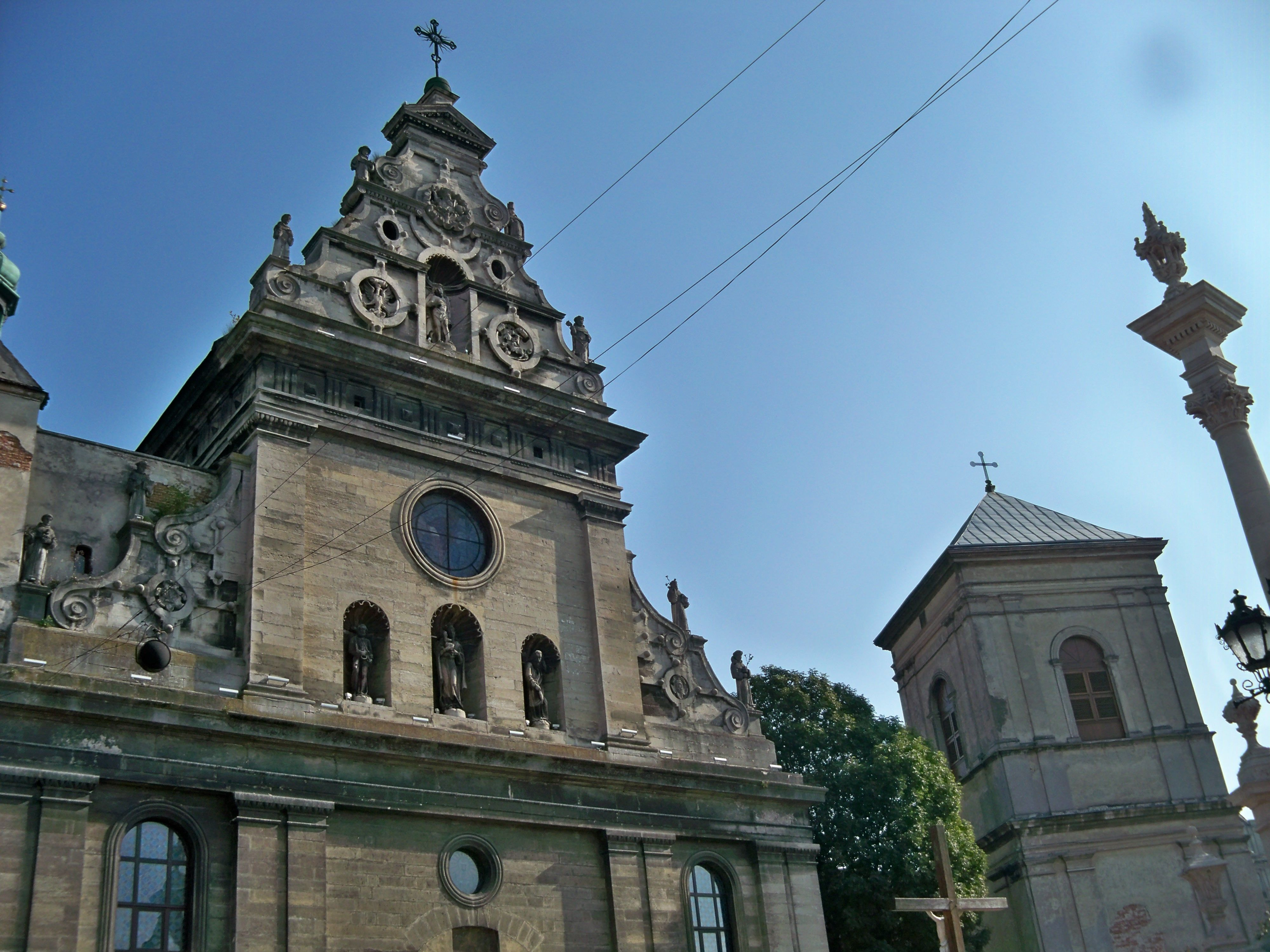
Bernardine church

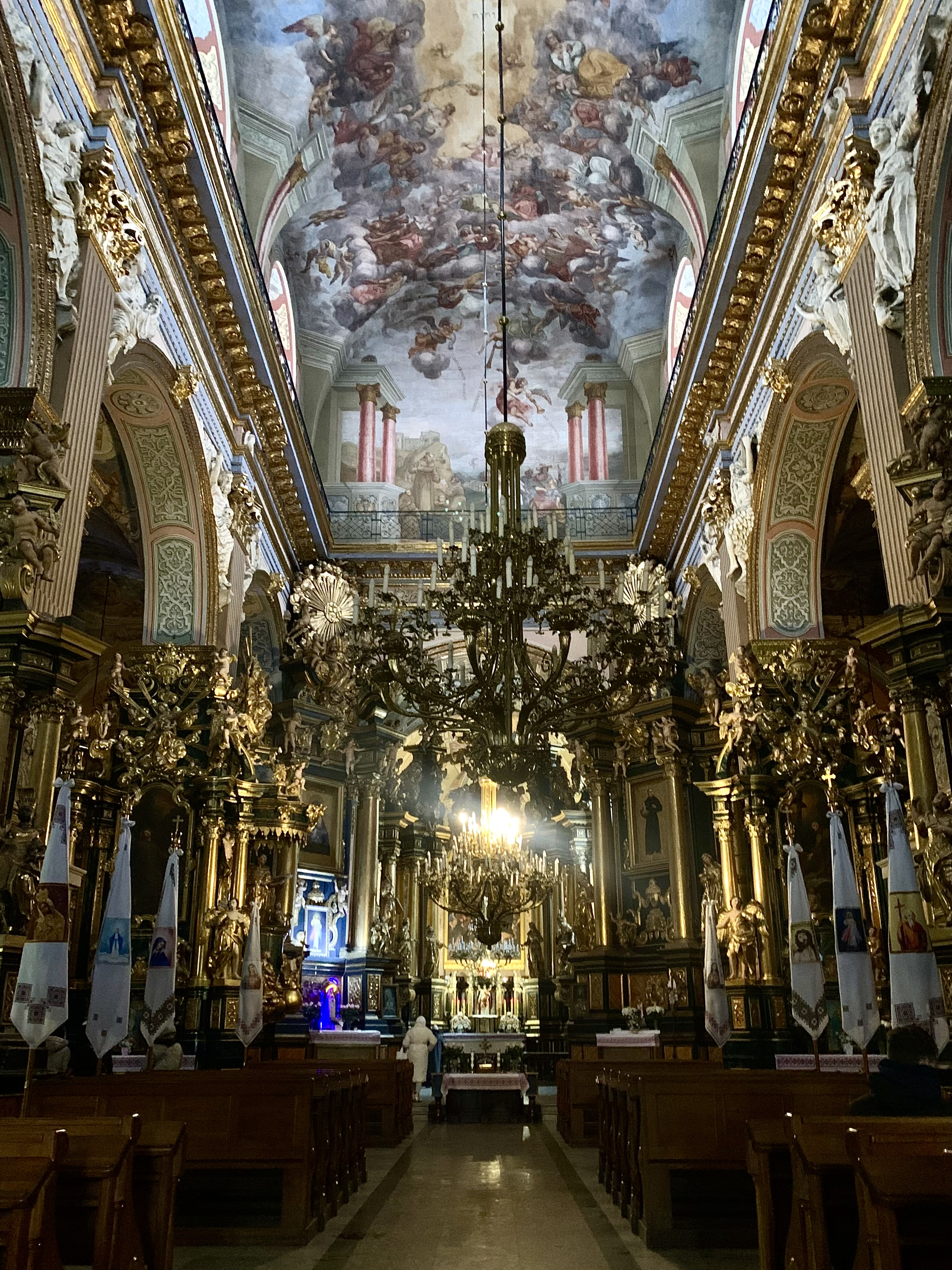
Interior of the Bernardine church

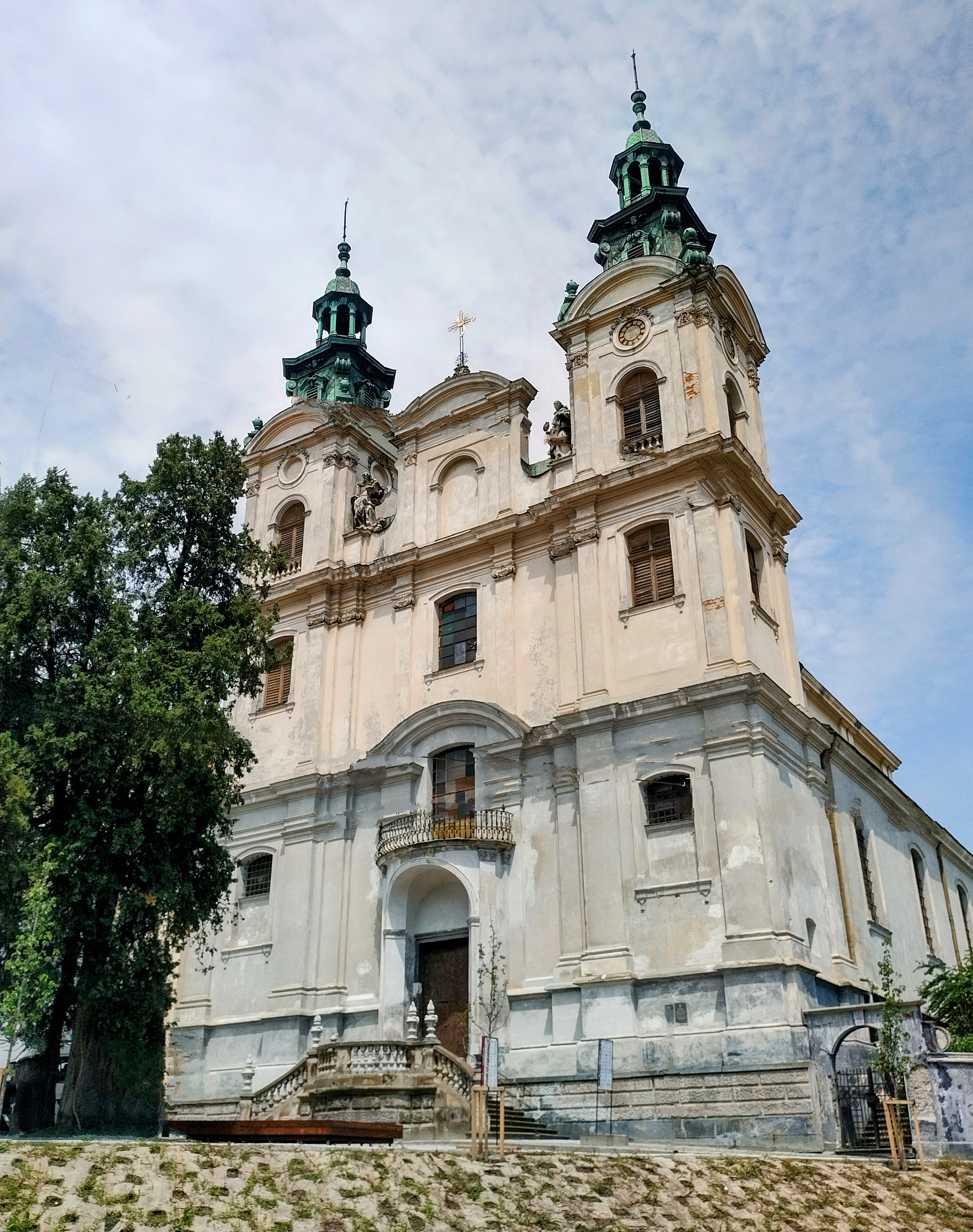
St. Mary Magdalene church — Lviv Organ Hall

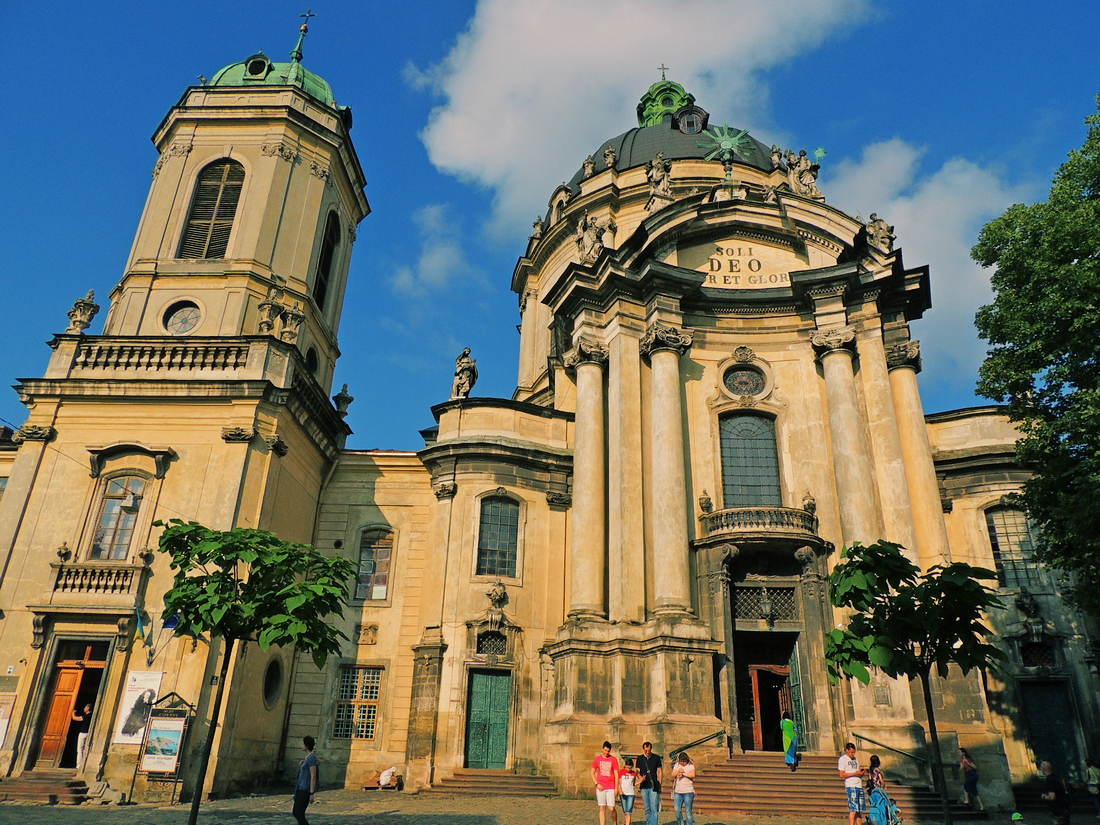
Dominican church

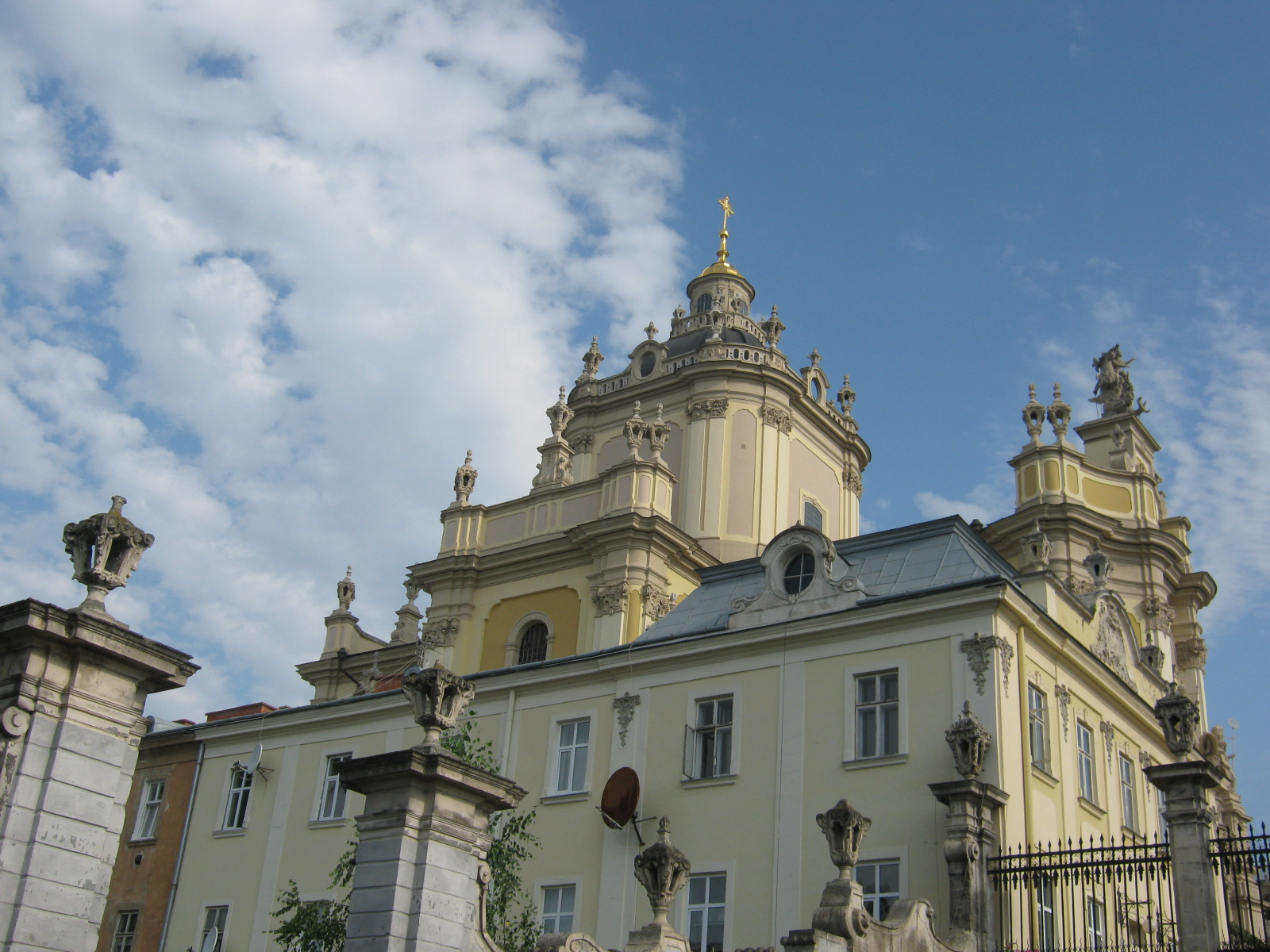
St. George Greek Catholic cathedral

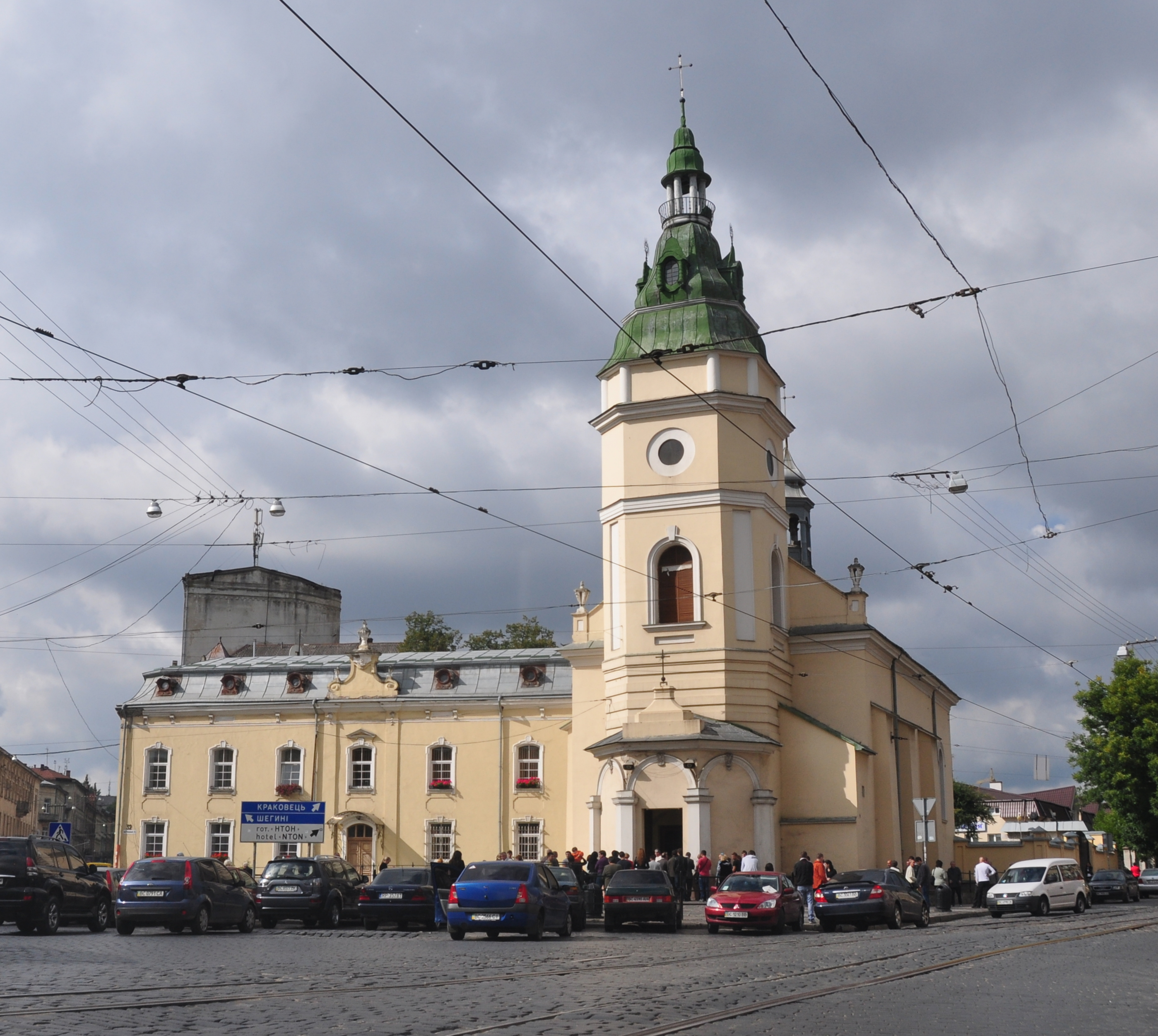
St. Anne church

== Sources ==
- Архітектура Львова: Час і стилі. XIII—XXI ст / М. Бевз, Ю. Бірюльов, Ю. Богданова, В. Дідик, У. Іваночко, Т. Клименюк та інші. — Львів : Центр Європи, 2008. — С. 123—126. — 2000 прим. — ISBN 978-966-7022-77-8.
- Ю. Бірюльов. Бароко // Енциклопедія Львова: в 4 т / за ред. А. Козицького та І. Підкови. — Львів : Літопис, 2007. — Т. 1: А—Ґ. — С. 180—183. — ISBN 978-966-7007-68-8.
- Вуйцик В. С., Липка Р. М. Зустріч зі Львовом: Путівник. — Львів : Каменяр, 1987. — 175 с.
- Вуйцик В. С. Державний історико-архітектурний заповідник у Львові. — Львів : Каменяр, 1979. — 129 с.
- Вуйцик В. С. Державний історико-архітектурний заповідник у Львові. — 2-ге вид. — Львів : Каменяр, 1991. — 175 с. — ISBN 978-5-7745-0358-2.
- Вуйцик В. С. Фортифікатори Львова XV—XVII ст. // Вісник інституту «Укрзахідпроектреставрація». — 1994. — № 2. — С. 18—23.
- Ігор Качор, Любов Качор. Львів крізь віки. — Львів : Центр Європи, 2004. — 240 с. — ISBN 978-966-7022-44-0.
- Ігор Качор, Любов Качор. Середньовічний Львів. Фортифікації. — Львів : Апріорі, 2009. — 64 с. — ISBN 978-966-2154-22-1.
- Ігор Качор, Любов Качор. Марево давнього Львова. — Львів : Апріорі, 2009. — 164 с. — ISBN 978-966-2154-03-0.
- Крип'якевич І. Історичні проходи по Львові / Авт. передм. Я. Д. Ісаєвич; Упоряд., текстолог, опрац. і прим. Б. З. Якимовича; Упоряд. іл. матеріалу Р. І. Крип'якевича; Худож. В. М. Павлик. — Львів : Каменяр, 1991. — 167 с. — ISBN 5-7745-0316 -Х.
- Памятники градостроительства и архитектуры Украинской ССР / Н. Л. Жариков (ред.). — Киев : Будивельник, 1985. — Т. 3: Львовская, Николаевская, Одесская, Полтавская, Ровенская области. — 337 с. (рос.)
- Janusz Witwicki Obwarowania śródmieścia Lwowa // Kwart. Architektury i Urbanistyki. — T. XVI. — 1971.
