= Witwicki =

Witwicki is a Polish surname. Notable people with the surname include:

- Janusz Witwicki (1903–1946), Polish architect and art historian
- Stefan Witwicki (1801–1847), Polish poet
- Władysław Witwicki (1878–1948), Polish psychologist, philosopher, translator and artist
