= Madonna and Child of Chortkiv =

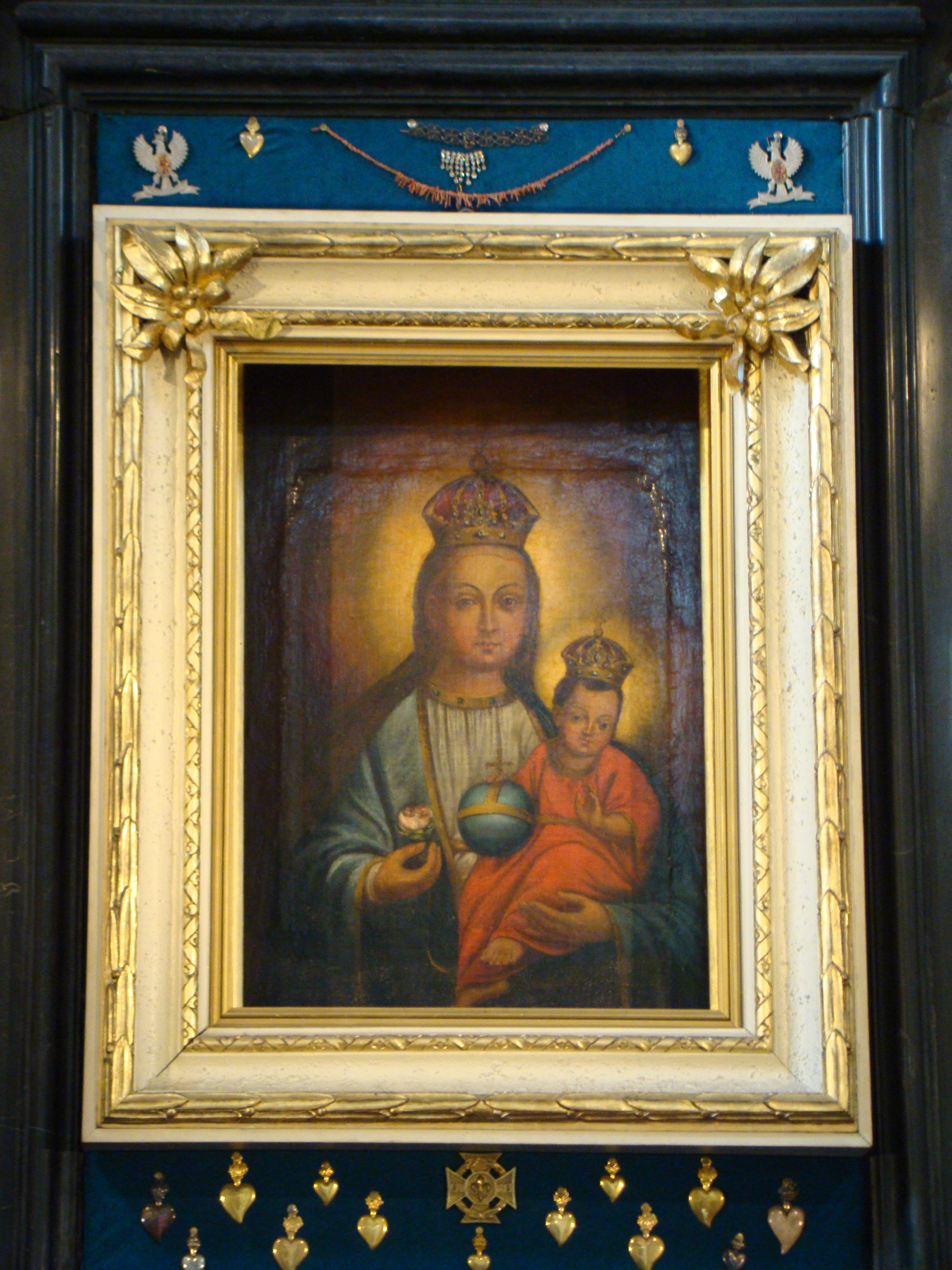
Miraculous icon of Virgin Mary of the Holy Rosary of Chortkiv in the chapel of the Kotowski St. Hyacinth's church of Warsaw

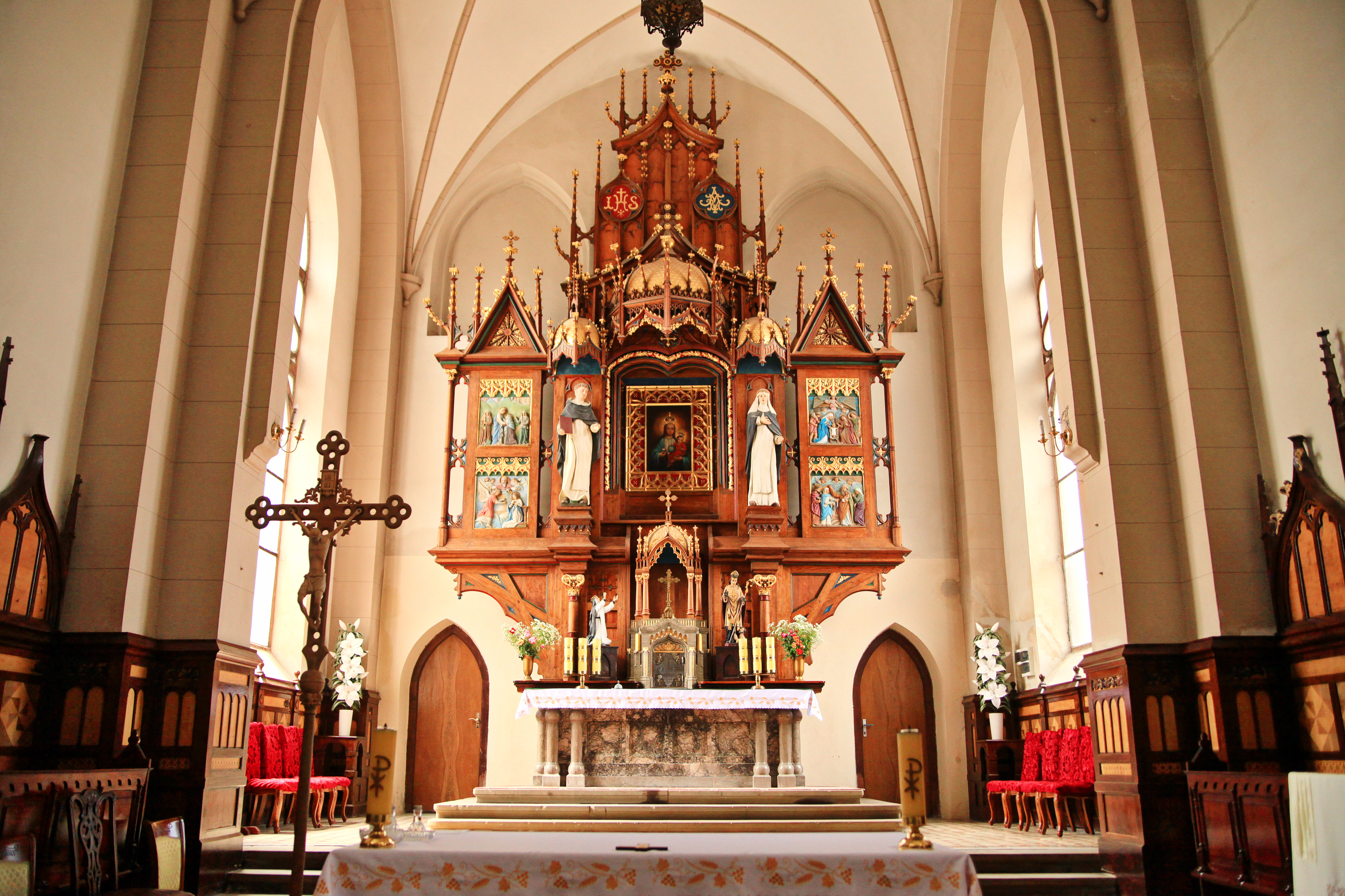
An exact replica of the Miraculous icon of Virgin Mary of the Holy Rosary of Chortkiv in the main altar of the Saint Stanislaus church of Chortkiv.

The Madonna and Child of Chortkiv is a miraculous crowned icon of the Virgin Mary, which is located in the chapel of the Kotowski St. Hyacinth's church of Warsaw, Poland.

== History ==
The miraculous icon originated from Astrowna near Vitebsk (late 15th century), where it was known as the Astrowna's icon. In 1654, during the period of Muscovite expansion into the Belarusian lands, the Dominican Order secretly took the image to the Saint Mary Magdalene church of Lviv, where 86 miracles were recorded over the course of ten years.

In 1663, during a military campaign against Moscow, the King of Poland, Jan Kazimierz, presented the Dominican Order of Chortkiv with an icon with a Latin inscription: "Jan Kazimierz, King of Poland, was in Chortkiv with a miraculous icon from Astrowna".

In 1945, the holy relic was transported to Kraków, where it was first conserved, and in September 1983 it was placed in the chapel of the Kosowski St. Hyacinth's church in Warsaw.

In 2002, the crown for the exact copy of the Warsaw icon was blessed by Pope John Paul II and placed on the temples of Jesus and Virgin Mary by Lviv Metropolitan Archbishop Mieczyslaw Mokrzycki. On 29 August 2009, the solemn coronation of the miraculous icon of the Virgin Mary of the Holy Rosary took place, which is now located in the main altar of the Saint Stanislaus Church in Chortkiv.
