= Dmytro Dunaievskyi =

Ukrainian painter (1905–1944)

- Дмитро Йосипович Дунаєвський
- Born: 9 August 1906; Berestechko, now Volyn Oblast, Ukraine
- Died: July 1944 (aged 38) near Brody, Lviv Oblast
- Education: Lviv Art and Industrial School, Oleksa Novakivskyi Art School, Warsaw Academy of Arts
- Occupation: Painter

Dmytro Dunaievskyi (Ukrainian: Дмитро Йосипович Дунаєвський; 26 October 1905 – July 1944) was a Ukrainian painter and a participant in the national liberation struggle. Member of the Ukrainian art circle "Spokii" in Warsaw (1928–1939).

== Biography ==
Dmytro Dunaievskyi was born on 26 October 1905, in Berestechko, now Volyn Oblast, Ukraine.

In 1925, he graduated from the Lviv Art and Industrial School. In 1927, he completed his studies at the Oleksa Novakivskyi Art School in Lviv, and in 1932, at the Warsaw Academy of Arts (his specialized teachers were M. Kotarbiński and T. Pruszkowski).

He was a participant in the liberation struggle as part of the Halychyna Division. He was a like-minded individual and comrade-in-arms of Nil Khasevych. He died in July 1944 near Brody, Lviv Oblast.

== Creativity ==
He painted landscapes and portraits, in which realism and impressionism can be traced. From 1926, he participated in exhibitions in Kosmach, Lviv, Warsaw, Lutsk, Rivne, and Kremenets.

He created a series of portraits of prominent figures in Ukrainian history and culture, and landscapes of Volyn, among which are:

- "Vyd na Lysu horu" (1929), "Yurii Lypa", "Pavlo Zaitsev" (both — 1930s), "Tserkva na Kozatskykh mohylakh kolo Berestechka", "Hutsulka", "Natiurmort", "Lirnyk", "Etyud", "Hirskyy potik", "Sosny v Berestechku" (all — 1930), "Mlyn u Pliashevii", "Tserkva u seli Soloniv bilia Berestechka", "Kraievyd z Volyni", "Tsvyntar", "Mlyn" (all — 1931), "Donechka" (1935), "Marko Bezruchko" (1938).

== Bibliography ==
- Dunaievskyi Dmytro Yosypovych / Y. O. Biriulov, R. M. Yatsiv // Encyclopedia of Modern Ukraine [Online] / Eds. : I. М. Dziuba, A. I. Zhukovsky, M. H. Zhelezniak [et al.] ; National Academy of Sciences of Ukraine, Shevchenko Scientific Society. – Kyiv : The NASU institute of Encyclopedic Research, 2008.
- L. Voloshyn (2024). "Дунаєвський Дмитро". Мистецька школа Олекси Новаківського 1923-1935. Життя у перспективі часу (in Ukrainian). Lviv–Drohobych: Kolo. p. 355. ISBN 978-617-642-676-9.
- "Дунаєвський Дмитро". Арт галерея.
