= St. Catherine's Academy =

Coordinates: 33.8357°N 117.9207°W

St. Catherine’s Academy
- Anaheim, California; United States

Information
- Type: Private; Catholic boarding & day school
- Religious affiliations: Roman Catholic, Dominican Sisters of Mission San Jose
- Established: 1889
- Head of school: Ms. Bridget Ronan
- Grades: TK-8
- Gender: Boys
- Student to teacher ratio: 17:1
- Campus: 9 acres (3.6 ha)
- Colors: Green and gold
- Athletics conference: Parochial Athletic League
- Mascot: Knights
- Affiliation: Dominican Order
- Former name: St. Catherine's Academy
- Website: http://www.stcatherinesacademy.org

St. Catherine’s Academy is a Catholic school with a military tradition located in Anaheim, California. It was founded in 1889 by The Dominican Sisters of Mission San José. The school offers an academic program for boys in transitional kindergarten (preschool) through eighth grade, as well as military structure and leadership training. The school is open to both resident and day students.

== History ==
St. Catherine’s Academy was founded by Mother Maria Pia Backes, O.P., one of the three foundresses of the Dominican Sisters of Mission San Jose. The school was dedicated on March 19, 1889 and opened on March 22nd as an academy for girls and a parochial school for local German families. In 1894, St. Catherine’s became an orphanage for up to 200 boys by 1903 before becoming an all-boys military school in the 1924. In 1925, the school acquired the status of "private military academy" with approval by Bishop John J. Cantwell. Despite suffering a major earthquake in 1933, a statue of St. Joseph remained standing and it currently resides in the indoor pool area today. In the 1950's, enrollment was expanding so the school opened its doors to day students. The name was changed to St. Catherine's Military School and later St. Catherine's Military Academy. In August 2007, the academy began using its original name: St. Catherine's Academy. The Dominican Sisters continue to be a presence on campus. Today, eleven sisters hold positions in administration, resident care and teaching while two military professionals lead the military program. The academy celebrated its 135th anniversary in 2024.

== Campus ==
St. Catherine’s Academy is a transitional kindergarten–8^{th} grade campus in Anaheim, California, approximately two miles (3 km) from Disneyland. Resident cadets stay in one of four dormitories.

The school’s chapel, the St. Thomas Aquinas Chapel, was completed in 1958. Decorated by the artist Jan Henryk de Rosen and equipped with a full-size organ, it is dedicated to the memory of Captain William Maguire, the cadets' chaplain in the 1950's. Maguire was a United States Navy Chaplain to the Pacific Fleet during World War II. He was at Pearl Harbor, preparing to celebrate mass when the Japanese attacked.

The campus features:

- three large classroom buildings
- robotics lab
- library
- learning resource center
- music building
- four dormitories
- infirmary
- indoor pool
- sports field
- indoor gymnasium
- obstacle course (3rd - 8th grade)
- recess and playground area (TK-2nd grade)

== Accreditations and memberships ==
- Western Association of Schools and Colleges (WASC)
- National Catholic Educational Association (NCEA)
- Catholic Boarding Schools Associations (CBSA)
- Association of Military Colleges and Schools of the United States (AMCSUS)
- International Boys' Schools Coalition (IBSC)

== Academics ==
St. Catherine’s academics adhere to the standards of both the State of California and the Diocese of Orange. The school also offers an English learning program for international students.

== Military tradition ==
The military program begins for students in second grade. Cadets participate in drill training each afternoon. The military department also teaches survival swimming, land navigation, leadership courses, and basic survival techniques.

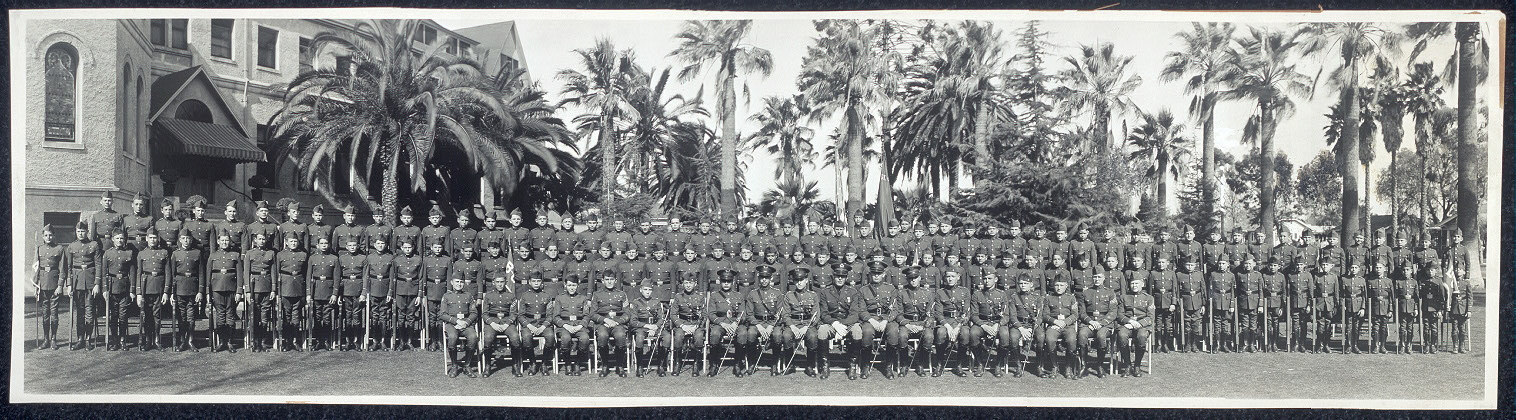
Class photo of cadets from the 1940's. Courtesy of the Library of Congress.

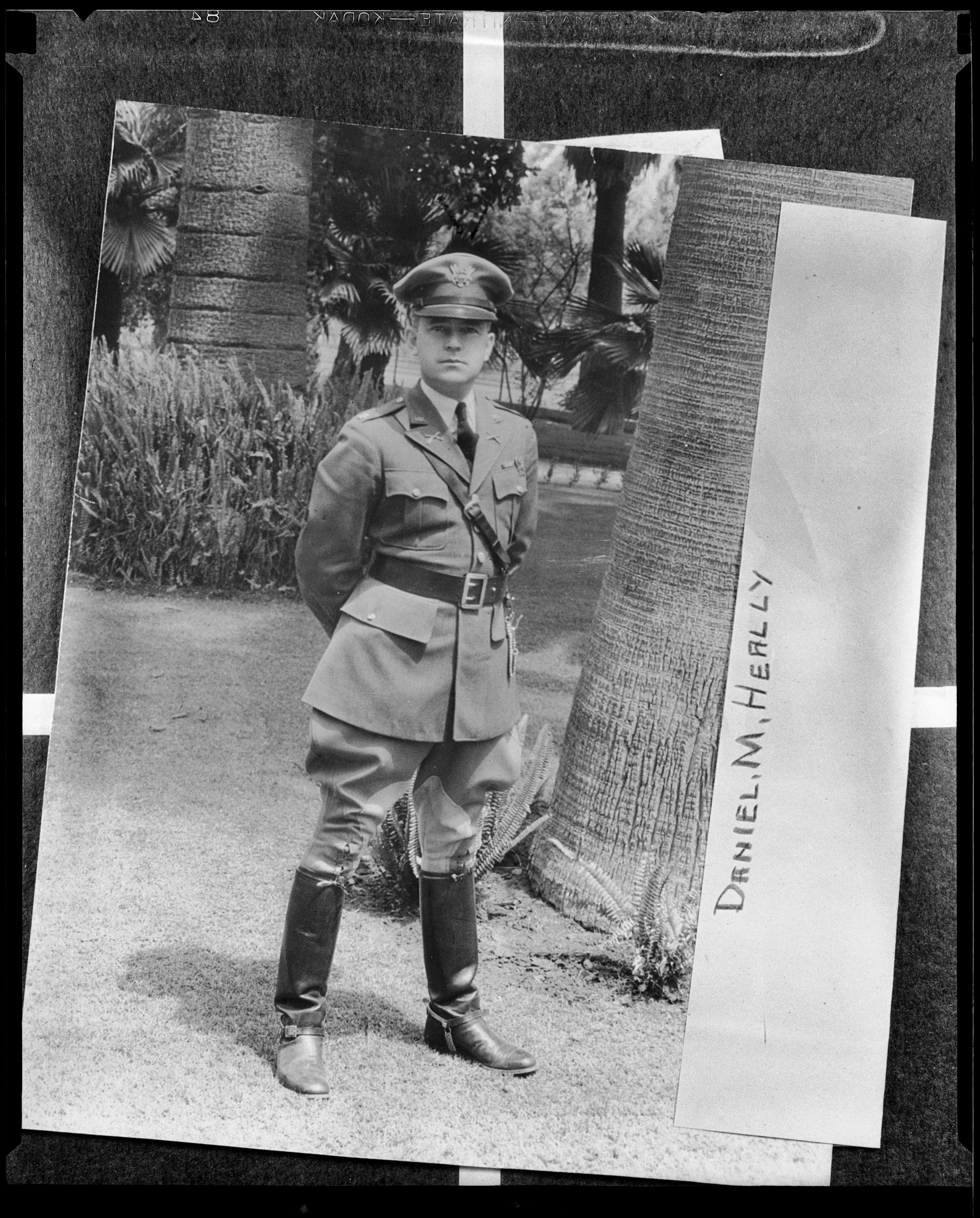
Captain Daniel M. Healy, circa 1935. Courtesy of the Los Angeles Times Photographic Collection.

Commandants of Cadets (in order) from 1934–present.

- Captain Daniel M. Healy, US Army
- Major Charles A. Schmitt, US Army
- Major Lawrence Zaborowski, US Army
- Commander Larry Lundin, US Coast Guard
- CWO5 Larry Muhlenforth, US Marine Corps
- Chief Dale Norton, US Navy
- Colonel Barry Bizzell, US Marine Corps
- Tyr May, US Marine Corps, current

Deputy Commandants

- Cmdr Howard Wiederholt
- Col Newman
- Lt Joe Buchanan
- Lt Col W.M. Haney
- Sgt L. Bowan
- Sgt Willens
- Col A Bacman
- Ryan Sepulveda
- Cpl Burke
- Cpl Jerry Heaps
- David Kim
- Christopher Heidel
- Capt Angel Ramos

== Extracurricular activities ==
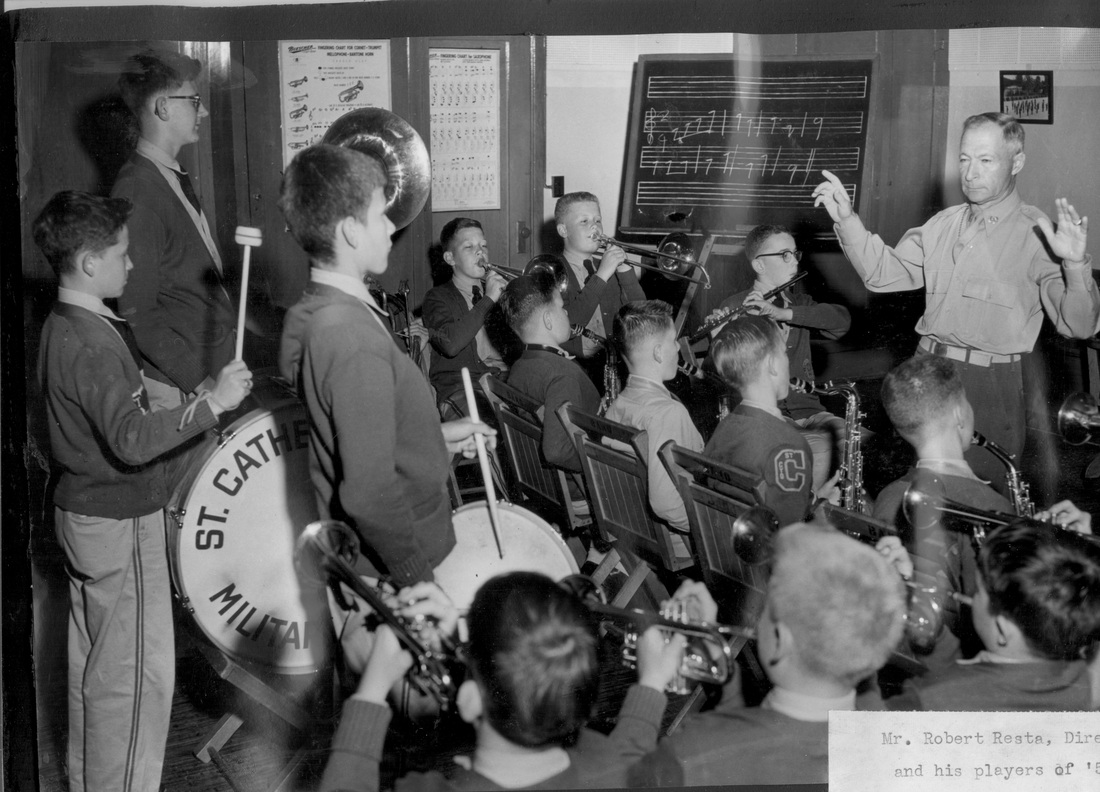
Mr. Robert Resta leads the band in rehearsal, circa 195-

St. Catherine’s competes in the Parochial Athletic League (PAL) in three sports: flag football, volleyball and basketball. The music program is among the oldest ongoing programs in Orange County, with over 70 years in existence. In addition to weekly music classes, students can take individual guitar and piano lessons. The school’s band, The Marching Knights, participates in local parades and concerts.

== Popular culture ==
St Catherine's Academy was used for most exterior shots in the 1955 movie The Private War of Major Benson, where cadets filled every role other than the principal speaking roles, including all of the extras.
