= Berestechko =

Town in Volyn Oblast, Ukraine

Berestechko Берестечко Beresteczko (in Polish)
- City
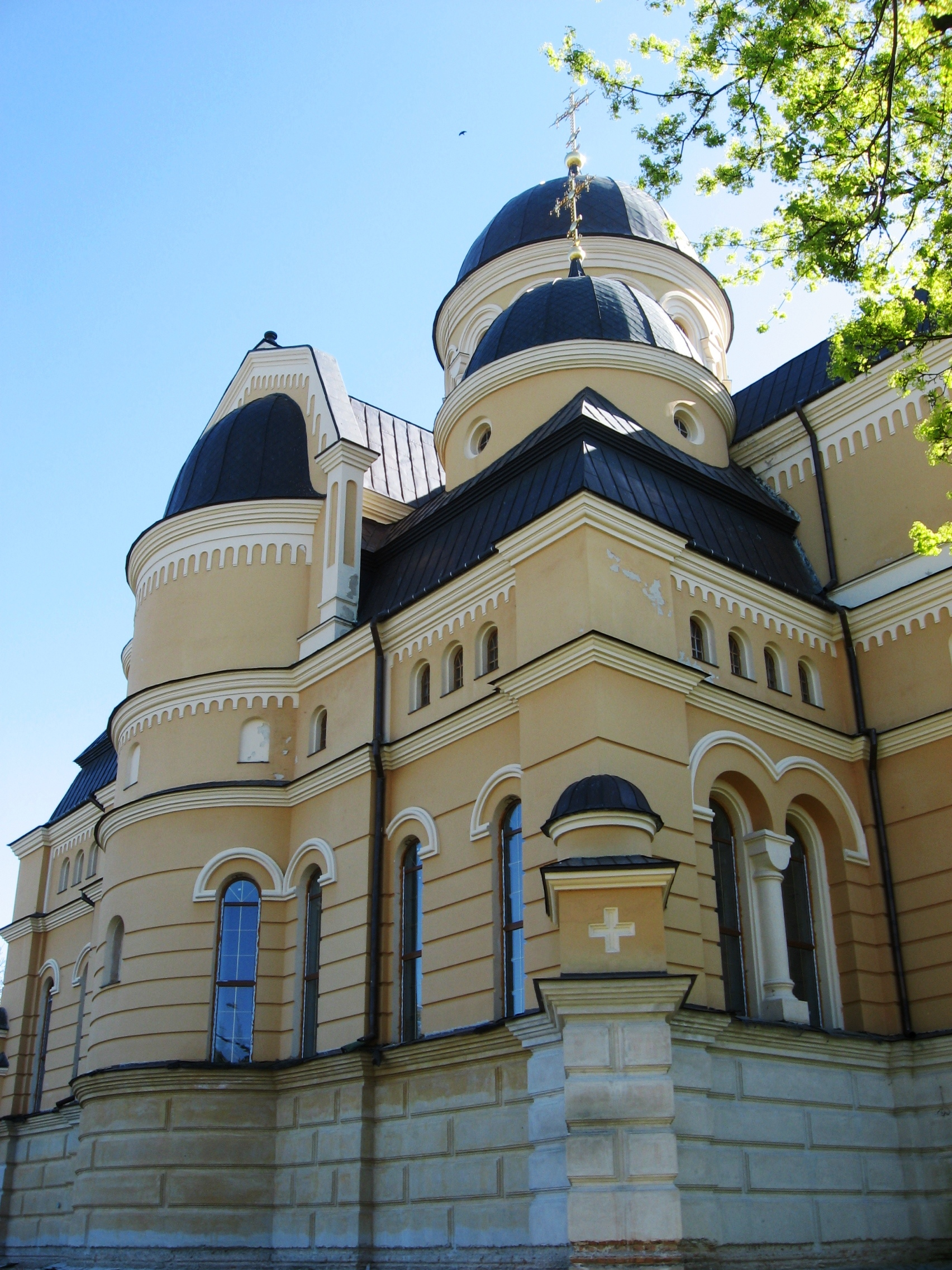
- Church of the Holy Trinity

- Flag Seal
- Interactive map of Berestechko
- Location within Volyn Oblast Location within Ukraine
- Coordinates: 50°21′00″N 25°07′00″E
- Country: Ukraine
- Oblast: Volyn Oblast
- Raion: Lutsk Raion
- Hromada: Berestechko urban hromada

Government
  - Mayor: Mykola Shotik

Population (2022)
  - Total: 1,630
- Website: http://berestechkivska.gromada.org.ua/

Berestechko (Ukrainian: Берестечко, IPA: [bereˈstɛtʃko]) is a small city in Lutsk Raion, Volyn Oblast, Ukraine. It is located on the Styr River. Population: 1,630 (2022 estimate).

== Geography ==
Berestechko is located in the southern part of Volhynia in the upper part of the Styr valley. The surrounding areas are rich with peat.

== History ==
Berestechko received Magdeburg rights in 1547. Around the same era, Socinian communities were active in the town. In 1651 the Battle of Berestechko during the Khmelnytsky Uprising took place near the settlement, in which the Polish–Lithuanian Commonwealth engaged in a battle with Zaporozhian Cossacks and Crimean Tatars. Owing to the loss of the Ukrainian Cossacks, the settlement remained under control of the Polish Royal House. Cossack graves and a church dedicated to the memory of the battle can still be found near the city.

Following the third partition of Poland in 1795, Berestechko become part of the Russian Empire. Until the Russian Revolution of 1917 it was part of Volhynian Governorate. Following the 1917 October Revolution in Russia, the city was an object of territorial conflicts between the empire's successor states. Following the Peace of Riga, from 1921 to 1939 Berestechko was part of Poland. In September 1939 it became part of the Union of Soviet Socialist Republics following the Soviet invasion of Poland, and became a town in January 1940.

The Germans occupied Berestechko (then part of the Reichskommissariat Ukraine) from 23 June 1941 to April 1944, during which they forced all Jews in the town to live in a ghetto, and eventually executed them in 1942. A witness to the execution in the town stated, "The Jews dug their own pits, accompanied by ten requisitioned Ukrainians. People climbed on trees to watch the execution in spite of the ban. The Germans shot them so that they fell down into the pit." Out of the six synagogues present in the town, only one of them remained standing following the Nazi occupation. During 1943 the town became a refuge for Poles fleeing the Volyn massacre, and the Germans formed a Schutzmannschaft with several Poles to help defend against the Ukrainian Insurgent Army (UPA). The town church was attacked by the UPA on 30 December 1943, but the UPA were pushed back. The Poles would eventually leave the town for other nations, or to be deported off to concentration camps. On 17 January 1944, the Germans left the town. UPA's resistance against the Bolsheviks in the area lasted until 1946.

After the end of the war, the town was rebuilt and in 1946 it was electrified. By 1950, a water mill, a sawmill and several schools were in operation, and by 1968 a brick factory, food processing plant, and zootechnical school were also established. As of 1989, the food industry remained the basis of the economy.

Following the dissolution of the Soviet Union the town became part of independent Ukraine.

== Demographics ==
=== Population development ===
Year	Population	Change (%)
1989	2,099	n/a
2001	1,904	−9.3
2005	1,870	−1.8
2013	1,752	−6.3
2020	1,694	−3.3
2021	1,634	−3.5

=== Ethnic groups and languages ===
As of the 2001 Ukrainian census, Berestechko had a population of 1,863 inhabitants. The ethnic and linguitic composition of the local population according to the census was as follows:

Ethnic groups in Berestechko
	percent
Ukrainians	97.23%
Russians	1.88%
others	0.89%

Native languages in Berestechko
	percent
Ukrainian	98.1%
Russian	1.5%
Belarusian	0.2%
Armenian	0.2%
Romanian	0.1%
others	0.1%

== Transport and Infrastructure ==
=== Transport ===
Berestechko is located 25 km southeast of the railway station Horokhiv, on the Lviv railway. The closest major roads are European route E40, Highway M19, and Highway H17, all approximately situated within 40 km of the town. A local bus operates here, offering connections with local towns and also a connection to Kyiv.

=== Education ===
Berestechko has a secondary school, a vocational school, a hospital, a psycho-neurological boarding school, a library, a house of culture, a cinema and a schoolboy's house. There is a music school on Naberezhna Street. It was previously a synagogue and the building is strictly protected by the state as a historical monument.

== Notable people ==
- Dmytro Dunaievskyi (1905–1944), Ukrainian painter and a participant in the national liberation struggle
- Lou Ferstadt (1900-1954), comics illustrator and muralist
- Ivan Yizhakevych (1864–1962): Realist painter, illustrator, and graphic artist, created frescoes for a local church.
