= Berestechko urban hromada =

Berestechko urban hromada Берестечківська міська громада
- Hromada
- Interactive map of Berestechko urban hromada
- Country: Ukraine
- Oblast: Volyn
- Raion: Lutsk
- Admin. center: Berestechko

Area
  - Total: 2,235 km^{2} (863 sq mi)

Population (2020)
  - Total: 9,456
  - Density: 4.231/km^{2} (10.96/sq mi)
- CATOTTG code: UA07080010000062933
- Settlements: 21
- Cities: 1
- Villages: 20

Berestechko urban territorial hromada (Ukrainian: Берестечківська міська територіальна громада) is one of the hromadas of Ukraine, located in Lutsk Raion in Volyn Oblast. Its administrative centre is the city of Berestechko.

The hromada has an area of 223.5 km^{2} (86.3 mi^{2}), as well as a population of 9,456 (as of 2020).

On July 19, 2020, as a result of the administrative-territorial reform and liquidation of the Horokhiv Raion, the community became part of the newly formed Lutsk Raion.

== Composition ==
In addition to one city (Berestechko), the hromada contains 20 villages:

- Antonivka
- Bohunivka
- Burkachi
- Dykovyny
- Hektary
- Horishnie
- Humnyshche
- Ivanivka
- Kolmiv
- Kutriv
- Lobachivka
- Lypa
- Merva
- Novostav
- Peremyl
- Pisky
- Smoliava
- Staryky, Volyn Oblast
- Volytsia-Lobachivska
- Zelene

== Starosta okruhs ==
- Lobachivka (Horishnie, Ivanivka, Kolmiv, Lobachivka, Novostav, Volytsia-Lobachivska)
- Peremyl (Bohunivka, Humnyshche, Lypa, Peremyl, Smoliava, Staryky, Zelene)
- Pisky (Antonivka, Burkachi, Dykovyny, Hektary, Kutriv, Merva Pisky)
