= Jan Henryk de Rosen =

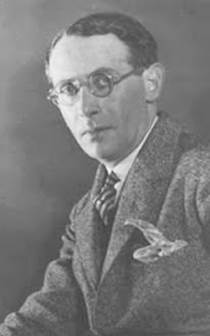
- Born: February 25, 1891; Warsaw, Russian Empire
- Died: August 22, 1982 (aged 91); Arlington, Virginia, U.S.

Jan Henryk de Rosen (February 25, 1891 – August 22, 1982) is best known as a Polish artist of murals and mosaics. He served in World War I in various capacities, rising to the rank of captain in the Polish Army and earning a range of military honors. De Rosen also served as a diplomat for Poland. He moved to the United States in 1939 where he continued to complete large-scale commissions for churches and other institutions. In America, De Rosen was a research professor of liturgical art at the Catholic University of America in Washington, D.C.

== Early life ==
Jan Henryk de Rosen was born in the Russian occupied (Partitions of Poland) Warsaw, Poland to the painter Jan Rosen and Wanda née Hantke, both scions of Polish Jewish families that had converted to Calvinism in the 19th century. Jan Henryk converted to Catholicism in 1903. His father was a Polish historical and genre painter, who amongst other activities worked as painter at the court of the last Czars of Russia, Alexander III and Nicholas II, but his work was mostly dedicated to the Polish historical military history (like other Polish painters Józef Brandt, Juliusz Kossak, Wojciech Kossak, Zygmunt Rozwadowski etc.) and is often used in history textbooks today.

Early in his childhood, De Rosen went to live with his two sisters, Maria and Zofia (she became a sculptor), in Paris, France, and it is said that he initially wrote poetry before deciding to devote himself to painting. During the First World War he first joined the French Army, 11th regiment of cuirassiers, fighting at the battles of Ypres and Somme, then he actively promoted the Polish forces in France known as the Blue Army and joined Polish Army. For his military services he was awarded Polish Virtuti Militari cross and Cross of Valour, French Legion of Honour and Croix de Guerre. De Rosen served as a translator at the Paris Peace Conference.

== Painting career ==
Until 1921, De Rosen studied painting in Warsaw and had his first major exhibition the same year, while working for the Polish Foreign Affairs ministry. In 1925 he had another major exhibition at Zachęta gallery in Warsaw, and upon seeing his religious work Armenian archbishop Józef Teodorowicz of Lwów asked him to paint the murals inside Lwów's restored Armenian Cathedral; he finished the work in 1929, along with another Polish artist Józef Mehoffer who painted the ceilings there.

After that major work, De Rosen continued with his religious art in Poland and abroad, among others he painted murals at the Kahlenberg's Chapel of Saint Joseph near Vienna, Austria, and at the request of Pius XI two murals at papal residence at Castel Gandolfo. During the 1930s, De Rosen taught at the Lwów Politechnic University (Lviv Polytechnic). De Rosen came to United States in 1939 at the request of the Polish ambassador count Jerzy Potocki to paint murals at the Polish embassy in Washington showing king Jan III Sobieski at Vienna. He also completed decorations for the Polish Pavilion at the World's Fair.

The outbreak of World War II, the German and Soviet occupation of Poland in 1939, and the communist takeover of Poland prompted De Rosen to stay in the United States. He later became a research professor of liturgical art at the Catholic University of America and a corresponding member of the Polish Institute of Arts and Sciences of America. He continued painting religious and other works of art throughout his later life while living in the United States, amongst others De Rosen painted a canvas of Saint Stanislaus of Szczepanów for Pope John Paul II.

Two of De Rosen's mosaics are among the largest in the world: one in the dome of the New Cathedral in St. Louis, Missouri and his Christ in Majesty mosaic in the dome of the Basilica of the National Shrine of the Immaculate Conception in Washington, D.C., which measures 3,610 square feet.

In 2018, a hidden mural by De Rosen was uncovered in Lviv's organ concert hall in the former Church of St. Mary Magdalene, Lviv.

== Work ==
Among his decorations and paintings are: chapel in the Theological Seminary of Lviv (1929–30), chapel of King Jan Sobieski at Kahlenberg near Vienna (1930); pictures in the art museums of Lviv, Lublin and Bydgoszcz.

Pope Pius XI commissioned De Rosen to paint murals in his private chapel at Castel Gandolfo. The painting at the Pope's summer residence made De Rosen the first painter to paint murals in the Pope's chapel since Michelangelo.

Other murals and mosaics created by de Rosen may be seen at

- The Washington National Cathedral in Washington, D.C., in the Chapel of St. Joseph of Arimathea
- The mural above the High Altar at Church of the Ascension and St. Agnes in Washington, D.C.
- The Shrine of the Immaculate Conception in Washington, D.C.
- St. Luke's Episcopal Church in Prescott, Arizona
- Grace Cathedral in San Francisco's Nob Hill district.
- The Purgatorial shrine in St. Wenceslaus Roman Catholic Church in Chicago.
- The lobby of the National Welfare Conference Building in Washington, D.C.
- St. Catherine's Military Academy Chapel in Anaheim, California

Other principal works by Jan Henryk de Rosen in the United States can be seen in Buffalo, Memphis, Pittsburgh, and in the California cities of La Jolla, Hollywood, Pasadena, Eagle Rock, Monterey Park, Vallejo and Sacramento. One of his greatest creations is hailed as the largest mosaic in the world, the dome of the New Cathedral in St. Louis, Missouri. Other works include Our Lady, Queen of the Most Holy Rosary Cathedral (Toledo, Ohio) and seven paintings in St Mary Church Edgerton Ohio.

Many of De Rosen's murals were in made wax tempera (a mixture of pigment and beeswax liquefied by alcohol) set in fields of gold leaf, on plaster. De Rosen is said to have used Dutch beer to liquify the wax.
