= Plastic Panorama of Old Lviv =

Plastic Panorama of Old Lviv (Polish: Panorama Plastyczna Dawnego Lwowa) is a model of the city of Lwów (since 1945 Lviv in Ukraine) as it looked like in mid-18th century, when it belonged to the Crown of the Kingdom of Poland. The model, with measurements of 4 by 3.6 meters and 1:200 scale, was made in the interbellum period under supervision of Polish architect and art historian, Janusz Witwicki.

The Panorama shows all buildings and streets that were found within city walls of the 18th century Lwów. It was made of Bristol board, lead, sheet copper and wire, and colored with paints and different acids. At first, Witwicki himself financed the project, some time in mid-1930s a foundation was created, which collected money for it. In the first half of 1939 authorities of Lwów decided to cover one-third of expenses, but by September 1, 1939 (see: Polish September Campaign) they gave Witwicki only 10,000 PLN. At the beginning of World War II, models of the largest building had already been made.

During Soviet (1939–1941) and German (1941–1944) occupations of the city, Witwicki worked on the model aided by some 20 persons. In addition, his atelier served as a hiding place for a few Jews. After the war, Soviet authorities prevented Witwicki from taking the Panorama with him to Poland. His documentation was confiscated, and is kept by the Ukrainian Academy of Sciences. On July 16, 1946, Witwicki died unexpectedly of unknown circumstances a day before his expulsion to post-Yalta Poland. It is suspected that he was murdered by the NKVD. After his death, his wife managed to take the Panorama to Warsaw, where it was secretly kept in the vaults of the National Museum by professor Stanislaw Lorentz.

With much help from friends of the Witwicki family and hierarchs of the Catholic Church, the Panorama was finally clandestinely transported to Wrocław, where many Polish inhabitants of Lwów settled after the war. After renovation, following 1989, it was featured in the Museum of Architecture in Wrocław, but since 2003 it has been housed in a vault.
