= Janusz Witwicki =

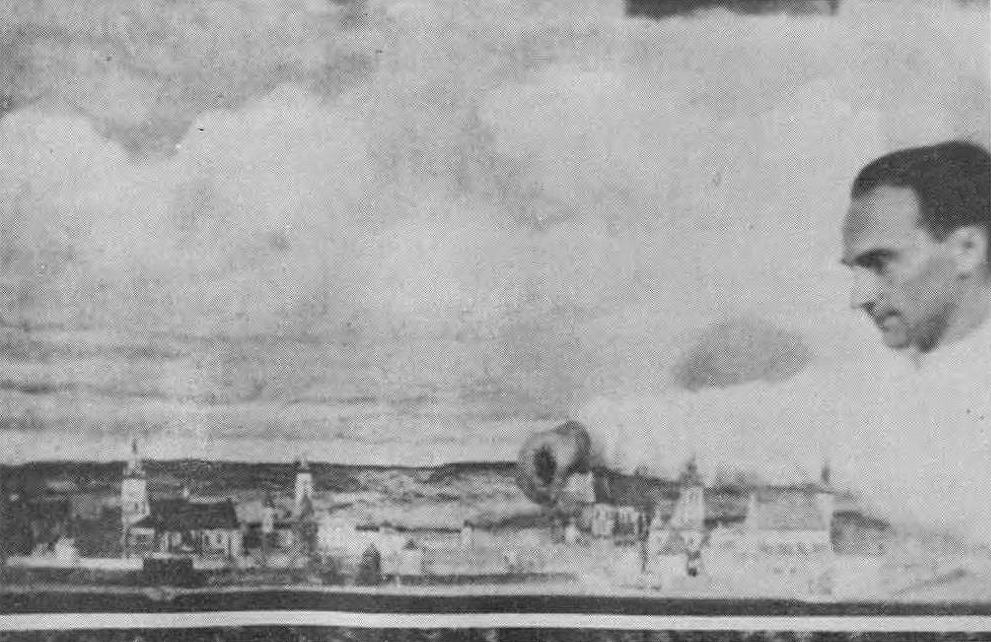
Janusz Witwicki during work

Janusz Witwicki (10 September 1903 in Lwów – 16 July 1946 also in Lwów) was a Polish architect and art historian, creator of the Plastic Panorama of Old Lviv.

He was the son of Władysław Witwicki – a psychologist, philosopher, translator, historian (of psychology and art), artist, and one of the fathers of Polish psychology.

Witwicki attended the VII Tadeusz Kościuszko High School in Lwów, and in 1920 he volunteered to the Polish Army, to take part in the Polish-Soviet War. After the conflict, he studied architecture at the Lwów Polytechnic, which he graduated in 1926. Also, he studied history of art at the University of Jan Kazimierz, with extra courses taken in Paris and Rome.

Witwicki had his own office, he designed city of Lwów's pavilion for the 1929 Poznań International Fair. In the same year, Witwicki started working on the deed of his life - the Plastic Panorama of Old Lviv. For a few years, in the early 1930s, he moved to Toruń, and then returned to Lwów, to take up the job of assistant at the Historical Architecture Department at the Lwów Polytechnic.

During World War II, Witwicki continued his work on the Panorama, he was three times arrested by both Soviet and German occupiers. He was murdered by unknown perpetrators (possibly NKVD agents) on July 16, 1946. Witwicki was buried at the Lychakivskiy Cemetery.

The book Lviv through the ages (2003) by Ihor Kaczor and Love Kaczor includes a dedication to Witwicki.

== Sources ==
- Witwicki, Michał. "Janusz Witwicki 1903-1946. Panorama plastyczna dawnego Lwowa". Mój Lwów (in Polish).
