= Yurii Biriuliov =

Ukrainian art historian (born 1952)

- Юрій Олександрович Бірюльов
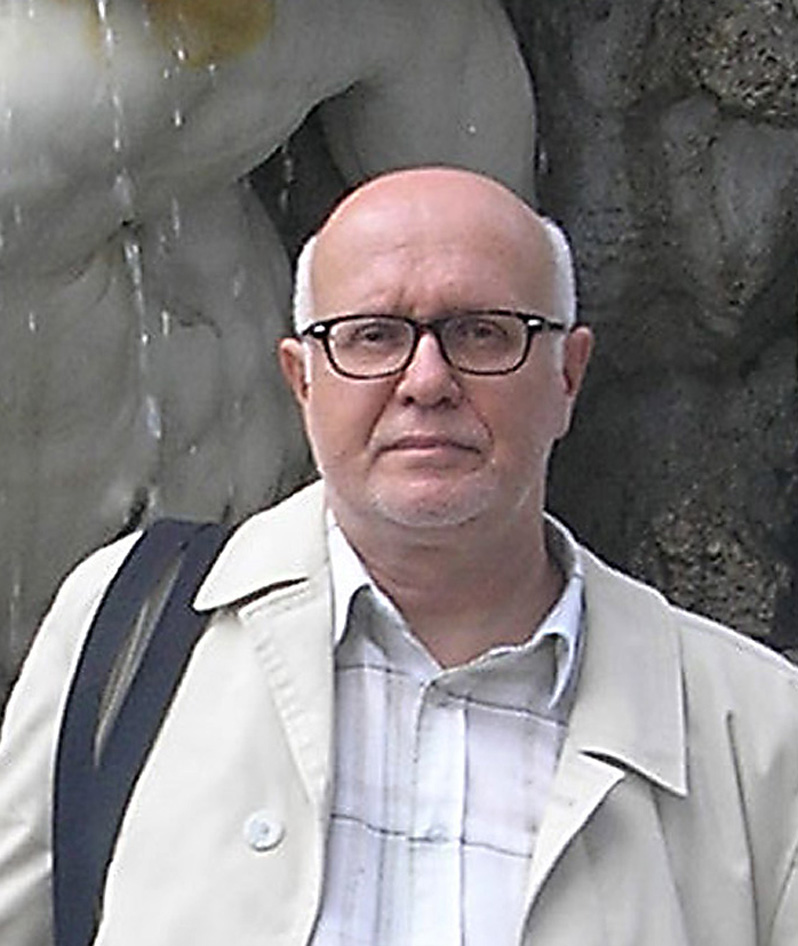
- Born: 21 August 1952 (age 74); Sofia, Bulgaria
- Education: University of Lviv
- Occupation: Art historian

Yurii Biriuliov (Ukrainian: Юрій Олександрович Бірюльов; born 21 August 1952) is a Ukrainian art historian. He became a Candidate of Arts in 1986 and a member of the National Union of Artists of Ukraine in 1989.

== Biography ==
Yurii Biriuliov was born on 21 August 1952, in Sofia, Bulgaria.

He graduated from Lviv University in 1975. From 1978 to 1987, he was a senior research fellow at the Lviv Art Gallery. In 1987, he started teaching at the Lviv Polytechnic; and from 1997, he has also been the chief scientific editor of the "Tsentr Yevropy" publishing house in Lviv.

He is an organizer of art exhibitions, including "Lviv Secession" (Lviv Art Gallery, 1986) and "General National Exhibition in Lviv" (International Cultural Centre in Kraków, 1994).

From 1994, he has been a co-editor and author for the Lviv historical and cultural journal "Halytska Brama". His academic specialization is the architecture and fine arts of Lviv and other Western Ukrainian cities from the late 19th to the early 20th century. His main contribution is the monograph "Secesja we Lwowie" (1996), where he systematically researched how Art Nouveau was formed in Lviv's art and how various artistic movements were combined within it. In addition, he helped popularize Lviv by compiling the guidebooks "Lwów: Ilustrowany przewodnik" (2001) and "Get acquainted with Lviv" (2001). He is also a contributor to the Encyclopedia of Modern Ukraine.

== Bibliography ==
- Станкевич М. 60-літній ювілей Юрія Бірюльова // Мистецтвознавство'12. — Л., 2012. — С. 311.
