= Church of St. Mary Magdalene, Lviv =

Roman Catholic church in Lviv, Ukraine

Coordinates: 49°50′6″N 24°1′5″E

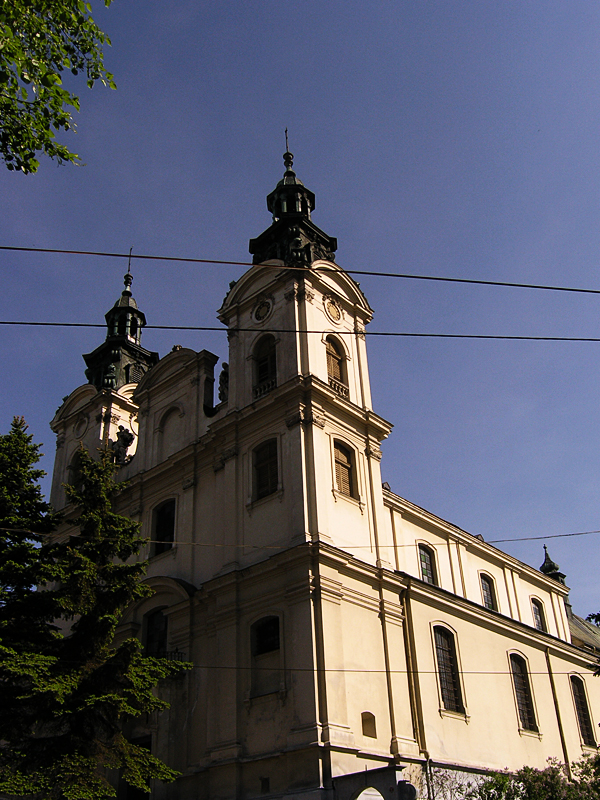
The Roman Catholic church of St. Mary Magdalene

The Roman Catholic church of St. Mary Magdalene in Lviv, Ukraine, is located west of the city's Old Town, near the Lviv Polytechnic University.

== History ==
The church was built at the beginning of the 17th century for the Dominican Order, combining the styles of Renaissance and Baroque, and consecrated in 1630. The church and monastery were plundered and burned in 1704 by Swedes. From 1753-1758 the architect Martin Urbank set about renovating the central tower, while later Sebastian Fesinger would add a decorative facade with rococo sculptures of Saint Dominic and Saint Hyacinth. These sculptures are situated between the pediment and the tower and were added to the preserved polygonal apse including an altarpiece presenting scenes from the life of Saint Mary Magdalene in stucco.

After the suppression of the Dominican monastery by the Austrian emperor Joseph II in 1783, its building was used as a women's prison until 1922 and the church was transferred to the diocese. The church underwent subsequent minor changes, with the groundwork carried out in front of it in 1880 necessitating the addition of stairs and a balcony; in 1889 Neo-Baroque tower-helmets were installed along with a clock on the southern tower.

In 1923 the monastery building was given to the Lviv Polytechnic, and in 1927 conservation work was carried out in the complex which continued until the outbreak of World War II. This work included the installation of an organ produced by the Czech Brothers Rieger workshop.

Under Soviet rule the church remained open longer than most others in Lviv, operating until it was closed in 1962. Most of the interior was plundered or destroyed after this, including the side altars, sculptures, and ambo, with only the organ and altar surviving today. In 1969 the church building was assigned to the Lviv Philharmony, which established an organ concert hall in it.

== Lviv Organ Hall ==
Lviv Organ Hall
- Львівський органний зал
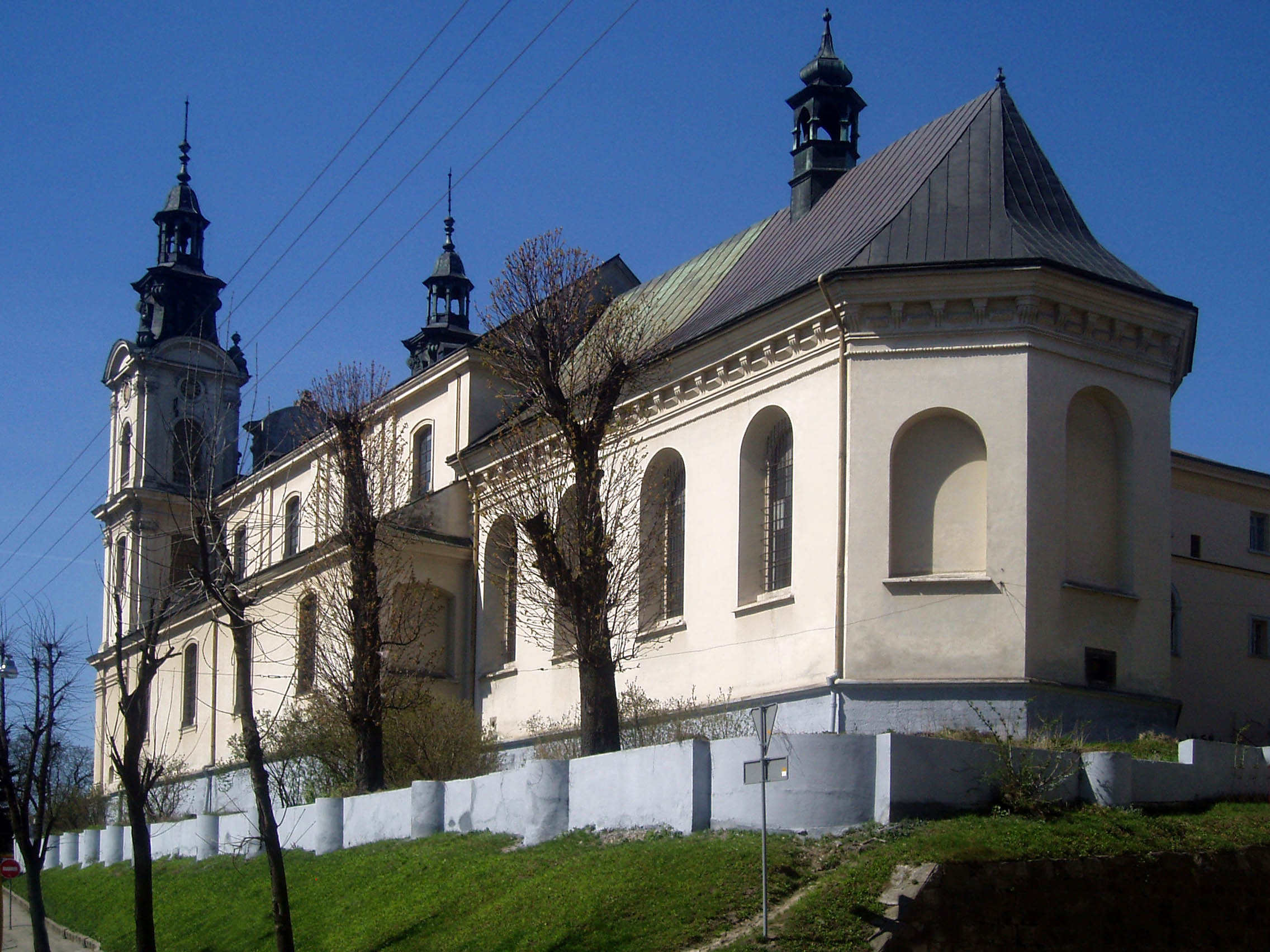
- View of the Organ Hall portion of the Church of St. Mary Magdalene
- Alternative names: Lviv House of Organ and Chamber Music

General information
- Location: 8 Bandera Street, Lviv, Ukraine
- Opened: 1988

The Lviv Organ Hall (Ukrainian: Львівський органний зал) is a concert hall located within the church. It is home to one of the largest organs in Ukraine, and hosts concerts of organ, symphonic, and chamber music. It is roughly 800 square meters in size and can hold up to 350 people, hosting roughly thirty performances each month.

The Rieger–Kloss styled organ installed within the concert hall was commissioned by Gebrüder Rieger in 1932 and was installed in 1933. During the Soviet period, the concert hall served a variety of purposes, including as a sports hall and dance hall. Until the 1960s, the space was owned by the Polytechnic Institute, but was repurposed by the Lviv Conservatory into the organ hall, a purpose which it retains to this day.

As an official concert organization, the Lviv House of Organ and Chamber Music was established in 1988.

=== Organ ===
The organ consists of 77 registers, 5 of which are transmission. It has four manuals each with a single pedal. All of the first, second, and third manuals are located on the choir balcony on a specially built concrete platform, while the fourth manual was placed above the sacristy. There are two consoles: one in the choir balcony and one in the chancel.

In 1969, the organ was partially refurbished and reorganized by Gebrüder Rieger. Primarily, the main console was replaced with a three manual version and was situated on a stage. Additionally, the pipes of the organ were restored, with new ones replacing old pipes, and the membranes in the tone channels and relay chambers were replaced.

=== Pictures ===
Lviv Organ Hall
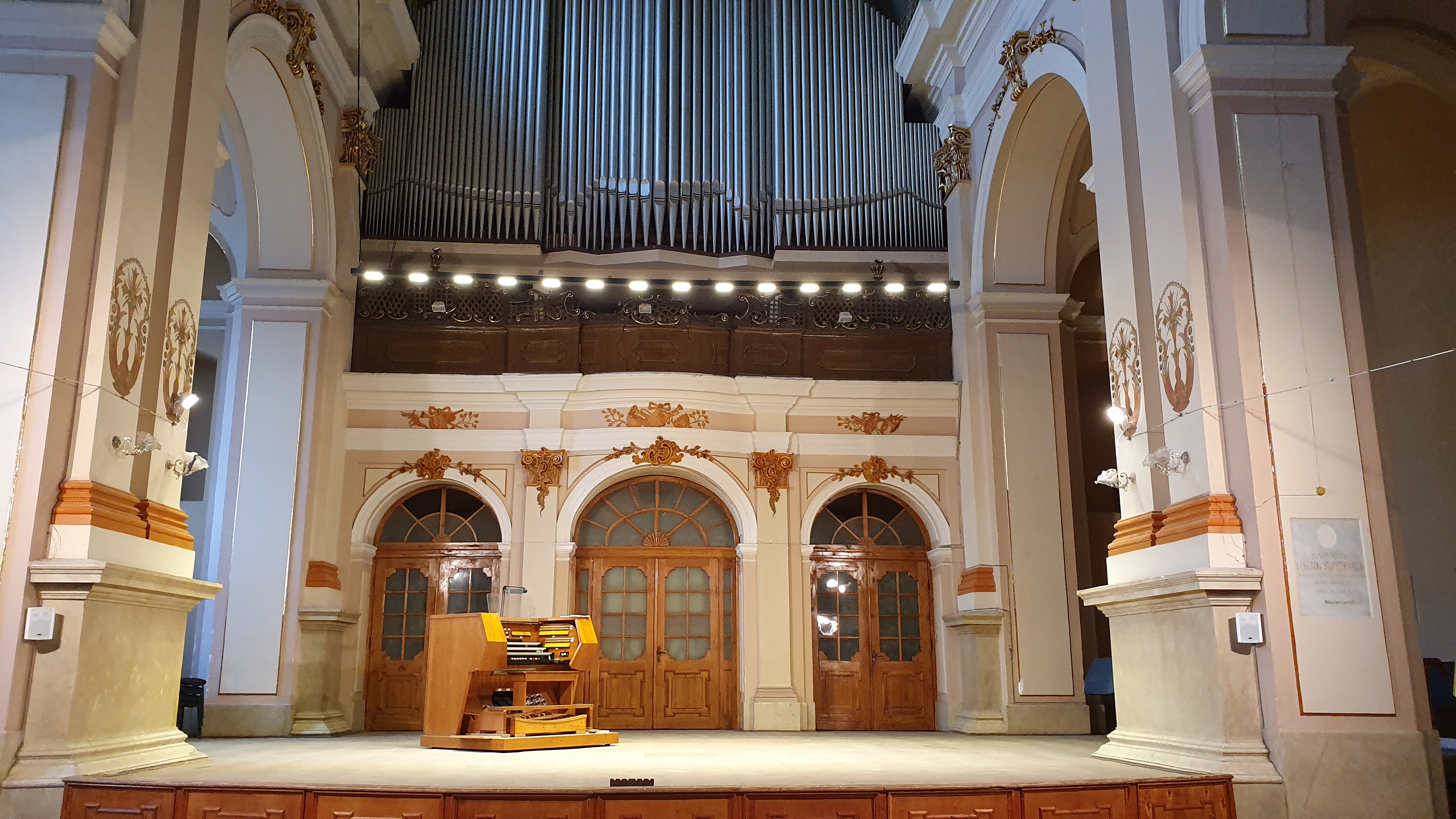
Interior-frontal view of Hall

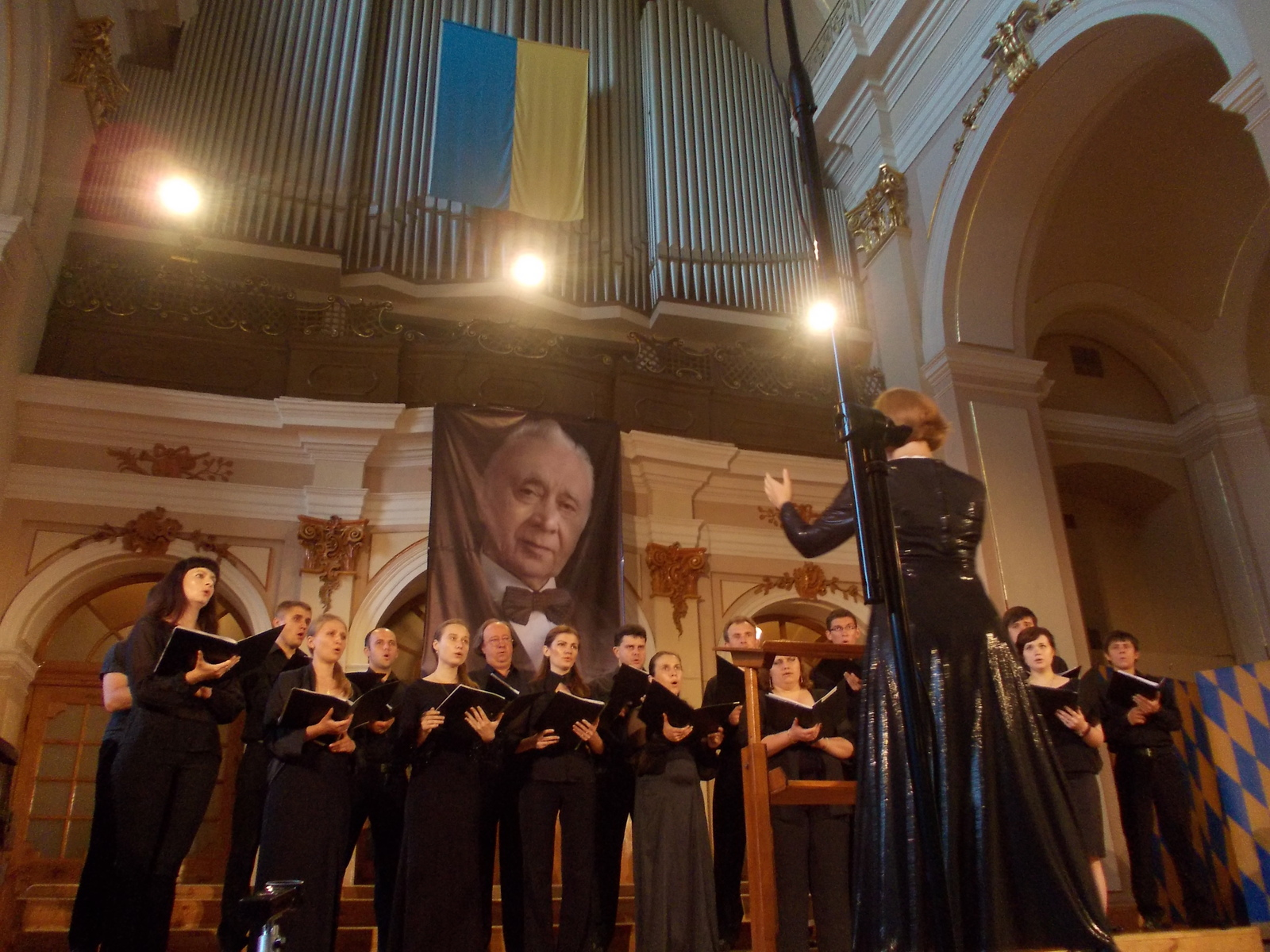
Leopolis A cappella choir singing in concert

== Modern parish ==
The parish was officially re-established in 1991 with the collapse of the Soviet Union. However, the church has not yet been returned, and at the moment remains the property of the state from which the faithful have to rent it to attend the Holy Mass.

== Mural ==
During renovation in the 2020s, a mural by Jan Henryk de Rosen was found within the church's organ hall, leading to its preservation.
