= Lawn (disambiguation) =

A lawn is an area of land planted with grass and sometimes clover and other plants, which are maintained at a low, even height.

Lawn may also refer to:

== Places ==
- Lawn, Newfoundland and Labrador, Canada, a town
- Lawn, Pennsylvania, United States, an unincorporated community
- Lawn, Texas, United States, a town
- Lawn, West Virginia, United States, an unincorporated community
- Lawn Lake, Colorado, United States, site of the Lawn Lake Dam failure

== Buildings ==
- The Lawn (Harlow), the first residential tower block built in the UK
- The Lawn, Lincoln, a grade II listed building in Lincoln, England
- The Lawn (Elkridge, Maryland), United States, a home on the National Register of Historic Places
- The Lawn (Nokesville, Virginia), United States, a home on the National Register of Historic Places

== Other uses ==
- Lawn cloth, a plain weave textile
- Lawn (surname)
- The Lawn Ground, a former football ground in Nailsworth, Gloucestershire, England
- The Lawn (cricket ground), Waringstown, County Down, Northern Ireland
- The Lawn, a court at the University of Virginia in the United States
- "Lawn", a song by Aldous Harding from the album Warm Chris
- LAWN, a wireless LAN (local area wireless network)

== See also ==
- Lawns (disambiguation)
- Bacterial lawn, a concept in microbiology
