= Todes =

Todes may refer to:

- Todes, Russian dance troupe established by Alla Duhova
- Samuel Todes (1927–1994), American philosopher

== See also ==
- Gender neutrality in languages with grammatical gender
- Tode (disambiguation)
