= Eugénie Ginsberg =

Polish philosopher and psychologist

- Born: 1905
- Died: 1942 (aged 36–37)
- Spouse: Leopold Blaustein

Philosophical work
- School: Lvov-Warsaw School
- Notable works: On the Concepts of Existential Dependence and Independence (1931)

Eugénie Ginsberg or Eugénie Ginsberg-Blaustein (1905-1944) was a Polish philosopher and psychologist noted for her works on descriptive psychology and her analysis of existential dependence, independence, and related concepts as applied in the area of psychology.

Ginsberg was the wife of the Polish psychologist Leopold Blaustein. She studied under the prominent Polish philosopher and logician Kazimierz Twardowski and was a member of the Lvov-Warsaw School.

== Background ==
Ginsberg was one of the few women who studied under Twardowski and was part of the second generation of the Twardowski School along with Janina Hosassion-Lindenbaum, Izydora Dąmbska, and Maria Kokoszyńska-Lutmanowa, among others. In 1927, she finished her doctoral dissertation on the concepts of existential dependence and independence. She was also one of the women appointees when Twardowski established the Lvov-Warsaw School.

Ginsberg and Blaustein were married on June 30, 1930. Due to their race as Polish Jews, Ginsberg, her husband, and son were killed by the Nazis at the Lvov ghetto.

== Works ==
Ginsberg's dissertation, On the Concepts of Existential Dependence and Independence, was published in 1931 during the anniversary of the Polish Philosophical Society. Several years later, Barry Smith would include an English translation of this publication in a collection of works on logic and formal ontology called Parts and Moments: Studies in Logic and Formal Ontology. This is her only surviving work.

Like her husband, Ginsberg also wrote several works in response to Edmund Husserl's theories. For instance, she sought to disprove the validity of some of Husserlian theories through her investigations on dependency. In the paper, Zur Husserlschen Lehre von den Ganzen und den Teilen (On Husserl's Theory of Wholes and Parts), Ginsberg discussed six of Husserl's theories. She offered proofs to theorems 1 and 3, validated theorem 5, but countered the three others. She also developed theories on descriptive psychology based on Husserlian thought.

Ginsberg also participated in Roman Ingarden's attempt to establish a phenomenological circle at Lvov. This group's work mainly focused on aesthetics and descriptive psychology. Later, her ideas on existential dependence and other connected concepts have been applied by other theorists in the field of psychology.
