= Truth-bearer =

Entities that are said to be either true or false

A truth-bearer is an entity that is said to be either true or false and nothing else. The thesis that some things are true while others are false has led to different theories about the nature of these entities. Since there is divergence of opinion on the matter, the term truth-bearer is used to be neutral among the various theories. Truth-bearer candidates include propositions, sentences, sentence-tokens, statements, beliefs, thoughts, intuitions, utterances, and judgements but different authors exclude one or more of these, deny their existence, argue that they are true only in a derivative sense, assert or assume that the terms are synonymous, or seek to avoid addressing their distinction or do not clarify it.

== Introduction ==
Some distinctions and terminology as used in this article, based on Wolfram 1989 (Chapter 2 Section1) follow. It should be understood that the terminology described is not always used in the ways set out, and it is introduced solely for the purposes of discussion in this article. Use is made of the type–token and use–mention distinctions. Reflection on occurrences of numerals might be helpful. In grammar a sentence can be a declaration, an explanation, a question, a command. In logic a declarative sentence is considered to be a sentence that can be used to communicate truth. Some sentences which are grammatically declarative are not logically so.

A character (Note: Character A character is a typographic character (printed or written), a unit of speech, a phoneme, a series of dots and dashes (as sounds, magnetic pulses, printed or written), a flag or stick held at a certain angle, a gesture, a sign as use in sign language, a pattern or raised indentations (as in brail) etc. in other words the sort of things that are commonly described as the elements of an alphabet.) is a typographic character (printed or written) etc.

A word-token (Note: Word-token A word-token is a pattern of characters. The pattern of characters A This toucan can catch a can contains six word-tokens The pattern of characters D He is grnd contains three word-tokens) is a pattern of characters. A word-type (Note: Word-type A word-type is an identical pattern of characters, . The pattern of characters A: This toucan can catch a can. contains five word-types (the word-token can occurring twice)) is an identical pattern of characters. A meaningful-word-token (Note: Meaningful-word-token A meaningful-word-token is a meaningful word-token. grnd in D He is grnd. is not meaningful.) is a meaningful pattern of characters. Two word-tokens which mean the same are of the same word-meaning (Note: Word-meaning Two word-tokens which mean the same are of the same word-meaning. Only those word-tokens which are meaningful-word-tokens can have the same meaning as another word-token. The pattern of characters A: This toucan can catch a can. contains six word-meanings. Although it contains only five word-types, the two occurrences of the word-token can have different meanings. On the assumption that bucket and pail mean the same, the pattern of characters B: If you have a bucket, then you have a pail contains ten word-tokens, seven word-types, and six word-meanings.)

A sentence-token (Note: Sentence-token A sentence-token is a pattern of word-tokens. The pattern of characters D: He is grnd is a sentence-token because grnd is a word-token (albeit not a meaningful word-token.)) is a pattern of word-tokens. A meaningful-sentence-token (Note: Meaningful-sentence-token A meaningful-sentence-token is a meaningful sentence-token or a meaningful pattern of meaningful-word-tokens. The pattern of characters D: He is grnd is not a sentence-token because grnd is not a meaningful word-token.) is a meaningful sentence-token or a meaningful pattern of meaningful-word-tokens. Two sentence-tokens are of the same sentence-type if they are identical patterns of word-tokens characters (Note: Sentence-type Two sentence-tokens are of the same sentence-type if they are identical patterns of word-tokens characters, e.g. the sentence-tokens P: I'm Spartacus and Q: I'm Spartacus are of the same sentence-type.) A declarative-sentence-token is a sentence-token which that can be used to communicate truth or convey information. (Note: Declarative-sentence-token A declarative-sentence-token is a sentence-token which that can be used to communicate truth or convey information. The pattern of characters E: Are you happy? is not a declarative-sentence-token because it interrogative not declarative.) A meaningful-declarative-sentence-token is a meaningful declarative-sentence-token (Note: Meaningful-declarative-sentence-tokens A meaningful-declarative-sentence-token is a meaningful declarative-sentence-token. The pattern of characters F: Cats blows the wind is not a meaningful-declarative-sentence-token because it is grammatically ill-formed The pattern of characters G: This stone is thinking about Vienna is not a meaningful-declarative-sentence-token because thinking cannot be predicated of a stone The pattern of characters H: This circle is square is not a meaningful-declarative-sentence-token because it is internally inconsistent The pattern of characters D: He is grnd is not a meaningful-declarative-sentence-token because it contains a word-token (grnd) which is not a meaningful-word-token) Two meaningful-declarative-sentence-tokens are of the same meaningful-declarative-sentence-type (Note: Meaningful-declarative-sentence-types Two meaningful-declarative-sentence-tokens are of the same meaningful-declarative-sentence-type if they are identical patterns of word-tokens characters, e.g. the sentence-tokens P: I'm Spartacus and Q: I'm Spartacus are of the same meaningful-declarative-sentence-type. In other words a sentence-type is a meaningful-declarative-sentence-type if all tokens of which are meaningful-declarative-sentence-tokens) if they are identical patterns of word-tokens. A nonsense-declarative-sentence-token (Note: Nonsense-declarative-sentence-token A nonsense-declarative-sentence-token is a declarative-sentence-token which is not a meaningful-declarative-sentence-token. The patterns of characters F: Cats blows the wind, G: This stone is thinking about Vienna and H: This circle is square are nonsense-declarative-sentence-tokens because they are declarative-sentence-tokens but not meaningful-declarative-sentence-tokens. The pattern of characters D: He is grnd is not a nonsense-declarative-sentence-token because it is not a declarative-sentence-token because it contains a word-token (grnd) which is not a meaningful-word-token.) is a declarative-sentence-token which is not a meaningful-declarative-sentence-token. A meaningful-declarative-sentence-token-use (Note: Meaningful-declarative-sentence-token-use A meaningful-declarative-sentence-token-use occurs when and only when a meaningful-declarative-sentence-token is used declaratively, rather than, say, mentioned. The pattern of characters T: Spartacus did not eat all his spinach in London on Feb 11th 2009 is a meaningful-declarative-sentence-token but, in all probability, it has never been used declaratively and thus there have been no meaningful-declarative-sentence-token-uses of T. A meaningful-declarative-sentence-token can be used zero to many times. Two meaningful-declarative-sentence-tokens-uses of the same meaningful-declarative-sentence-type are identical if and only if they are identical events in time and space with identical users.) occurs when and only when a meaningful-declarative-sentence-token is used declaratively.

A referring-expression (Note: Referring-expression An expression that can be used to pick out or refer to particular entity, such as definite descriptions and proper names) is expression that can be used to pick out or refer to particular entity. A referential success (Note: Referential success a referring-expression’s success in identifying a particular entity OR a meaningful-declarative-sentence-token-use’s containing one or more referring-expression all of which succeed in identifying a particular entity) is a referring-expression's success in identifying a particular entity. A referential failure (Note: Referential failure a referring-expression’s failure to identify a particular entity is referentially successful OR a meaningful-declarative-sentence-token-use’s containing one or more referring-expression that fail to identify a particular entity.) is a referring-expression's failure to identify a particular entity. A referentially-successful-meaningful-declarative-sentence-token-use (Note: Referentially-successful-meaningful-declarative-sentence-token-use A meaningful-declarative-sentence-token-use containing no referring-expression that fails to identify a particular entity. A use of a token of the meaningful-declarative-sentence-type U: The King of France is bald is a referentially-successful-meaningful-declarative-sentence-token-use if (and only if) the embedded referring-expression ‘The King of France’ is referentially successful. No use of a token of the meaningful-declarative-sentence-type V: The highest prime has no factors other than itself and 1 is not a referentially-successful-meaningful-declarative-sentence-token-use since the embedded referring-expression The highest prime is always a referential failure.) is a meaningful-declarative-sentence-token-use containing no referring-expression that fails to identify a particular entity.

== Sentences in natural languages ==
As Aristotle pointed out, since some sentences are questions, commands, or meaningless, not all can be truth-bearers. If in the proposal "What makes the sentence Snow is white true is the fact that snow is white" it is assumed that sentences like Snow is white are truth-bearers, then it would be more clearly stated as "What makes the meaningful-declarative-sentence Snow is white true is the fact that snow is white".

Theory 1a:

All and only meaningful-declarative-sentence-types (Note: Meaningful-declarative-sentence-types; Two meaningful-declarative-sentence-tokens are of the same meaningful-declarative-sentence-type if they are identical patterns of word-tokens characters, e.g. the sentence-tokens P and Q above are of the same meaningful-declarative-sentence-type. In other words a sentence-type is a meaningful-declarative-sentence-type if its tokens of are meaningful-declarative-sentence-tokens) are truth-bearers

Criticisms of theory 1a

Some meaningful-declarative-sentence-types will be both truth and false, contrary to our definition of truth-bearer, for example, (i) in liar-paradox sentences such as "This sentence is false", (see Fisher 2008) (ii) and in time, place, and person-dependent sentences such as "It is noon", "This is London", and "I'm Spartacus".

Anyone may ..ascribe truth and falsity to the deterministic propositional signs we here call utterances. But if he takes this line, he must, like Leibniz, recognise that truth cannot be an affair solely of actual utterances, since it makes sense to talk of the discovery of previously un-formulated truths. (Kneale, W&M (1962))

Revision to Theory 1a, by making a distinction between type and token.

To escape the time, place and person dependent criticism the theory can be revised, making use or the type–token distinction, as follows

Theory 1b:

All and only meaningful-declarative-sentence-tokens are truth-bearers

Quine argued that the primary truth-bearers are utterances (Note: Utterance: The term utterance is frequently used to mean meaningful-declarative-sentence-token. See e.g. Grice, Meaning, 1957 http://semantics.uchicago.edu/kennedy/classes/f09/semprag1/grice57.pdf)

Having now recognised in a general way that what are true are sentences, we must turn to certain refinements. What are best seen as primarily true or false are not sentences but events of utterances. If a man utters the words 'It is raining' in the rain, or the words 'I am hungry' while hungry, his verbal performance counts as true. Obviously one utterance of a sentence may be true and another utterance of the same sentence be false.

Source: Quine 1970, page 13

Criticisms of theory 1b

(i) Theory 1b prevents sentences which are meaningful-declarative-sentence-types from being truth-bearers. If all meaningful-declarative-sentence-types typographically identical to "The whole is greater than the part" are true then it surely follows that the meaningful-declarative-sentence-type "The whole is greater than the part" is true (just as all meaningful-declarative-sentence-tokens typographically identical to "The whole is greater than the part" are English entails the meaningful-declarative-sentence-types "The whole is greater than the part" is English) (ii) Some meaningful-declarative-sentences-tokens will be both truth and false, or neither, contrary to our definition of truth-bearer. E.g. A token, t, of the meaningful-declarative-sentence-type ‘P: I'm Spartacus’, written on a placard. The token t would be true when used by Spartacus, false when used by Bertrand Russell, neither true nor false when mentioned by Spartacus or when being neither used nor mentioned.

Theory 1b.1

All meaningful-declarative-sentence-token-uses are truth-bearers; some meaningful-declarative-sentence-types are truth-bearers

To allow that at least some meaningful-declarative-sentence-types can be truth-bearers, Quine allowed so-called "eternal sentences" (Note: Eternal Sentence: A sentence that stays forever true, or forever false, independently of any special circumstances under which they happen to be uttered or written. More exactly, a meaningful-declarative-sentence-type whose tokens have the same truth values. E.g. The whole is greater than the part is an eternal sentence, It is raining is not an eternal sentence but It rains in Boston, Mass., on July 15, 1968 is an eternal sentence) to be truth-bearers.

In Peirces's terminology, utterances and inscriptions are tokens of the sentence or other linguistic expression concerned; and this linguistic expression is the type of those utterances and inscriptions. In Frege's terminology, truth and falsity are the two truth values. Succinctly then, an eternal sentence is a sentence whose tokens have the same truth values.... What are best regarded as true and false are not propositions but sentence tokens, or sentences if they are eternal

Quine 1970 pages 13–14

Theory 1c

All and only meaningful-declarative-sentence-token-uses are truth-bearers

Arguments for theory 1c

By respecting the use–mention distinction, Theory 1c avoids criticism (ii) of Theory 1b.

Criticisms of theory 1c

(i) Theory 1c does not avoid criticism (i) of Theory 1b. (ii) meaningful-declarative-sentence-token-uses are events (located in particular positions in time and space) and entail a user. This implies that (a) nothing (no truth-bearer) exists and hence nothing (no truth-bearer) is true (or false) anytime anywhere (b) nothing (no truth-bearer) exists and hence nothing (no truth-bearer) is true (or false) in the absence of a user. This implies that (a) nothing was true before the evolution of users capable of using meaningful-declarative-sentence-tokens and (b) nothing is true (or false) except when being used (asserted) by a user. Intuitively the truth (or falsity) of ‘The tree continues to be in the quad’ continues in the absence of an agent to asset it.

Referential Failure A problem of some antiquity is the status of sentences such as U: The King of France is bald V: The highest prime has no factors W: Pegasus did not exist Such sentences purport to refer to entitles which do not exist (or do not always exist). They are said to suffer from referential failure. We are obliged to choose either (a) That they are not truth-bearers and consequently neither true nor false or (b) That they are truth-bearers and per se are either true or false.

Theory 1d

All and only referentially-successful-meaningful-declarative-sentence-token-uses are truth-bearers.

Theory 1d takes option (a) above by declaring that meaningful-declarative-sentence-token-uses that fail referentially are not truth-bearers.

Theory 1e

All referentially-successful-meaningful-declarative-sentence-token-uses are truth-bearers; some meaningful-declarative-sentence-types are truth-bearers

Arguments for theory 1e

Theory 1e has the same advantages as Theory 1d. Theory 1e allows for the existence of truth-bearers (i.e., meaningful-declarative-sentence-types) in the absence of users and between uses. If for any x, where x is a use of a referentially successful token of a meaningful-declarative-sentence-type y x is a truth-bearer then y is a truth-bearer otherwise y is not a truth bearer. E.g. If all uses of all referentially successful tokens of the meaningful-declarative-sentence-type ‘The whole is greater than the part’ are truth-bearers (i.e. true or false) then the meaningful-declarative-sentence-type ‘The whole is greater than the part’ is a truth-bearer. If some but not all uses of some referentially successful tokens of the meaningful-declarative-sentence-type ‘I am Spartacus’ are true then the meaningful-declarative-sentence-type ‘I am Spartacus’ is not a truth-bearer.

Criticisms of theory 1e

Theory 1e makes implicit use of the concept of an agent or user capable of using (i.e. asserting) a referentially-successful-meaningful-declarative-sentence-token. Although Theory 1e does not depend on the actual existence (now, in the past or in the future) of such users, it does depend on the possibility and cogency of their existence. Consequently, the concept of truth-bearer under Theory 1e is dependent upon giving an account of the concept of a ‘user’. In so far as referentially-successful-meaningful-declarative-sentence-tokens are particulars (locatable in time and space) the definition of truth-bearer just in terms of referentially-successful-meaningful-declarative-sentence is attractive to those who are (or would like to be) nominalists. The introduction of ‘use’ and ‘users’ threatens the introduction of intentions, attitudes, minds &c. as less-than welcome ontological baggage.

== Sentences in languages of classical logic ==
In classical logic a sentence in a language is true or false under (and only under) an interpretation and is therefore a truth-bearer. For example, a language in the first-order predicate calculus might include one or more predicate symbols and one or more individual constants and one or more variables. The interpretation of such a language would define a domain (universe of discourse); assign an element of the domain to each individual constant; assign the denotation in the domain of some property to each unary (one-place) predicate symbol.

For example, if a language L consisted in the individual constant a, two unary predicate letters F and G and the variable x, then an interpretation I of L might define the Domain D as animals, assign Socrates to a, the denotation of the property being a man to F, and the denotation of the property being mortal to G. Under the interpretation I of L, Fa would be true if, and only if Socrates is a man, and the sentence $\forall$x(Fx $\to$ Gx) would be true if, and only if all men (in the domain) are mortal. In some texts an interpretation is said to give "meaning" to the symbols of the language. Since Fa has the value true under some (but not all) interpretations, it is not the sentence-type Fa which is said to be true but only some sentence-tokens of Fa under particular interpretations. A token of Fa without an interpretation is neither true nor false. Some sentences of a language like L are said to be true under all interpretations of the sentence, e.g. $\forall$x(Fx $\lor$ $\neg$Fx), such sentences are termed logical truths, but again such sentences are neither true nor false in the absence of an interpretation.

== Propositions ==
A number of authors use the term proposition as truth-bearers. There is no single definition or usage. Sometimes it is used to mean a meaningful declarative sentence itself; sometimes it is used to mean the meaning of a meaningful declarative sentence. This provides two possible definitions for the purposes of discussion as below

Theory 2a:

All and only meaningful-declarative-sentences are propositions

Theory 2b:

A meaningful-declarative-sentence-token expresses a proposition; two meaningful-declarative-sentence-tokens which have the same meaning express the same proposition; two meaningful-declarative-sentence-tokens with different meanings express different propositions.

(cf Wolfram 1989, p. 21)

Proposition is not always used in one or other of these ways.

Criticisms of theory 2a.

- If all and only meaningful-declarative-sentences are propositions, as advanced by Theory 2a, then the terms are synonymous and we can just as well speak of the meaningful-declarative-sentences themselves as the trutbearers - there is no distinct concept of proposition to consider, and the term proposition is literally redundant.

Criticisms of Theory 2b

- Theory 2b entails that if all meaningful-declarative-sentence-tokens typographically identical to say, "I am Spartacus" have the same meaning then they (i) express the same proposition (ii) that proposition is both true and false, contrary to the definition of truth-bearer.
- The concept of a proposition in this theory rests upon the concept of meaning as applied to meaningful-declarative-sentences, in a word synonymy among meaningful-declarative-sentence s. Quine 1970 argues that the concept of synonymy among meaningful-declarative-sentences cannot be sustained or made clear, consequently the concepts of "propositions" and "meanings of sentences" are, in effect, vacuous and superfluous

== Statements ==
Many authors consider statements as truth-bearers, though as with the term "proposition" there is divergence in definition and usage of that term. Sometimes 'statements' are taken to be meaningful-declarative-sentences; sometimes they are thought to be what is asserted by a meaningful-declarative-sentence. It is not always clear in which sense the word is used. This provides two possible definitions for the purposes of discussion as below.

A particular concept of a statement was introduced by Strawson in the 1950s.,

Consider the following:

- I: The author of Waverley is dead
- J: The author of Ivanhoe is dead
- K: I am less than six feet tall
- L: I am over six feet tall
- M: The conductor is a bachelor
- N: The conductor is married

On the assumption that the same person wrote Waverley and Ivanhoe, the two distinct patterns of characters (meaningful-declarative-sentences) I and J make the same statement but express different propositions.
The pairs of meaningful-declarative-sentences (K, L) & (M, N) have different meanings, but they are not necessarily contradictory, since K & L may have been asserted by different people, and M & N may have been asserted about different conductors.

What these examples show is that we cannot identify that which is true or false (the statement) with the sentence used in making it; for the same sentence may be used to make different statements, some of them true and some of them false. (Strawson, P.F. (1952))

This suggests:

- Two meaningful-declarative-sentence-tokens which say the same thing of the same object(s) make the same statement.

Theory 3a

All and only statements are meaningful-declarative-sentences.

Theory 3b

All and only meaningful-declarative-sentences can be used to make statements

Statement is not always used in one or other of these ways.

Arguments for theory 3a

- "All and only statements are meaningful-declarative-sentences." is either a stipulative definition or a descriptive definition. If the former, the stipulation is useful or it is not; if the latter, either the descriptive definition correctly describes English usage or it does not. In either case no arguments, as such, are applicable

Criticisms of theory 3a

- If the term statement is synonymous with the term meaningful-declarative-sentence, then the applicable criticisms are the same as those outlined under sentence below
- If all and only meaningful-declarative-sentences are statements, as advanced by Theory 3a, then the terms are synonymous and we can just as well speak of the meaningful-declarative-sentences themselves as the truth-bearers – there is no distinct concept of statement to consider, and the term statement is literally redundant.

== Thoughts ==
Frege (1919) argued that an indicative sentence in which we communicate or state something, contains both a thought and an assertion, it expresses the thought, and the thought is the sense of the sentence.

== See also ==
- William Kneale
- Truthmaker Realism
  - Barry Smith
