= John Beverley (ontologist) =

American philosopher and ontologist

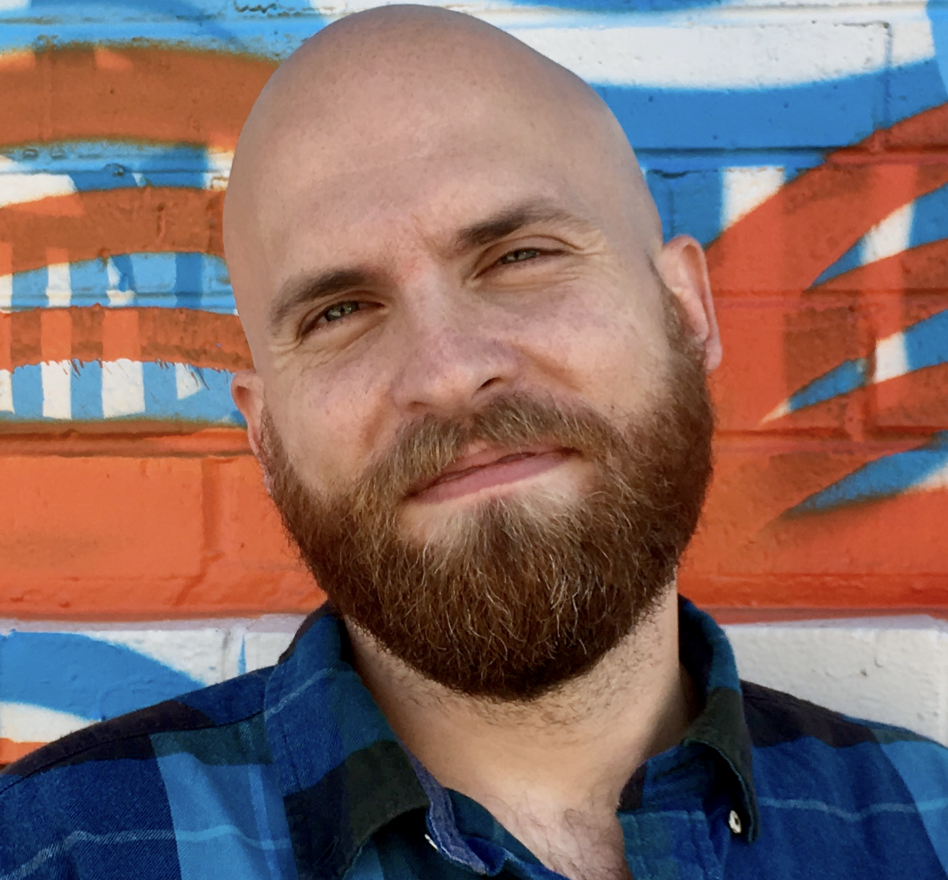
- Portrait of John Beverley
- Born: 8 April 1983 (age 43); United States
- Citizenship: American
- Education: North Carolina State University; University at Buffalo; Northwestern University (PhD, 2021)
- Known for: Basic Formal Ontology; Common Core Ontologies; VIDO
- Scientific career
- Fields: Applied ontology Philosophy; Logic; Biomedical informatics
- Workplaces: University at Buffalo; Johns Hopkins University Applied Physics Laboratory; Science Applications International Corporation; KaDSci
- Thesis: Responsibility Where We Find It (2021)
- Website: johnbeverley.com

John Beverley (born April 8, 1983) is an American philosopher and ontologist. He is an Assistant Professor of Philosophy at the University at Buffalo and the President of the National Center for Ontological Research (NCOR).

== Education and career ==
Beverley earned a Bachelor of Science in Philosophy from North Carolina State University, followed by a Master of Arts in Philosophy from the University at Buffalo in 2017. He completed his PhD at Northwestern University in 2021 with a dissertation titled Responsibility Where We Find It.

Beverley has held senior ontology consulting roles at the Johns Hopkins University Applied Physics Laboratory, Science Applications International Corporation, and KaDSci.

Beverley joined the faculty at the University at Buffalo in 2022. He became the director of the Applied Ontology MS and PhD programs in 2026.

== Research ==
Beverley's work spans applied ontology, logic, and knowledge representation. He is a co-lead developer of the Basic Formal Ontology (BFO), a top-level ontology that was adopted as an international standard under ISO/IEC 21838-2:2021. He is a member of the governance board for the Common Core Ontologies suite that extends from BFO and which is widely used in government and defense domains.

During the COVID-19 pandemic, Beverley co-authored several ontologies aimed at supporting infectious disease data integration, including the Virus Infectious Disease Ontology (VIDO) and the Coronavirus Infectious Disease Ontology (CIDO).

In 2024, Beverley was awarded a five-year, $3.8 million grant from the U.S. National Institute of Health to study the ontological foundations of aging and loneliness through the development of interoperable psychological data models.

== Editorial and public roles ==
Beverley serves on the editorial board of the journal Applied Ontology and has edited special issues on the intersection of ontologies and large language models. He is President of the National Center for Ontological Research (NCOR), a 501(3)(c) research and training initiative based in Buffalo, NY.

In 2024, Beverley was interviewed for the Association Philosophy Association (APA) Blog, where he discussed the opportunities and limitations involved in efforts to leverage applied ontology in the defense and intelligence sectors.

== Selected publications ==
- Beverley, J. et al. (2024). "Coordinating virus research: The Virus Infectious Disease Ontology." PLoS ONE, 19(1): e0285093. doi:[10.1371/journal.pone.0285093](https://doi.org/10.1371/journal.pone.0285093).
- He, Y., Beverley, J., et al. (2020). "CIDO: A community-based coronavirus ontology." Scientific Data, 7(1). doi:[10.1038/s41597-020-0523-6](https://doi.org/10.1038/s41597-020-0523-6).
- Beverley, J., Otte, J. N., Ruttenberg, A. (2022). "Formalizing change in Basic Formal Ontology." Applied Ontology, 17(1): 17–43.
