= Existential phenomenology =

Study of philosophy through experience

Existential phenomenology encompasses a wide range of thinkers who take up the view that philosophy must begin from experience like phenomenology, but argue for the temporality of personal existence as the framework for analysis of the human condition.

== Overview ==
In Being and Time, Martin Heidegger reframes Edmund Husserl's phenomenological project into what he terms fundamental ontology. This is based on an observation and analysis of Dasein ("being-there"), human being, investigating the fundamental structure of the Lebenswelt (lifeworld, Husserl's term) underlying all so-called regional ontologies of the special sciences. In Heidegger's philosophy, people are thrown into the world in a given situation, but they are also a project towards the future, possibility, freedom, wait, hope, anguish. In contrast with the philosopher Kierkegaard, Heidegger wanted to explore the problem of Dasein existentially (existenzial), rather than existentielly (existenziell) because Heidegger argued that Kierkegaard had already described the latter in "penetrating fashion". Most existentialist phenomenologists were concerned with how people are constituted by their experiences and yet how they are also free in some respect to modify both themselves and the greater world in which they live.

Building on Heidegger's language that people are "thrown into the world", Jean-Paul Sartre says that "man is a being whose existence precedes his essence". Both point out that any individual's identity is a matter of the social, historical, political, and economic situation into which he or she is born. This frees phenomenology from needing to find a universal ground to all experience, since it will always be partial and influenced by the philosopher's own situation. Maurice Merleau-Ponty argued that the lesson of Husserl's reduction is that "there is no complete reduction" because even phenomenologists cannot resist how they have been shaped by their history, culture, society, and language. In her work The Second Sex, Simone de Beauvoir explored how greatly norms of gender shape the very sense of self that women have, in distinction from men. Hannah Arendt discusses how totalitarian regimes in the 20th century presented entirely new regimes of terror that shaped how people understand political life in her work The Human Condition. Frantz Fanon explored the legacy of racism and colonialism on the psyches' of black men. However, they all in different ways also stressed the freedom which humans have to alter their experiences through rebellion, political action, writing, thinking, and being. If people are constituted by the human social world, then it is only humans that created it and can create a new world if they take up this task.

== Development ==
Besides Heidegger, other existential phenomenologists were Max Scheler, Wilhelmus Luijpen, Hannah Arendt, Karl Jaspers, Emmanuel Levinas, Gabriel Marcel, Jean-Paul Sartre, Simone de Beauvoir, Edith Stein, Maurice Merleau-Ponty, Enzo Paci and Samuel Todes. Many of these phenomenologists' conceptions of the self and self-consciousness are built on criticisms of or response to Edmund Husserl's initial views.

Sartre synthesized Husserl and Heidegger's ideas. His modifications include his replacement of Husserl's concept, epoche, with Heidegger's structure of being-in-the -world. His existential phenomenology, which is articulated in his works such as Being and Nothingness (1943), is based on the distinction between being-in-itself and being-for-itself. Beauvoir placed her discourse on existential phenomenology within her intertwining of literature and philosophy as a way to reflect concrete experience. In her works on women's lived experiences, she attempted to address the problems between the sexes as well as the reconciliation of related strands of continental philosophical traditions, which include the philosophy of Heidegger, the phenomenological methods of Husserl and Sartre, and George Wilhelm Friedrich Hegel's philosophy of history.

Arendt's existential phenomenology reflected a distrust of mass society and her preference for the preservation of social groups citing the persecution of Jews as an example of victimization by societies' atomizing processes.

== Other disciplines ==
Existential phenomenology also extends to other disciplines. For example, Leo Steinberg's essay "The Philosophical Brothel" describes Picasso's Les Demoiselles d'Avignon in a perspective that is existential-phenomenological. It has also impacted architectural theory, especially in the phenomenological and Heideggerian approaches to space, place, dwelling, technology, etc. In literary theory and criticism, Robert Magliola's Phenomenology and Literature: An Introduction (Purdue UP, 1977; rpt. 1978) was the first book to explain to Anglophonic academics – systematically and comprehensively – the range of literary theories and practices identified with "phenomenological literary criticism" on the Continent. The practices of the Francophone Geneva School (-of literary criticism), those of the Swiss-German theorist and critic Emil Staiger, and those of several other theorists/critics, are explained in detail. The influences of the phenomenological theorist Roman Ingarden, the early-phase (existentialist) Martin Heidegger, and of Mikel Dufrenne receive a treatment over 100 pages long all-told. The polemics involving phenomenology and its opponents are addressed in separate chapters, entitled respectively "Phenomenology Confronts Parisian Structuralism," and "The Problem of Validity in E. D. Hirsch and Husserl. The 1978 rpt. of Magliola's book features on its back cover very strong endorsements from Robert Scholes, Eugene Kaelin, Monroe Beardsley and Ralph Freedman.

The field of psychology includes an approach known as existential-phenomenological psychology.

In anthropology, existentialism and existential phenomenology are central to understandings of life and death, belief and ritual, certitude and incertitude, knowing and not-knowing, and action and inaction, among other concerns. This is most notably explored in the contemporary work of C. Jason Throop on experience, empathy, sentiment, suffering, action, and human will (willingness).

== See also ==
- British Society for Phenomenology
- Edith Stein
- Emmanuel Levinas
- Existentialism
- Interpretative phenomenological analysis
- Jacques Derrida
- Søren Kierkegaard
- Paul Ricoeur
- Phenomenology (philosophy)
- Society for Phenomenology and Existential Philosophy
- World Phenomenology Institute
