= Leopold Blaustein =

Polish-Jewish philosopher, aesthetician and psychologist

- Born: February 10th 1905; Lviv, Ukraine
- Died: 1942 or 1944
- Spouse: Eugenie Ginsberg

Education
- Education: University of Freiburg, University of Lviv

Philosophical work
- Region: Jewish
- School: Lvov-Warsaw School
- Notable works: Husserlian science: on the act, content and object of representations

Leopold Blaustein (February 10, 1905 – 1942/1944) was a Polish-Jewish philosopher, aesthetician, and psychologist. He was among the last generation of Kazimierz Twardowski's students and is also noted for his critique of Edmund Husserl's philosophy. His philosophical works are based on a combination of phenomenology and the analytical approach of the Lwów-Warsaw School of logic.

Blaustein is also cited as a pioneer in the description of mental reception of motion pictures and radio programs.

== Background ==
Leopold Blaustein was born in 1905 into a Polish-Jewish family. He was the son of Majer Blaustein, a Merchant and Rachel Blaustein née Landau. Leopold was educated in Lvov and studied philosophy and German philology at John Casimir University. In 1925, he was recommended by Roman Ingarden and Kazimierz Ajdukiewicz to study under Husserl in Freiburg. For his Ph.D., he wrote the dissertation Husserlian science: on the act, content and object of representations. He finished his education during his study visits in the city (1925) and in Berlin (1927-1928).

The circumstance of Blaustein's death is still uncertain. Some sources claim that the Germans murdered him and his family in 1942. Along with his wife Eugenie Ginsberg, he was identified as one of the philosophers of the Lvov-Warsaw School who died in Nazi ghettos. There are also those who claim he committed suicide in 1944.

== Works ==
Twardowski exerted the most influence on Blaustein. One of the latter's most important work - Husserlian science: on the act, content and object of representations - was completed under his supervision. This work, which was published as a book in 1928, was divided into three: the historical reconstruction of the problem of the act, content, and object of presentations; the presentations of Husserl's theory; and, Blaustein's critique. The distinctions between the act, content, and object of presentations is considered a subject that is close to his mentor. Twardowski's influence is also evident in Blaustein's efforts to develop the full heuristic value of Twardowski's theory of intentionality.

Blaustein was also impressed with Husserl as a person and his philosophical commitment but he doubted his philosophy. He became interested in Husserl's content theory during his investigation of phenomenology and produced his definition of the concept as a descriptive psychology that can serve to investigate lived experiences. Blaustein would complete several original works on descriptive psychology. One of his noted positions was his critique of Husserl's doctrine of constitution. He maintained that content is not dependent on consciousness but on the world. Blaustein, in his investigations of the structure of lived experiences - would, however, use the phenomenological methods that Husserl developed, particularly those that were introduced in the first edition of Logical Investigations (1900-1901).

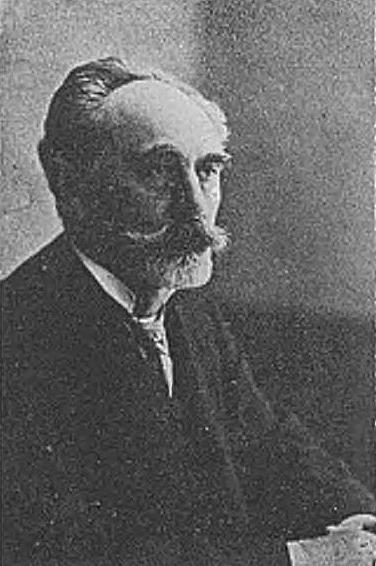
The philosophy of Roman Ingarden influenced Blaustein's theories on act and object.

Until his death, Blaustein continued to engage Ingarden over the concept of act and object, which were developed in Husserl's works (e.g. Logical Investigations). In this debate, he maintained that the object of representation is not a part of act itself since it accompanies it. Blaustein also introduced a revised version of Ingarden's theory of purely intentional objects by adapting it to imaginative intuition. He maintained that an imaginative object is also an intentional object due to the following factors:

- the imaginative object is founded on an imaginative presentation;
- it can be reproduced by aesthetic experience; and,
- it can become an object of derivative intentionality once it loses its connection with imaginative intuition.

Blaustein's conceptualization is, however, differentiated from Ingarden's purely intentional objects based on his notion that the object is a strictly psychic phenomenon. Ingarden only indirectly linked objects to the psyche.

=== Aesthetics ===
There are three dominant interconnected fields in Blaustein's works on aesthetics. These are the theory of aesthetic perception, the theory of attitudes, and the theory of representation. His theory of aesthetic attitude holds that three kinds of perception have to be distinguished in our aesthetic commerce with various realms of art: perceptive, imaginative, and signitive ones. Each of these, for Blaustein, are different and applicable to different artistic realms. It is suggested that Blaustein's views on aesthetics are founded on his opposition to Husserl's transcendental idealism.

Blaustein also posited that "concretization" is crucial in investigating an artistic work because its aesthetic perception assumes the form of one of its concretizations. His theory addressed concretization in three contexts:

1. in connection with ontological analyses dealing with the structure of different types of works of art;
2. while investigating the process of getting acquainted with a literary work; and
3. in connection with the aesthetic experience.

Blaustein has been credited for developing a groundbreaking theory that described the psychological reception of motion pictures and radio programs. Drawing from Ingarden's phenomenological approach, he investigated the perceptual processes and the aesthetic and extra-aesthetic feelings that accompany the reception of these media. In Przedstawienia Imaginatywyne, he described the objects represented in pictures as quasi-spatial objects for the spectators or objects that rest in its own space and independent of the space surrounding the spectator. This spatial conceptualization was described as peculiar, constituting a certain type of aperture in the spectator's space so that the space represented in the picture blends with the space occupied by the picture. Blaustein's magnum opus, Die ästhetische Perzeption, was completed in 1939 but was lost during World War II.

Blaustein was also one of the first to recognize the educational role of the cinema, treating it as a cultural institution capable of altering the views of its audience. Some of his works in this area include Representations of Imagination (1930), Schematic and Symbolic Representations (1931), and On the principles of humanistic psychology (1935).
