= British Society for Phenomenology =

- Founder: Wolfe Mays
- Established: 1967
- Mission: The study of Phenomenology
- President: Keith Crome
- Website: britishphenomenology.org.uk

The British Society for Phenomenology (BSP) is an organisation whose purpose is to pursue and exchange philosophical ideas inspired by phenomenology. It was established in 1967 by Wolfe Mays. The current president of the BSP is Keith Crome. The society accomplishes its aims through a journal, an annual conference (as well as other events), and a podcast.

== Journal of the British Society for Phenomenology (JBSP) ==
The Journal of the British Society for Phenomenology was launched in 1970. Edited by Wolfe Mays, the president of the BSP, it began by publishing a volume each year consisting of three issues. Wolfe Mays remained the editor up to his death in 2005. Assistant editor Ullrich Haase then took on the editorship. During Haase's leadership, the journal went from three issues a year to four. Haase also moved the journal from a private publisher to Taylor and Francis, allowing the membership and the public to easily access a wealth of material online, going back to 1970 when the JBSP began.

2019 was the 50th anniversary of the journal, and after 14 years as editor, Haase signalled his intention to stand down from his role, while completing his work on the remaining 2019 volume publications as well as some planned special issues for 2020 and beyond. To celebrate the 50th anniversary, Haase convened a three-day event titled the 'JBSP 50th Anniversary Conference' in Manchester at the International Anthony Burgess Foundation. Keynote speakers were the renowned international academics Babette Babich, Robert Bernasconi, and Francesca Brencio.

In the wake of Hasse stepping down as editor the society instituted an editorial collective. In February 2019 Darian Meacham was appointed as editor-in-chief of the editorial collective, working towards the 2020 volume. Other members of the collective include Keith Crome (former BSP president), Andrea Rehberg, William Large, Matt Bernard, Michaela Summa, and Haase (thus continuing his association with the journal).

The JBSP is an internationally refereed journal and operates a process of at least two referees blind peer-reviewing. It publishes papers on phenomenology and existential philosophy as well as contributions from other fields of philosophy, the humanities and the human sciences. The journal also publishes book reviews.

The online version of the Journal of the British Society for Phenomenology is hosted at Taylor & Francis Online.

== BSP Events ==
=== Annual Conference ===
Each year the British Society for Phenomenology convenes an annual conference at a different location within the UK. Most recently the society has held its annual conference at Manchester Metropolitan University (MMU) (2019 and 2016); University of Kent (2018); and University of Brighton (2017). In 2020, the conference went online in response to the COVID-19 pandemic, although it was still co-organised with an academic institution, the University of Exeter. The conferences usually have between two and four high-profile keynote speakers who are invited by the conference committee. Recent keynotes have included the renowned international academics and practitioners Havi Carel, Felix O’Murchadha, Tanja Staehler, Luna Dolezal, Niall Keane, Linda Finlay, Mariana Ortega, Sophie Loidolt, and Dan Zahavi.

As well as keynote speakers, there is a call for papers for academics and practitioners to apply to present their work. All applications are blind peer-reviewed by the conference committee. Between 2016 and 2019, the conference format was a single track event, in 2020 the online conference had dual parallel sessions.

=== Workshops and Symposia ===
The BSP also funds and convenes workshops and symposia. Most recently, these have included 'Intentionality and the Human' at the Great North Museum (Newcastle upon Tyne, 2016); 'Cormac McCarthy and Philosophy' at the People's History Museum (for MMU, 2017); and 'Embodied Subjects – Phenomenology, Literature, and the Health Humanities' at the International Anthony Burgess Foundation (for MMU, 2018). Speakers have included Francis Halsal, Patrick O’Connor, and Raymond Tallis.

== BSP Podcast ==
The BSP Podcast was launched on 10 October 2016. It was created by Matt Barnard, a member of the British Society for Phenomenology's executive committee. The podcast is a free audio streaming service which is organised into seasons, with episodes released each week. It is hosted on the podcast platform, Podbean. It aims to ‘preserve, archive, and share the work of phenomenologists associated with the society’. The content comes from recordings of papers given at BSP events, such as the annual conference as well as workshops and symposia.

== See also ==
- World Phenomenology Institute
- Society for Phenomenology and Existential Philosophy
- Phenomenology (philosophy)
- Existential phenomenology
- Edmund Husserl
- Edith Stein
- Martin Heidegger
- Maurice Merleau-Ponty
- Jean-Paul Sartre
- Paul Ricoeur
- Emmanuel Levinas
- Jacques Derrida
