= Haase =

Haase is a surname. Notable people with the surname include:

- Barry Haase (born 1945), Australian politician
- Bertil Haase (1923–2014), Swedish modern pentathlete
- Camila Haase Quiros, Costa Rican swimmer
- Christian Haase (born 1966), German politician
- Curt Haase (1881–1943), German general
- Eric Haase (born 1992), American baseball player
- Erich Haase (1859–1894), German physician and entomologist
- Ernie Haase (born 1964), American tenor
- Esther Haase (born 1966), German photographer
- Friedrich Haase (1827–1911), German actor
- Friedrich Gottlob Haase (1808–1867), German classical scholar
- Helga Haase (1934–1989), Polish-East German speed skater
- Hugo Haase (1863–1919), German politician
- Jella Haase (born 1992), German actress
- Jerod Haase (born 1974), American college basketball coach
- John Haase (author) (1923–2006), German dentist and author
- John Haase (criminal) (born 1948), British gangster and drug dealer
- Jürgen Haase (athlete) (born 1945), German runner
- Mandy Haase (born 1982), German hockey player
- Martin Haase (born 1962), German Esperantist and linguist
- Rebekka Haase (born 1993), German sprinter
- Robin Haase (born 1987), Dutch tennis player
- Sheriauna Haase (born 2006), Canadian athlete, dancer, and actor
- Ullrich Haase (born 1962), British philosopher
- Werner Haase (1900–1950), German professor of medicine and SS office
