= Lawns (disambiguation) =

Lawns are aesthetically maintained grassy areas.

Lawns or The Lawns may also refer to:

- Lawns, West Yorkshire, Wakefield, England
- The Lawns, Hull, Yorkshire, England
- The Lawns Estate, Swindon, England

== See also ==
- Lawns Park, Havering, London, England
- Lawn (disambiguation)
