= John Beverley =

John Beverley may refer to:

- John of Beverley (d. 721), Anglo-Saxon bishop
- John Beverley (politician) (fl. 1414), MP for Cambridge
- John Beverley (administrator) (1743–1827), administrator, and later esquire bedell, of Cambridge University
- John Beverley (Latin Americanist), literary and cultural critic
- John Beverley (ontologist), American philosopher and ontologist at University at Buffalo
- John Beverley, early name for Sid Vicious (1957–1979)

== See also ==
- John Beverley Robinson (1821–1896), mayor of Toronto
