= Barry Smith (ontologist) =

American philosopher

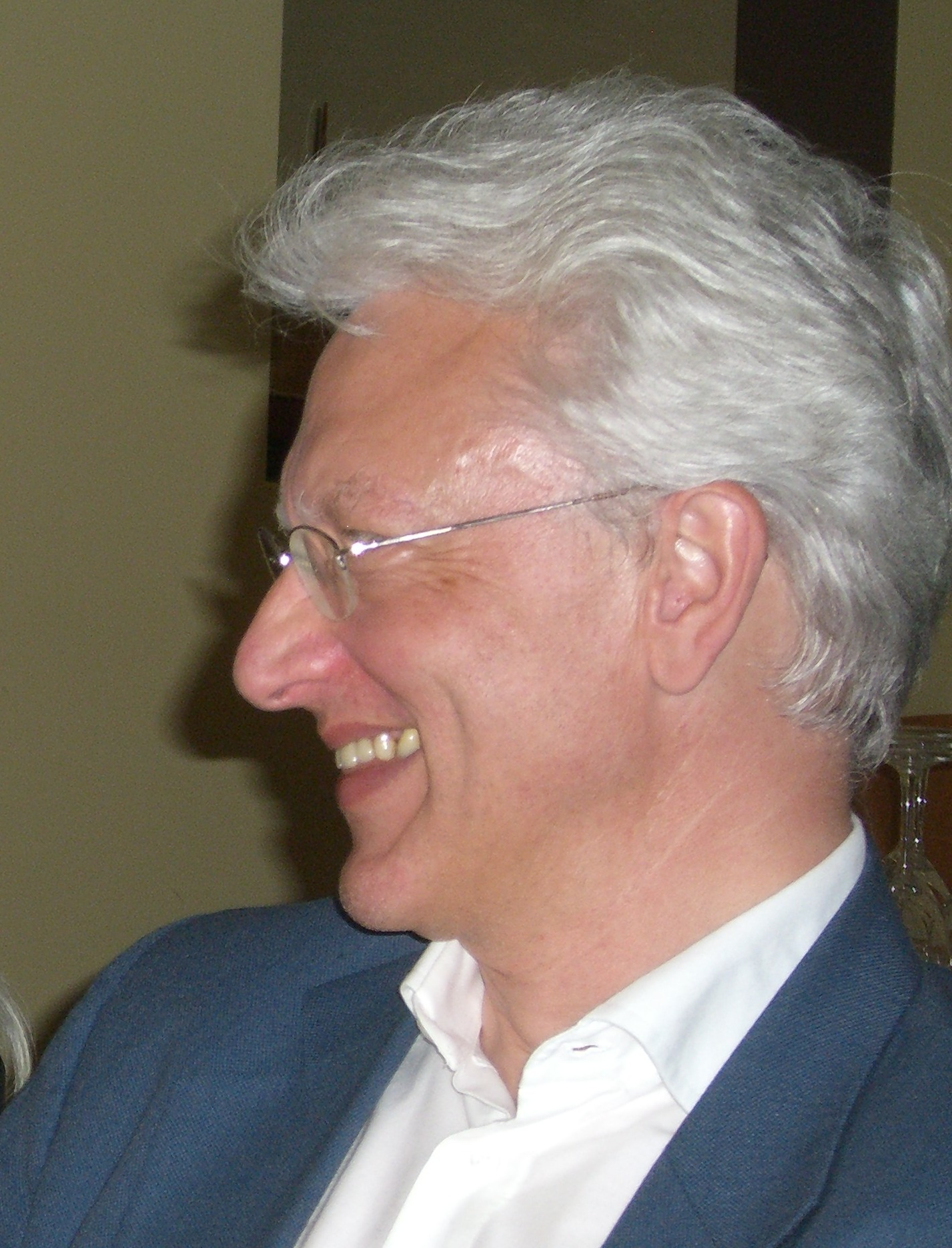
- Born: 4 June 1952 (age 74); Bury, England
- Citizenship: American
- Education: University of Oxford; University of Manchester (PhD, 1976)
- Known for: Truthmaker theory European Society for Analytic Philosophy; IFOMIS; OBO Foundry; Basic Formal Ontology
- Awards: Wolfgang Paul Award of the Alexander von Humboldt Foundation
- Scientific career
- Fields: Ontology; Philosophy; Biomedical informatics
- Workplaces: University of Manchester; University of Sheffield; International Academy of Philosophy, Liechtenstein; University at Buffalo
- Thesis: The Ontology of Reference: Studies in Logic and Phenomenology (1976)
- Doctoral advisor: Wolfe Mays
- Doctoral students: Berit Brogaard; David Koepsell
- Other notable students: Amie Thomasson
- Website: ontology.buffalo.edu/smith/

Barry Smith (born 4 June 1952) is an Anglo-American philosopher researching in the field of applied ontology.

== Education ==
From 1970 to 1973, Smith studied Mathematics and Philosophy at the University of Oxford. He obtained his PhD from the University of Manchester in 1976 for a dissertation on ontology and reference in Husserl and Frege. The dissertation was supervised by Wolfe Mays.

Among the cohort of graduate students supervised by Mays in Manchester at that time were Kevin Mulligan (Geneva/Lugano), and Peter Simons (Trinity College, Dublin). Both shared with Smith an interest in analytic metaphysics and in the contributions of turn-of-the-century Continental philosophers and logicians to central issues of analytic philosophy. In 1979 they together founded the Seminar for Austro-German Philosophy, which organized workshops and conferences centered around the work of early Central European philosophers from Bolzano to Tarski and their impact on subsequent generations. A central role in this respect was played by Husserl's contributions to formal ontology. Roderick Chisholm refers to the role played by these meetings in contemporary philosophy.

== Career ==
Smith has held academic posts at the University of Sheffield, the University of Manchester, the International Academy of Philosophy (Liechtenstein), and since 1994 at the University at Buffalo. In 2025 Smith established in collaboration with John Beverley an online Masters and PhD degree programs in Applied Ontology. His students in Buffalo have included: Berit Brogaard, Leo Zaibert, Ryan Riccucci and John Beverley.

From 2002 to 2006, Smith served as Director of the Institute for Formal Ontology and Medical Information Science (IFOMIS), initially in Leipzig and then, from 2004, in Saarbrücken.

In 2005, Smith founded the National Center for Ontological Research (NCOR), under the auspices of which he initiated in 2006 the Ontology for the Intelligence Community, subsequently STIDS, conference series. In 2009 he founded the International Conference on Biomedical Ontology (ICBO).

From 1992 to 2016, Smith served as editor of The Monist: An International Quarterly Journal of General Philosophical Inquiry.

From 2016, he served as editor of international standard ISO/IEC 21838: Top Level Ontologies, Parts 1 and 2, which were published by ISO in 2021. Part 1 specifies the requirements for being a top-level (which means: domain-neutral) ontology. Part 2 is devoted to Basic Formal Ontology (BFO). In its issue of September 28, 2022 the Frankfurter Allgemeine Zeitung refers to BFO as the first example of a piece of philosophy that has been accepted as an industrial norm, describing this as a 'small sensation in the history of science'.

In the course of his career, Smith has held visiting positions at universities in Austria, Finland, Malta, and the Netherlands; as well as in the University of Texas Southwestern Medical Center; in the Ecole des Hautes Etudes en Sciences Sociales, Paris, and also in the Ricerche di Dinamica dei Sistemi e di Bioingegneria (LADSEB), now the Laboratory for Applied Ontology, in Padua.

Since 2019, Smith has served as visiting professor in the University of Italian Switzerland.

== Research activities ==
=== Historical background of work in ontology ===
From the beginning of his career, Smith worked in the field of ontology, his interest in this field having been prompted by the book Time and Modes of Being by the Polish philosopher Roman Ingarden. At first he focused on the history of ontology as a sub-discipline of philosophy, focusing especially on philosophers in the tradition of Brentano and Husserl, including not only Ingarden but also other pupils of Husserl such as Adolf Reinach and Johannes Daubert. A special focus was on the theory of ontological dependence and part-whole relations proposed by Husserl, a theory which was applied by Husserl's students for example to the understanding of the ontology of mental and linguistic acts. In 1984 he co-authored the paper "Truth-Makers", which is said to have "introduced the truth-maker idea as a contribution to the correspondence theory of truth", a still-active research program at the borderlines of logic, semantics and philosophical ontology that is based on a new understanding of the correspondence theory of truth.

=== Geospatial ontology ===
From the mid-1990s, Smith's work in ontology has exerted an impact on multiple domains outside philosophy, starting in 1995 in a collaboration with David Mark, one of the founders of geographic information science (GIS). In this connection Smith introduced the idea of fiat objects to describe (often rectangular) geospatial entities, such as postal districts and real estate parcels, which are not separated from their surroundings by any physical discontinuity. This idea has been adopted also in other fields.

=== Biomedical ontology ===
Since 2000, much of Smith's research has been centered on the application of ontology in biomedical informatics, where he has worked on a variety of projects relating to biomedical terminologies and electronic health records. He is a founding coordinating editor of the OBO Foundry, and has served as a member of the Scientific Advisory Board of the Gene Ontology (GO) Consortium and of the Ontology for Biomedical Investigations (OBI). He contributes to the development of a number of biological and biomedical ontologies, including the Protein Ontology, the Plant Ontology, and others. Between 2005 and 2015 he was a co-PI of the NIH National Center for Biomedical Ontology, where he was responsible especially for dissemination of ontology best practices and for providing training opportunities for biomedical ontologists. Between 2013 and 2018 he served as ontology lead on the NIAID ImmPort project.

=== Social ontology ===
Smith works also on the ontology of social reality, particularly in connection with the work of John Searle. He served as consultant to Hernando de Soto, director of the Institute for Liberty and Democracy in Peru, on projects relating to the advancement of property and business rights among the poor in developing countries. De Soto's work is based on the crucial role of documents—title deeds, stocks and shares, insurance policies—in ensuring the sorts of rights with which we are accustomed in developed economies. Drawing on De Soto's ideas Smith proposed a theory of document acts that would parallel the theory of speech acts developed by Reinach in 1913 and then by J. L. Austin and Searle in the 1960s.

=== Intelligence, defense and security ===
Since 2008, Smith has worked on ontology initiatives in the military and intelligence field. In 2008–2010 he served as technical lead on a project sponsored by the US Army Net-Centric Data Strategy Center of Excellence (ANCDS CoE) to create the Universal Core Semantic Layer (UCore-SL). Since 2010 he was worked on a series of initiatives sponsored by the US Army Intelligence and Information Warfare Directorate (I2WD) to create a framework for semantic enhancement of intelligence data in the Cloud. Since 2014 he is collaborator on initiatives of the US Air Force Research Laboratory on planning, mission assurance, and lifecycle management. In this connection he has worked on the creation of an ontology for joint military doctrine, designed to support the use of information technology in joint operations by allowing computational access to the contents of Joint Doctrine publications. He has also contributed to the ecosystem of Space Domain Ontologies created under the direction of CUBRC in Buffalo, and he is one of the founding members of the Department of Defense and Intelligence Community Ontology Working Group (DIOWG), now the National Security Ontology Working Group (NSOWG).

In January 2024, a memorandum was signed by the chief data officers of the Office of the Director of National Intelligence (ODNI) and of the DOD Chief Digital and Artificial Intelligence Office (CDAO) establishing BFO as 'baseline standards for ontology development' in the DOD and Intelligence Community.

=== Industrial Ontologies Foundry ===
Since 2016, Smith has been involved in the Industrial Ontologies Foundry (IOF) initiative, which is creating a set of open ontologies to support the data needs of the manufacturing and engineering industries in a way that will advance data interoperability. Basic Formal Ontology, which serves as the top-level hub of the IOF, has been applied in the development of ontologies in many areas of engineering, including maintenance, supply chain, product life cycle, and additive manufacturing.

=== Artificial intelligence and complex systems ===
In 2022, Smith and German scientist Jobst Landgrebe co-authored the book Why Machines Will Never Rule the World. Artificial Intelligence Without Fear. A symposium on the book was published in the journal Cosmos + Taxis. and a second, revised and enlarged, edition appeared in May 2025.

=== Recognition ===
- 1984–85, 1994 Humboldt Fellow, University of Erlangen (1984–85), University of Hamburg (1994), University of Konstanz (1994)
- 1999 Fellow of the American Philosophical Society
- 2002 Wolfgang Paul Award, Alexander von Humboldt Foundation
- 2004 SUNY Distinguished Professor
- 2010 First Paolo Bozzi Prize for Ontology, University of Turin
- 2014 Fellow of the American College of Medical Informatics (FACMI)
- 2025 Fellow of the International Association for Ontology and Its Applications (FIAOA)

Leo Zaibert's The Theory and Practice of Ontology (2016) and Gloria Zúñiga y Postigo and Gerald J. Erion's Barry Smith an sich (2017) are Festschrifts containing studies of Smith's work by colleagues and students.
