= Applied ontology =

Practical application of ontology

Applied ontology is the application of ontology for practical purposes. This can involve employing ontological methods or resources to specific domains, such as management, relationships, biomedicine, information science or geography. Alternatively, applied ontology can aim more generally at developing improved methodologies for recording and organizing knowledge.

== In data and information science ==
Applied ontology in the data and information domain is a quickly growing field. It has found major applications in areas such as biological research, artificial intelligence, banking, healthcare, and defense. In October 2025 the world's first academic program in Applied Ontology began admitting students.

Ontologies can be used for structuring data in a machine-readable manner. In this context, an ontology is a controlled vocabulary of classes that can be placed in hierarchical relations with each other. These classes can represent entities in the real world which data is about. Data can then be linked to the formal structure of these ontologies to aid dataset interoperability, along with retrieval and discovery of information. The classes in an ontology can be limited to a relatively narrow domain (such as an ontology of occupations), or expansively cover all of reality with highly general classes (such as in Basic Formal Ontology).

Much work in applied ontology is carried out within the framework of the Semantic Web. Ontologies can structure data and add useful semantic content to it, such as definitions of classes and relations between entities, including subclass relations. The semantic web makes use of languages designed to allow for ontological content, including the Resource Description Framework (RDF) and the Web Ontology Language (OWL).

== In social science ==
Social scientists adopt a number of approaches to ontology. Some of these are:

1. Realism - the idea that facts are "out there" just waiting to be discovered;
2. Empiricism - the idea that we can observe the world and evaluate those observations in relation to facts;
3. Positivism - which focuses on the observations themselves, attending more to claims about facts than to facts themselves;
4. Grounded theory - which seeks to derive theories from facts;
5. Engaged theory - which moves across different levels of interpretation, linking different empirical questions to ontological understandings;
6. Postmodernism - which regards facts as fluid and elusive, and recommends focusing only on observational claims.

The challenge of applying ontology in the social sciences lies in ontology's emphasis on a world view orthogonal to epistemology. The emphasis is on being rather than on doing (as implied by "applied") or on knowing. This is explored by philosophers and pragmatists like Fernando Flores and Martin Heidegger.

One way in which that emphasis plays out is in the concept of "speech acts": acts of promising, ordering, apologizing, requesting, inviting or sharing. The study of these acts from an ontological perspective is one of the driving forces behind relationship-oriented applied ontology. This can involve concepts championed by ordinary language philosophers like Ludwig Wittgenstein.

Applying ontology can also involve looking at the relationship between a person's world and that person's actions. The context or clearing is highly influenced by the being of the subject or the field of being itself. This view is highly influenced by the philosophy of phenomenology, the works of Heidegger, and others.

== See also ==
- Foundation ontology
- Applied philosophy
- Bertrand Russell
- John Searle
- Barry Smith
- Nicola Guarino, researcher in the formal ontology of information systems
