= Truthmaker theory =

Branch of metaphysics

Truthmaker theory is "the branch of metaphysics that explores the relationships between what is true and what exists". The basic intuition behind truthmaker theory is that truth depends on being. For example, a perceptual experience of a green tree may be said to be true because there actually is a green tree. But if there were no tree there, it would be false. So the experience by itself does not ensure its truth or falsehood, it depends on something else. Expressed more generally, truthmaker theory is the thesis that "the truth of truthbearers depends on the existence of truthmakers". A perceptual experience is the truthbearer in the example above. Various representational entities, like beliefs, thoughts or assertions can act as truthbearers. Truthmaker theorists are divided about what type of entity plays the role of truthmaker; popular candidates include states of affairs and tropes.

Truthmaker maximalism is the thesis that every truth has a truthmaker. An alternative view is truthmaker atomism, the thesis that only atomic sentences have truthmakers. Truthmaker atomism remains true to the basic intuition that truth depends on being by holding that the truth of molecular sentences depends on the truth of atomic sentences, whose truth in turn depends on being.

All non-maximalist positions accept that there are truthmaker gaps: truths without truthmakers. Opponents have tried to disprove truthmaker theory by showing that there are so-called deep truthmaker gaps: truthbearers that not only lack a truthmaker but whose truths do not even depend on being. Various principles governing the truthmaking relation have been proposed in order to make the intuitions about the role and nature of truthmaking explicit. Truthmaker theory is closely related to the correspondence theory of truth, but not identical to it. Truthmaker theory has been applied to various fields in metaphysics, often with the goal of exposing ontological cheaters: theorists who are committed to certain beliefs but do not or cannot account for the existence of a truthmaker for these beliefs.

== Overview ==
In Truth-Makers (1984), Kevin Mulligan, Peter Simons and Barry Smith introduced the truth-maker idea as a contribution to the correspondence theory of truth. Logically atomic empirical sentences such as "John kissed Mary" have truthmakers, typically events or tropes corresponding to the main verbs of the sentences in question. Mulligan et al. explore extensions of this idea to sentences of other sorts, but they do not embrace any position of truthmaker maximalism, according to which every truthbearer has a truthmaker.

This maximalist position leads to philosophical difficulties, such as the question of what the truthmaker for an ethical, modal or mathematical truthbearer could be. Someone who is deeply enough committed to truthmakers and who simultaneously doubts that a truthmaker could be found for a certain kind of truthbearer will simply deny that that truthbearer could be true. Those who find the Parmenidean insight sufficiently compelling often take it to be a particularly enlightening metaphysical pursuit to search for truthmakers of these kinds of propositions.

Another difficulty for the claim that every truthbearer has a truthmaker is with negations of existential propositions (or, equivalently, universal propositions). In the example of asking if unicorns exist, proposals include the totality of all things, or some worldly state of affairs such as x1's not being a unicorn, x2's not being a unicorn, ..., and everything's being x1, or x2, or ... (the latter suggestion is due to Richard M. Gale).

David Lewis has proposed a more moderate version of the truthmaker theory on which truthmakers are only required for positive propositions (e.g., there must be a truthmaker for the proposition that there are horses, but not for the equally true proposition that there are no unicorns). What makes a negative proposition p true is the lack of a falsemaker for it, i.e., the lack of a truthmaker for the negation of p. Thus what makes it true that there are no unicorns is the lack of a truthmaker for the proposition that there are unicorns, i.e., the lack of unicorns.

Truthmaker theorists differ as to what entities are the truthmakers of various truthbearers. Some say that the truthmaker of the proposition that Socrates is sitting (assuming Socrates is) is "Socrates' being seated" (whatever exactly that might turn out to be on the correct ontology) and in general the truthmaker of the truthbearer expressed by a sentence s can be denoted by the participial nominalization of s. Others will say that the truthmaker of the proposition that Socrates is sitting is just "Socrates" himself. In any case, the truthmaker is supposed to be something concrete, and on the first view is that whose existence is reported by the truthbearer and on the second view is that which the truthbearer is about.

While the existence of truthmakers may seem an abstruse question, concrete instances are at the heart of a number of philosophical issues. Thus, J. L. Mackie has argued that the truthmakers of moral claims would be "queer entities", too strange to exist, and hence all moral claims are false. Alternatively, a divine command metaethicist may insist that the only possible candidate for a truthmaker of a moral claim is a command from a perfect God, and hence if moral claims are true and a truthmaker theory holds, then God exists. Thus the disagreement between various metaethical schools is in part a disagreement over what kinds of truthmakers moral claims would have if these claims were true and over whether such truthmakers exist.

== Truthmaker gaps ==
A truthmaker gap is a truth that lacks a truthmaker. Truthmaker maximalists hold that there are no truthmaker gaps: every truth has a truthmaker. Truthmaker non-maximalists, on the other hand, allow that some truths lack a truthmaker. Truthmaker non-maximalists still count as truthmaker theorists in the sense that they hold onto the core intuition of truthmaker theory that truth depends on being.

Atomic truthmaker theories, which have their root in logical atomism, are examples of such a position. According to them, only atomic sentences have truthmakers. A sentence is atomic or simple if it does not have other sentences as proper parts. For example, "The sun is shining" is an atomic sentence while "The sun is shining and the wind is blowing" is a non-atomic or molecular sentence since it is made up of two sentences linked by the conjunction "and". In propositional calculus molecular sentences are composed through truth-functional logical connectives. Molecular sentences lack truthmakers according to atomic truthmaker theories and therefore constitute truthmaker gaps. But the fact that the truth values of molecular sentences depends on the truth values of its constituents (if only truth-functional connectives are allowed) ensures that truth still depends on being.

This type of truthmaker gap has been called a "shallow" truthmaker gap. Shallow truthmaker gaps are contrasted with "deep" truthmaker gaps. Deep truthmaker gaps are truths that do not depend on being. They therefore pose a challenge to any type of truthmaker theory. In terms of possible worlds, a deep truthmaker gap is a proposition that is true in one possible world and false in another where there is no difference between these two worlds beside the truth value of this proposition. Critics of truthmaker theory have tried to find deep truthmaker gaps in order to refute truthmaker theory in general.

== Truthmaking principles ==
Various principles governing the truthmaking relation have been proposed. They aim to make our intuitions about the role and nature of truthmaking explicit.

The entailment principle states that if entity e is a truthmaker for proposition p and p entails proposition q then e is also a truthmaker for q.

The conjunction principle states that if entity e is a truthmaker for the conjunction of proposition p and proposition q then e is also a truthmaker for p.

The disjunction principle states that if entity e is a truthmaker for the disjunction of proposition p and proposition q then e is either a truthmaker of p or a truthmaker of q.

These principles seem intuitively to be true but it has been shown that they lead to implausible conclusions when combined with other plausible principles.

== Relation to the correspondence theory of truth ==
The correspondence theory of truth states that truth consists in correspondence with reality. Or in the words of Thomas Aquinas: "A judgment is said to be true when it conforms to the external reality". Truthmaker theory is closely related to correspondence theory; some authors see it as a modern version of correspondence theory. The similarity between the two can be seen in the following example definitions:

- Correspondence theory: David's belief that the sky is blue is true if and only if this belief stands in a correspondence-relation to the fact that the sky is blue.
- Truthmaker theory: David's belief that the sky is blue is true if and only if this belief stands in a truthmaking-relation to the fact that the sky is blue.

But despite the obvious similarities there are a few important differences between truthmaker theory and correspondence theory. For one, correspondence theory aims to give a substantive account or a definition of what truth is. Truthmaker theory, on the other hand, has the goal of determining how truth depends on being. So it presupposes the notion of truth instead of defining it. While it seems natural to combine truthmaker theory with a correspondence-conception of truth, this is not necessary. Another difference between the two theories is that correspondence is a symmetric relation while the truthmaking relation is asymmetric.

== Applications ==
Arguments based on truthmaker theory have been used in various fields to criticize so-called "ontological cheaters". An ontological cheater is someone who is committed to a certain belief but does not or cannot account for the existence of a truthmaker for this belief. If such a belief was true then its truth would be brute or free-floating: it would be disconnected from any underlying reality. This is opposed to the basic intuition behind truthmaker theory that truth depends on being.

Defense strategies open to theorists accused of ontological cheating include denying that the proposition in question is true, denying the legitimacy of truthmaker theory as a whole or finding a so-called "proxy" or "trace" within their preferred ontology. A proxy or trace, in this context, is an entity that can act as a truthmaker for the proposition in question even though it is not obvious that this proposition is about this entity. An example of such a strategy in actualism is to use actual but abstract objects as proxies for propositions about possible objects, whose existence is denied by actualism.

=== Presentism ===
One such criticism has been leveled against presentism. Presentism is the view that only the present exists, i.e. that past entities or events lack existence. Eternalism is the opposite of presentism. It holds that past, present and future existents are equally real. Beliefs about the past and the future are very common, for example the belief that dinosaurs existed. Providing a truthmaker for this belief is quite straightforward for eternalists: they may claim that the dinosaurs themselves or facts about dinosaurs act as truthmakers. This is unproblematic since, for eternalists, past entities have regular existence. This strategy is not available to the presentists since they deny that past entities have existence. But there seem to be no obvious truthmaker candidates for this belief among the present entities. The presentist would have to be labeled an ontological cheater unless they can find a truthmaker within their ontology.

=== Phenomenalism ===
Phenomenalism has been subjected to a similar criticism. Phenomenalism is the view that only phenomena exist. It is opposed to the common sense intuition that the material objects we perceive exist independently of our perceptual experiences of them and that they even exist when not perceived. This includes for example the belief that valuables locked inside a safe do not cease to exist despite the fact that no one observes them in there, which would, of course, defeat the purpose of locking them inside in the first place. The phenomenalist faces the problem of how to account for the truth of this belief. A well-known solution to this problem comes from John Stuart Mill. John claimed that we can account for unperceived objects in terms of counterfactual conditionals: It is true that the valuables are in the safe because if someone looked inside then this person would have a corresponding sensory impression. But this solution does not satisfy the truthmaker theorist since it still leaves open what the truthmaker for this counterfactual conditional is. It is not clear how such a truthmaker could be found within the phenomenalist ontology.

=== Actualism ===
Actualism is the view that everything there is, is actual, i.e. that only actual things have existence. Actualism contrasts with possibilism, the view that there are some entities that are merely possible. Actualists face the problem of how to account for the truthmakers of modal truths, like "it was possible for the Cuban Missile Crisis to escalate into a full-scale nuclear war", "there could have been purple cows" or "it is necessary that all cows are animals". Actualists have proposed various solutions, but there is no consensus as to which one is the best solution.

A well-known account relies on the notion of possible worlds, conceived as actual abstract objects, for example as maximal consistent sets of propositions or of states of affairs. A set of propositions is maximal if, for any statement p, either p or not-p is a member. Possible worlds act as truthmakers for modal truths. For example, there is a possible world which is inhabited by purple cows. This world is a truthmaker for "there could have been purple cows". Cows are animals in all possible worlds that are inhabited by cows. So all worlds are the truthmaker of "it is necessary that all cows are animals". This account relies heavily on a logical notion of modality, since possibility and necessity are defined in terms of consistency. This dependency has prompted some philosophers to assert that no truthmakers at all are needed for modal truths, that modal truths are true "by default". This position involves abandoning truthmaker maximalism.

An alternative solution to the problem of truthmakers for modal truths is based on the notion of "essence". Objects have their properties either essentially or accidentally. The essence of an object involves all the properties it has essentially. The essence of a thing defines its nature: what it fundamentally is. On this type of account, the truthmaker for "it is necessary that all cows are animals" is that it belongs to the essence of cows to be animals. The truthmaker for "there could have been purple cows" is that color is not essential to cows. Some essentialist theories focus on object essences, i.e. that certain properties are essential to a specific object. Other essentialist theories focus on kind essences, i.e. that certain properties are essential to the kind or species of the object in question.

== See also ==
- Slingshot argument
