= Peter Simons (academic) =

British retired philosopher and academic (born 1950)

Peter Simons FBA
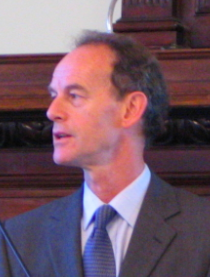
- Simons in 2008
- Born: 23 March 1950 (age 76)

Education
- Doctoral advisor: Wolfe Mays

Philosophical work
- Era: Contemporary philosophy
- Region: Western philosophy
- School: Analytic philosophy
- Main interests: Epistemology; Ontology
- Notable ideas: Truthmaker theory

Peter Murray Simons, FBA (born 23 March 1950) is a British retired philosopher and academic. From 2009 to 2016, he was Professor of Moral Philosophy at Trinity College Dublin, where he is now professor emeritus. He is known for his work with Kevin Mulligan and Barry Smith on metaphysics and the history of Austrian philosophy, and has been visiting professor at the University of Italian Switzerland since 2018.

== Biography ==
Simons studied Mathematics and Philosophy at the University of Manchester, having been supervised by Wolfe Mays. While at Manchester he co-founded the seminar for Austro-German philosophy. He held teaching posts at the University of Bolton, from which he holds an honorary doctorate, the University of Salzburg, where he is Honorary Professor of Philosophy, and the University of Leeds. He has been President of the European Society for Analytic Philosophy and is current director of the Franz Brentano Foundation.

His research interests include metaphysics and ontology, the history of logic, the history of Central European Philosophy (particularly in Austria and Poland in the 19th and 20th centuries), and the application of metaphysics to engineering and other non-philosophical disciplines. He is the author or co-author of five books and over 290 articles.

He is married with two children.

== Awards ==
- FBA: Fellow of the British Academy (elected July 2004)
- Member of Academia Europaea (elected 2006)
- Professorial Fellowship of Trinity College Dublin (elected 2010)
- Member of the Royal Irish Academy (elected 2013)
- Foreign Member of the Polish Academy of Sciences (elected 2018)

== Publications ==
- Parts: A Study In Ontology, Oxford: Clarendon Press, 1987.
- Philosophy and Logic in Central Europe from Bolzano to Tarski. Selected Essays, Dordrecht: Kluwer, 1992.
