= Lawn (surname) =

Lawn is a surname. Notable people with the surname include:

- Chris Lawn (born 1972), former Gaelic footballer
- Chris Lawn (philosopher), Irish philosopher
- Connie Lawn (1944–2018), American journalist and White House correspondent
- Edward Lawn (1879–1961), Canadian politician and merchant
- Jim Lawn (1902–1972), Australian rules footballer
- Joanna Lawn (born 1973), New Zealand ironman triathlete
- John C. Lawn (born 1935), American former police officer and FBI agent, 4th Administrator of the Drug Enforcement Administration
- John J. Lawn, American politician elected in 2011
- John Lawn (miner) (1840–1905), New Zealand gold miner and mine manager
- Lewis Lawn (1929–1980), New Zealand weightlifter
- Mark Lawn (born 1960), former co-chairman of Bradford City Association Football Club
- Philip Lawn, Australian professor of economics
- Sam Lawn (1906–1971), Australian politician
