= Wilhelmus Luijpen =

Dutch philosopher

Wilhelmus Antonius Maria "Nico" Luijpen, OSA (22 May 1922, Hilversum – 29 September 1980, Eindhoven) was a Dutch philosopher and Catholic priest of the Order of St. Augustine. An existential phenomenologist, Luijpen's works greatly contributed to the spread of Existentialism and phenomenology in Catholic intellectual circles in Europe and in the United States, having influenced generations of Catholic philosophers and theologians.

Having studied at Rome, Paris, Leuven and Fribourg, his intellectual and philosophical formation moved away from Neo-Scholasticism to Existential phenomenology through his study of contemporary Continental thinkers like Martin Heidegger, Maurice Merleau-Ponty, Gabriel Marcel and Jean-Paul Sartre as well as Leuven philosophers like Alphonse de Waelhens and Albert Dondeyne.
