= Anna-Teresa Tymieniecka =

Polish-American philosopher (1923–2014)

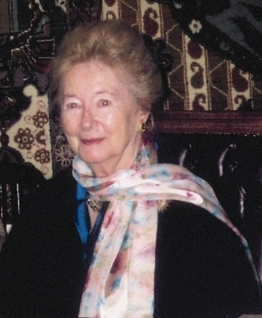
- Born: February 28, 1923; Marianowo, Mazovia, Poland
- Died: June 7, 2014 (aged 91); Hanover, New Hampshire, U.S.

Education
- Education: Jagiellonian University

Philosophical work
- Era: Contemporary philosophy
- Region: Western philosophy
- School: Phenomenology
- Institutions: Oregon State College; Pennsylvania State University; Radcliffe College; St. John's University
- Main interests: Epistemology, ontology, aesthetics
- Notable ideas: Phenomenology of cosmic creation

Anna-Teresa Tymieniecka (Polish: [tɨmʲɛˈɲɛt͡ska]; February 28, 1923 – June 7, 2014) was a Polish philosopher, phenomenologist, founder and president of the World Phenomenology Institute, and editor (from its inception in the late 1960s) of the book series, Analecta Husserliana. She had a thirty-two-year friendship and occasional academic collaboration with Pope John Paul II.

== Biography ==
=== Education and teaching career ===
Anna-Teresa Tymieniecka was born into a noble Polish-Jewish family. She was daughter of Władysław Tymieniecki and Maria Ludwika Loewenstein. Her acquaintance with philosophy started at an early age with reading of the fundamental work of Kazimierz Twardowski, the founder of the Lwów–Warsaw Philosophical School, Zur Lehre vom Inhalt und Gegenstand der Vorstellungen (On the content and object of presentations), as well as works by Plato and Bergson. To the philosophy of the latter she was introduced by her mother, Maria-Ludwika de Lanval Tymieniecka.

After the end of World War II she began systematic studies of philosophy at the Jagiellonian University in Kraków under the guidance of Roman Ingarden, student of the famous teachers Kazimierz Twardowski and Edmund Husserl. Simultaneously she studied at the Kraków Academy of Fine Arts.

After completing the entire university course within two years she moved to Switzerland to continue studies under another important Polish philosopher and logician, Józef Maria Bocheński, at the University of Fribourg. Her doctoral study, dedicated to explorations of the fundamentals of phenomenology in Nicolai Hartmann and Roman Ingarden's philosophies, was later published as "Essence and Existence" (1957). She obtained her second Ph.D., this time in French philosophy and literature, at the Sorbonne in 1951.

In the years 1952–1953 she did postdoctoral researches in the field of social and political sciences at the College d'Europe in Brugge, Belgium. From that moment on Tymieniecka started her own way in philosophy by developing a special phenomenological attitude that was neither entirely Husserlian, nor entirely Ingardenian.

Her first husband was the Kraków art painter Leszek Dutka (1921–2014). In 1956 she married Hendrik S. Houthakker (1924–2008), Professor of Economy at Stanford University (1954–1960) and Harvard University (from 1960) and member of President Nixon's Council of Economic Advisers from 1969 to 1971.

In 1979 she published, in collaboration with Karol Wojtyła, who had become Pope John Paul II in 1978, an English translation of Wojtyla's book "Osoba i czyn" (Person and Act). Person and Act, one of Pope John Paul II's foremost literary works, was initially written in Polish; it has been translated into French, Italian, German, Spanish, English and other languages. Tymieniecka's English translation is widely criticized. Critics of this work claim that Tymieniecka "changed the Polish translation, confusing its technical language and bending the text to her own philosophical concerns." It is also said that John Paul II did not agree with this translation. Besides, it was published before the definitive edition of the Polish version, which shows that it was not the final version that the author desired. Her critics suggest that the English title used by Tymieniecka, "The Acting Person" is indicative of the problems involved with the work, as the author's title was meant to convey the tension between subjective consciousness (person) and objective reality (act), an idea central to the written work and the message the author tried to convey. Despite widespread disagreement, Tymieniecka insisted in 2001 that her work is the "definitive" English edition of "Osoba i czyn".

She served as assistant professor in mathematics at the Oregon State College (1955–1956) and assistant professor at the Pennsylvania State University (from 1957). She spent the years 1961–1966 at the Institute for Independent Study at Radcliffe College. In 1972–1973 she was Professor of Philosophy at St. John's University.

=== Relationship with Pope John Paul II ===
Tymieniecka and Wojtyla, later Pope John Paul II, began a friendship in 1973 while he was the archbishop of Kraków. The friendship lasted thirty-two years until his death. She served as his host when he visited New England in 1976, and photos show them together on skiing and camping trips. Letters that he wrote to her were part of a collection of documents sold by Tymieniecka's estate in 2008 to the National Library of Poland. According to the BBC the library had initially kept the letters from public view, partly because of John Paul's path to sainthood, but a library official announced in February 2016 the letters would be made public. In February 2016 the BBC documentary programme Panorama 'revealed' that John Paul II had had a close relationship with Polish-born philosopher Tymieniecka. The pair exchanged personal letters over 30 years, and Stourton believes that in some of these Tymieniecka had told Wojtyła that she loved him. The Vatican described the documentary as "more smoke than fire", and Tymieniecka had earlier denied being involved with John Paul II. Writers Carl Bernstein, the veteran investigative journalist of the Watergate scandal, and Vatican expert Marco Politi, were the first journalists to talk to Anna-Teresa Tymieniecka in the 1990s about her importance in John Paul's life. They interviewed her and dedicated 20 pages to her in their 1996 book His Holiness. Bernstein and Politi even asked her if she had ever developed any romantic relationship with John Paul II, "however one-sided it might have been." She responded, "No, I never fell in love with the cardinal. How could I fall in love with a middle-aged clergyman? Besides, I'm a married woman." The secret letters of Pope John Paul programme was aired on UK's BBC One on Monday, 15 February 2016, at 20:30.

== Foundation of phenomenological societies ==
In 1969 Tymieniecka founded the 'International Husserl and Phenomenological Research Society', in 1974 the 'International Society for Phenomenology and Literature', in 1976 the 'International Society for Phenomenology and the Human Sciences', in 1993 the 'International Society of Phenomenology, Aesthetics, and Fine Arts' (1993) and in 1995 the 'Sociedad Ibero-Americana de Fenomenologia'. The first three societies comprised the foundation for creation of the World Institute for Advanced Phenomenological Research and Learning in 1976, reorganized later into the World Phenomenology Institute. The initiative to establish this institute was supported by Roman Ingarden, Emmanuel Levinas, Paul Ricoeur, and Hans-Georg Gadamer as well as by the Director of the Husserl-Archives in Leuven, Herman Leo Van Breda. Since its foundation and for many years Anna-Teresa Tymieniecka remained its permanent President.

As the president of the 'World Phenomenology Institute' she organized numerous phenomenological congresses, conferences and symposia.

== Analecta Husserliana ==
Since its creation in 1968, although the first book of the series seems to have formally appeared only in 1971, Tymieniecka was the editor of the book series Analecta Husserliana: The Yearbook of Phenomenological Research, which aims to develop and disseminate Edmund Husserl's ideas and phenomenological approach. The series was created as a continuation of Jahrbuch für Philosophie und Phänomenologische Forschung edited by Husserl himself (main themes: the human being and the human life condition). As of 2022, the Analecta Husserliana series is being published by Springer Publishing and contains 125 volumes. The last volume to bear Tymieniecka's name as editor was Vol. CXIX The Cosmos and the Creative Imagination, which was published in 2018.

In addition to Analecta Husserliana, The World Phenomenology Institute publishes the journal Phenomenological Inquiry, and Anna-Teresa Tymieniecka acted also as Editor of the Springer (formerly Kluwer Academic Publishers) book series: Islamic Philosophy and Occidental Phenomenology in Dialogue, with co-Editors Gholamreza Aavani and the Lebanese/British philosopher Nader El-Bizri.

== Selected bibliography ==
- Tymieniecka, A.-T. Essence et existence: Étude à propos de la philosophie de Roman Ingarden et Nicolai Hartmann (Paris: Aubier, Editions Montaigne, 1957).
- Tymieniecka, A.-T. For Roman Ingarden; nine essays in phenomenology ('s-Gravenhage: M.Nijhoff, 1959), viii + 179 p.
- Tymieniecka, A.-T. Phenomenology and science in contemporary European thought. With a foreword by I. M. Bochenski ([New York]: Farrar, Straus and Cudahy, 1962), xxii + 198 p.
- Tymieniecka, A.-T. Leibniz' cosmological synthesis (Assen: Van Gorcum, 1964), 207 p.
- Tymieniecka, A.-T. Why is there something rather than nothing? Prolegomena to the phenomenology of cosmic creation (Assen: Van Gorcum & Comp., 1966), 168 p.
- Tymieniecka, A.-T. Eros et Logos (Paris: Beatrice-Nauwelaerts, 1972), 127 p.
- Tymieniecka, A.-T. Logos and Life (Dordrecht; Boston: Kluwer Academic, 1987–2000, 4 vols.).

== See also ==
- American philosophy
- List of American philosophers
