= Society for Phenomenology and Existential Philosophy =

The Society for Phenomenology and Existential Philosophy (SPEP) is a philosophical society whose initial purpose was to promote the study of phenomenology and existentialism but has since expanded to a wide array of contemporary philosophical pursuits, including critical theory, feminist philosophy, poststructuralism, critical race theory, and increasingly non-Eurocentric philosophies. SPEP was created in 1962 by American philosophers who were interested in Continental philosophy and were dissatisfied with the analytic dominance of the American Philosophical Association. It has since emerged as the second most important philosophical society in the United States. Antonio Calcagno and Shannon Mussett are the current Executive Co-Directors of SPEP.

== History ==
SPEP's first annual meeting was at Northwestern University in 1962, during which "a handful or two of phenomenologists, existentialists, and iconoclasts gathered." Selected papers from these meetings have been published by several publishers since 1965. Now with a membership of over 2,500, SPEP has grown to be one of the largest philosophical societies in North America.

As an acronym for Studies in Phenomenology and Existential Philosophy, "SPEP" also denotes a series of scholarly monographs and translations founded by James M. Edie and published by Northwestern University Press since the early 1960s, including works by Maurice Merleau-Ponty, Paul Ricoeur, and Edmund Husserl. The current series editor is Anthony Steinbock.

== See also ==
- British Society for Phenomenology
- Existential phenomenology
- World Phenomenology Institute
