= Niall Keane =

Irish philosopher

Education
- Education: KU Leuven (PhD), University of Limerick (MA)
- Thesis: On What Remains Concealed: Heidegger's Plato and Man's Comportment Towards the Hidden (2009)
- Doctoral advisor: Rudolf Bernet

Philosophical work
- Era: 21st-century philosophy
- Region: Western philosophy
- Institutions: University of the West of England, University of Limerick
- Main interests: hermeneutics

Niall Keane is an Irish philosopher and senior lecturer in philosophy at the University of the West of England. Previously he taught at the University of Limerick, Ireland. Keane is known for his works on Gadamer's thought and hermeneutics.

== Books ==
- The Gadamer Dictionary, with Chris Lawn, A&C Black. 2011
- The Blackwell Companion to Hermeneutics, edited with Chris Lawn, Wiley-Blackwell. 2015
- A Companion to Hermeneutics, edited with Chris Lawn, Wiley-Blackwell. 2015
- Mauro Carbone, An Unprecedented Deformation: Marcel Proust and the Sensible Ideas, Niall Keane (tr.), SUNY Press, 2010.
- Donatella Ester Di Cesare, Utopia of Understanding: Between Babel and Auschwitz, Niall Keane (tr.), SUNY Press, 2013.
- Donatella Di Cesare, Gadamer: A Philosophical Portrait, Niall Keane (tr.), Indiana University Press, 2013.
