= David Koepsell =

American philosopher, attorney, and educator

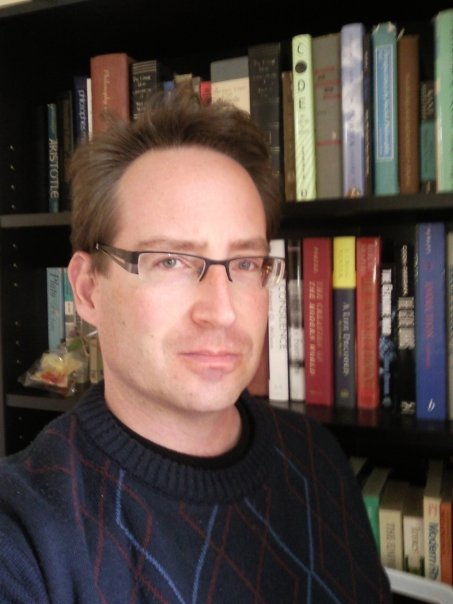
- Born: David Richard Koepsell; 1969 (age 56–57); New York, U.S.
- Occupations: Author, teacher, attorney

David Richard Koepsell (born 1969) is an American author, philosopher, attorney, and educator whose recent research focuses on how ethics and public policy deal with emerging science and technology. He has been a practicing attorney, been employed as an ontologist, been a university professor, and has lectured worldwide. He was a visiting professor of research ethics at National Autonomous University of Mexico, director of research and strategic initiatives at Comisión Nacional de Bioética (CONBIOETICA) Mexico, an adjunct professor at University at Buffalo and a senior fellow and education director of the Center for Inquiry Transnational, based in Amherst, New York. Currently, he is an instructional assistant professor at Texas A&M University.

== Career ==
Koepsell earned his PhD in philosophy (1997) as well as his doctorate in law (1995) from the University at Buffalo, where he studied with Barry Smith. Koepsell currently serves as an adjunct professor in the Department of Learning and Instruction, the University at Buffalo. He has lectured worldwide on issues ranging from civil rights, philosophy, science, ontology, intellectual property theory, society, and religion. Koepsell was appointed assistant professor of philosophy at TU Delft in September 2008 and was promoted to associate professor in September 2013. He is an associate editor of Free Inquiry magazine. He is the co-founder, with Edward Summer, of Carefully Considered Productions, an educational media not-for-profit corporation. He is also the co-founder of Encrypgen. Koepsell also serves on the advisory board of the Center for the Study of Innovative Freedom. He joined the software startup spin-off from ConsenSys, ConsenSys Health as General Counsel and Chief Ethics & Compliance Officer in March, 2020.

== Major theses ==
In stark contrast to the work of Michael R. Heim, who has promoted a Platonic dualism in his discussions of cyberspace and virtual reality, Koepsell has argued for a Searlean realism about all expression. Cyberspatial entities are expressions of the same type as any other intentionally produced, man-made object. Koepsell's work uses legal ontology and common sense ontology to examine social objects. In the process, Koepsell criticized the distinction between patentable and copyrightable objects as artificial, and argued for an open-source approach to all intellectual property.

Koepsell's research interests have focused on the nexus of ethics, law, and science. Specifically, while at Yale as a visiting fellow (2006–2007), he investigated ethical questions involved in the practice of bioprospecting and patenting elements of the human genome. Koepsell argues that there are two forms of commons, fiat and natural, otherwise called "commons by choice" and "commons by logical necessity." He has recently argued that DNA, like radio spectra, sunlight, and air, falls into the category "commons by logical necessity", and that attempts to own genes by patent are unjust. His book on the subject, entitled Who Owns You, was published by Wiley-Blackwell in March 2009. While it was endorsed by Nobel Prize winner John Sulston as a "lucid and compelling deconstruction of current practice in the patenting of human genes, exposing inherent contradictions in the process and offering practical ways to resolve them", a starkly contrasting review of Who Owns You? has also been published. In an interview for Singularity University, he applauded the court decision in the Myriad Genetics case that "a naturally occurring DNA segment is a product of nature and not patent eligible merely because it has been isolated", while manipulation of a gene to create something not found in nature could still be eligible for patent protection.

Regarding the intersection of religion with politics and public policy, Koepsell wrote an article for the Secular Humanist Bulletin titled "The United States Is Not a Christian Nation". More recently the Los Angeles Times quoted him as saying "I think [Benjamin Franklin] would have been dismayed by religious fundamentalism in government. He was a free thinker about many things and at least a skeptic about the afterlife and the divinity of Jesus. He was a scientist, a man of letters and a man of Earth."

== Published books ==
- 2017 Philosophy and Breaking Bad co-edited with Kevin Decker and Robert Arp (UK: Palgrave Macmillan) ISBN 978-3-319-40665-7
- 2016 Scientific Integrity and Research Ethics: an Approach from the Ethos of Science (The Netherlands: Springer) ISBN 978-3-319-51276-1
- 2015 Etica de la Investigacion, Integridad Cientifica (Mexico City: CONACyT) ISBN 978-607-460-506-8
- 2015 Who Owns You: Science, Innovation, and the Gene Patent Wars, 2d Edition (revised and expanded) (UK: Wiley) ISBN 978-1118948507
- 2015 Bioethics: Inspire the Future to Move the World, co-edited with Manuel Ruiz de Chavez Guerrero and Raul Jimenez ISBN 978-607-460-475-7
- 2012 Breaking Bad and Philosophy, with Robert Arp, (ed.) Popular Culture and Philosophy series (Chicago: Open Court) ISBN 978-0812697643
- 2011 Innovation and Nanotechnology: Converging Technologies and the End of Intellectual Property (UK: Bloomsbury Academic) ISBN 978-1849663434
- 2009 Who Owns You? The Corporate Gold Rush to Patent Your Genes (UK: Wiley-Blackwell) ISBN 978-1405187305 (Note: Reviews include: Steven Poole, non-fiction choice, The Guardian, Oct., 17, 2009; C.H. Blake, Choice Reviews Online, Dec 2009; Molly C. Kottemann, in Yale Journal of Biology and Medicine, Dec 2009, Vol 82, No. 4, pp. 233-34; Kristien Hens, Center for Biomedical Ethics and Law, in Ethical Perspectives Vol 17, Issue 1, p. 124, March 2010; Daniel Puente-Rodríguez, in Asian Biotechnology and Development Review Vol. 13, Issue 1, March, 2011; Randall Mayes, Journal of Evolution and Technology, Dec. 20, 2009, Vol. 20, Issue 2; Christian Jongerneel, in De Ingenieur, 21 Augustus 2009, 12; Cheryl Lajos in The Librarian's Review of Books; John Portnow, in Journal of High Technology Law, 2009-2010; Leo Uzych, J.D., M.P.H, in Metapsychology Online Reviews, Vol.14, Issue15; Aaron Fellmeth, in Journal of Bioethical Inquiry 2009.25.10)
- 2007 Science and Ethics: Can Science Help Us Make Wise and Moral Judgments? Co-edited with Paul Kurtz (Amherst, NY: Prometheus Press) ISBN 978-1591025375
- 2003 John Searle's Ideas About Social Reality: Extensions, Criticisms, and Reconstructions, co-edited with Laurence Moss (Oxford UK: Blackwell) ISBN 978-1405112581 (Note: Review by Elizabeth McCardell, in Metapsychology Online Reviews, Mar 17th 2004 (Volume 8, Issue 12))
- 2002 Reboot World (New York: Writer's Club Press) (fiction)
- 2000 The Ontology of Cyberspace (Chicago: Open Court) (Note: Reviews include: Rita F. Lin, in Harvard Journal of Law and Technology Vol. 14, No. 1 (2000), pp.335-344; Thomas V. Finnerty, in Journal of High Technology Law (2005); Christopher C. Robinson, "Democracy in Cyberia," in Theory and Event Vol 5, Issue 3; Arthur L. Morin, Resource Center for Cyberculture Studies (2002); Terence P. Ross, "Children of the Revolution: The Developing Genre of Cyberlaw Commentary", in 4 Green Bag 2d, p.453 et seq. (2001))

== See also ==
- American philosophy
- List of American philosophers
