= European Society for Analytic Philosophy =

Society for collaboration among European philosophers

The European Society for Analytic Philosophy (ESAP) is a philosophical organization founded by Kevin Mulligan, Barry Smith, Peter Simons, Pierre Jacob, Diego Marconi, François Recanati, Marco Santambrogio, Andreas Kemmerling and Pascal Engel in 1991.

== History ==
The founders of ESAP's project was to bring together analytic philosophers from all over Europe in one society furthering inter-European contacts, connections, and collaboration.

ESAP's first president was François Recanati. He organized the first European Congress for Analytic Philosophy (ECAP) in 1993 in Aix-en-Provence. ESAP chasorganizing events in many of the great cities of Europe: Peter Simons organized ECAP2 in Leeds (1996), Nenad Miscevic ECAP3 in Maribor (1999), Wlodek Rabinowicz ECAP4 in Lund (2002), João Branquino ECAP5 in Lisbon (2005), Jan Wolenski ECAP6 in Cracow (2008), Michele di Francesco ECAP7 in Milan (2011), Mircea Dumitru ECAP8 in Bucharest (2013). In 2017, ECAP9 will be held at LMU Munich, organized by ESAP's current president, Stephan Hartmann. During the presidency of Peter Simons, the journal Dialectica became the official journal of ESAP. As early as in 1997, the first website of ESAP was set up by Božidar Kante. It was renewed by Carlo Penco in 1999 and maintained by him till 2015.
