= World Phenomenology Institute =

The World Phenomenology Institute (WPI, originally named the World Institute for Advanced Phenomenological Research and Learning) is an academic organization founded in 1976 to promote scholarship in the area of phenomenology. The organisation was founded by Anna-Teresa Tymieniecka.

== See also ==
- Society for Phenomenology and Existential Philosophy
- British Society for Phenomenology
- Phenomenology (philosophy)
- Existential phenomenology
- Edmund Husserl
- Edith Stein
- Martin Heidegger
- Maurice Merleau-Ponty
- Jean-Paul Sartre
- Paul Ricoeur
- Emmanuel Levinas
- Jacques Derrida
