= Daryl Hine =

Canadian poet and translator (1936–2012)

- Born: William Daryl Hine; February 24, 1936; Burnaby, British Columbia, Canada
- Died: August 20, 2012 (aged 76); Evanston, Illinois, United States
- Occupation: Poet • Translator
- Partner: Samuel Todes
- Writing career
- Language: English

William Daryl Hine (February 24, 1936 – August 20, 2012) was a Canadian poet and translator. A MacArthur Fellow for the class of 1986, Hine was the editor of Poetry from 1968 to 1978. He graduated from McGill University in 1958 and then studied in Europe, as a Canada Council scholar. He earned a PhD. in comparative literature at the University of Chicago (UChicago) in 1967. During his career, Hine taught at UChicago, the University of Illinois at Chicago, and Northwestern University.

== Life ==
Hine was born in Burnaby in 1936 and grew up in New Westminster, British Columbia. He was the adopted son of Robert Fraser and Elsie James Hine. He attended McGill University in Montreal 1954–1958. His first chapbook, The Carnal and the Crane, was published as part of Louis Dudek's McGill Poetry Series in 1957.

Hine then went to Europe on a Canada Council scholarship, where he lived for the next three years. He moved to New York in 1962 and to Chicago in 1963, taking a PhD in Comparative Literature at the University of Chicago in 1967. He taught there and at Northwestern University and at University of Illinois (Chicago campus) during the following decades, while he served as an editor. Editor of Poetry magazine, from 1968 to 1978, his correspondence from that time is held at Indiana University. He was awarded a MacArthur Fellowship in 1986.

Hine's work appeared in the New York Review of Books, Harper's, The New Yorker, The Tamarack Review, and The Paris Review.

The poet first came out as gay in his 1975 work In & Out, which was initially available only in a privately printed version in limited circulation. The work did not gain general publication until 1989.

Following the death of his partner of more than 30 years, the philosopher Samuel Todes, Hine lived in semi-retirement in Evanston, Illinois. Hine died of complications of a blood disorder on August 20, 2012, at the age of 76.

== Awards ==
- 2005 Harold Morton Landon Translation Award
- 1986 MacArthur Foundation Fellow
- 1980 Guggenheim Fellowship

== Works ==
- The Prince of Darkness & Co. Abelard-Schuman. 1961. (novel)
- Polish Subtitles: Impressions from a Journey. Abelard-Schuman. 1962. (nonfiction)
- Daryl Hine, Joseph Parisi, ed. (1978). The "Poetry" Anthology, 1912-1977. Houghton Mifflin Company. ISBN 978-0-395-26548-2.

=== Poetry ===
- Five Poems. Emblem Books. 1955.
- The Carnal and the Crane. Contact Press. 1957.
- The Devil's Picture Book. Abelard. 1960.
- Heroics: Five Poems. France: Grosswiller. 1961.
- The Wooden Horse. Atheneum. 1965.
- Minutes. Atheneum. 1968.
- Resident Alien. Atheneum. 1975. ISBN 978-0-689-10651-4.
- In and Out. Knopf. 1989. (privately printed, 1975)
- Daylight Saving. Atheneum. 1978.
- Selected Poems. Toronto: Oxford University Press. 1980. ISBN 978-0-689-11118-1. {Atheneum, 1981}
- Arrondissements. Erin: The Porcupine's Quill. 1989. ISBN 0-88984-130-6.
- Academic Festival Overtures. Atheneum. 1985. ISBN 978-0-689-11573-8.
- Postscripts. Random House. 1990. ISBN 978-0-394-58836-0. (Knopf (New York, NY), 1991)
- Recollected Poems: 1951-2004. Fitzhenry & Whiteside. 2007. ISBN 978-1-55455-021-0.
- &: A Serial Poem. Fitzhenry & Whiteside. 2010. ISBN 978-1-55455-164-4.
- A Reliquary and Other Poems. Fitzhenry & Whiteside. 2013.
- The Essential Daryl Hine. The Porcupine's Quill. 2015.

=== Plays ===
- A Mutual Flame (radio play), BBC, 1961.
- The Death of Seneca, produced in Chicago, 1968.
- Alcestis (radio play), BBC, 1972.

=== Translations ===
- The Homeric Hymns and the Battle of the Frogs and Mice. Atheneum. 1972.
- Heinrich Heine (1981). Selected Poems. Atheneum.
- (And author of commentary) Theocritus: Idylls and Epigrams, Atheneum, 1982.
- Ovid's Heroines: A Verse Translation of the Heroides. Yale University Press. 1991. ISBN 978-0-300-05093-6.
- Puerilities: Erotic Epigrams of The Greek Anthology. Princeton University Press. 2001. ISBN 978-0-691-08820-4.
- Hesiod (2005). Works of Hesiod and the Homeric hymns. Translator Daryl Hine. University of Chicago Press. ISBN 978-0-226-32965-9.
