= Wolfe Mays =

British philosopher (1912–2005)

- Born: 1912
- Died: 21 January 2005 (aged 92–93)

Education
- Education: University of Cambridge (Ph.D.)

Philosophical work
- Era: Contemporary philosophy
- Region: Western philosophy
- School: Continental; Phenomenology
- Institutions: University of Manchester
- Doctoral students: Kevin Mulligan, Peter Simons, Barry Smith
- Main interests: Epistemology, ontology
- Notable ideas: Bridging analytic philosophy and phenomenology

Wolfe Mays (/meɪz/; 1912 – 21 January 2005) was a British philosopher. He was the founder of British Society for Phenomenology and the editor of its journal. Mays is known for his efforts for introducing phenomenology in England.

He studied at Cambridge University, where he attended the lectures of Ludwig Wittgenstein. He taught at the University of Manchester from 1946 until his retirement in 1979. His students included Kevin Mulligan, Peter Simons, and Barry Smith.
