= Kevin Mulligan =

British philosopher (born 1951)

- Born: 23 June 1951 (age 75); Shifnal, Shropshire, England

Education
- Doctoral advisor: Wolfe Mays

Philosophical work
- Era: Contemporary philosophy
- Region: Western philosophy
- School: Analytic philosophy
- Main interests: Philosophy of language, philosophy of mind, epistemology, ontology, philosophy of emotions, logic
- Notable ideas: Truthmaker theory

Kevin Mulligan (born 23 June 1951) is a British philosopher, working on ontology, the philosophy of mind, and Austrian philosophy. He is currently Honorary Professor at the University of Geneva, Full Professor at the University of Italian Switzerland, Director of Research at the Institute of Philosophy of Lugano, and member of the Academia Europaea and of the Royal Swedish Academy of Letters. He is also known for his work with Peter Simons and Barry Smith on metaphysics and the history of Austrian philosophy.

A major Festschrift on his work was published in 2014.

Since 2016 he is academic director and professor at the Università della Svizzera italiana in Switzerland.

== Bibliography ==
- Kevin Mulligan Bibliography
- Kevin Mulligan Recent Publications
- Kevin Mulligan, Peter Simons and Barry Smith, "What's Wrong with Contemporary Philosophy?", Topoi, 25 (1-2), 2006, 63–67.
- Anatomie della stoltezza. Jouvence, 2016. ISBN 978-88-7801-547-0
- Wittgenstein et la philosophie austro-allemande. Vrin, 2012. ISBN 978-2-7116-2460-7
  - Italian translation: Wittgenstein e la filosofia austro-tedesca. Mimesis, 2014. ISBN 978-8-857-52307-1
  - Spanish translation: Wittgenstein y la filosofia austro-alemana. Tecnos, 2014. ISBN 978-8-4309-6278-5
- Décrire. La Psychologie de Brentano (with Olivier Massin), Paris : Vrin, 2021. ISBN 9782711630059

== Edited volumes ==
- Speech Act and Sachverhalt: Reinach and the Foundations of Realist Phenomenology, Dordrecht: Nijhoff, 1987. ISBN 978-90-247-3427-6
- Mind, Meaning and Metaphysics: The Philosophy and Theory of Language of Anton Marty, Dordrecht: Kluwer, 1990. ISBN 978-0-7923-0578-1
- Language, Truth and Ontology, Dordrecht: Kluwer, 1991 ISBN 978-0-7923-1509-4
- Wittgenstein analysé (ed. with J‑P. Leyvraz), Paris: Editions Jacqueline Chambon, 1993 ISBN 978-2-8771-1087-7
- Regards sur Bentham et l'utilitarisme (ed. with R. Roth), Geneva: Droz, 1993 ISBN 978-2-600-04360-1
- Themes from Wittgenstein (ed. with B. Garrett), Working Papers in Philosophy, 4, Australian National University, Canberra, 1993.
- La Philosophie autrichienne de Bolzano à Musil. Histoire et Actualité (ed. with J.-P. Cometti), Paris: Vrin, 2001. ISBN 978-2-7116-1497-4
- Les nationalismes (ed. with B. Baertschi), Paris: Presses Universitaires de France. 2001 ISBN 978-2-1305-2396-3

- Romanian translation: Nationalismele, Bucharest: Nemira, 2010 ISBN 978-6065790353

- Relations and Predicates: Philosophical Analysis (ed. with H. Hochberg), Frankfurt: Ontos Verlag, 2004 ISBN 978-3110326536
- Robert Musil – Ironie, Satire, falsche Gefühle (ed. with A. Westerhoff), Paderborn: mentis Verlag, 2009. ISBN 978-3-89785-663-9
- Studies in the History and Philosophy of Polish Logic. Essays in Honour of Jan Woleński (ed. with K. Kijania-Placek & T. Placek), Palgrave Macmillan, 2013. ISBN 978-1-137-03090-0

== See also ==
- European Society for Analytic Philosophy
