= Lawns, West Yorkshire =

Suburb of Wakefield, England

Coordinates: 53.71776°N 1.52265°W

Lawns is a district of Wakefield in West Yorkshire, England.

Neighbouring settlements are Carr Gate in the south, Outwood in the east, and East Ardsley in the northwest. Wakefield 41 Business Park is situated between Lawns and Outwood. Nearby is junction 41 of the M1 motorway between Wakefield and Leeds.
