= Samuel Todes =

American philosopher (1927–1994)

- Born: June 27, 1927
- Died: October 21, 1994 (aged 67)
- Partner: Daryl Hine

Education
- Education: Harvard University
- Thesis: The Human Body as Material Subject of the World (1963)

Philosophical work
- Era: Contemporary philosophy
- Region: Western philosophy
- School: Phenomenology
- Institutions: MIT, Northwestern University
- Main interests: Philosophy of mind
- Notable works: Body and World

Samuel Todes (June 27, 1927 – October 21, 1994) was an American philosopher who made notable contributions to existentialism, phenomenology, and philosophy of mind.

== Biography ==
Todes taught philosophy at MIT after graduating from Harvard, alongside Hubert Dreyfus. He taught courses on Kant, Hegel, Husserl, Heidegger and Merleau-Ponty. Todes developed a philosophy of needs, based on his critique of Kant's schematism and Merleau-Ponty's critique of Heidegger. This contribution was never published, beyond its basis in his dissertation. Gerry Stahl and Ralph D. Sawyer attended his courses as undergraduates. When Todes and Dreyfus were dismissed from MIT for their critique of artificial intelligence, Todes moved to Northwestern University's Department of Philosophy.

Todes was an associate professor of philosophy at Northwestern University at the time of his death in 1994. His Harvard University doctoral dissertation, The Human Body as Material Subject of the World, written in 1963, was chosen as one of the most important philosophy dissertations at Harvard and thus published close to three decades later in a special dissertation-series of publications, connected with Harvard itself, using Todes' original title. It gained such a following therefrom that it was published again in 2001 as Body and World (MIT Press).

According to philosopher Piotr Hoffman, "Had [Todes' dissertation] been published at the time it was written, it would have been recognized as one of the most valuable contributions to philosophy in the postwar period and as the most significant contribution to the field of existential phenomenology since the work of Merleau-Ponty."

Body and World also makes a notable contribution to contemporary interdisciplinary research in the field of embodied cognitive science.

In addition to his important philosophical work, Todes was a pioneer in the struggle for gay rights and visibility in the academic world; openly gay himself, he was among the founding members of the Gay Academic Union. His life partner of over 30 years was the distinguished Canadian-American poet and translator Daryl Hine (1936–2012).

== See also ==
- Hubert Dreyfus
- American philosophy
- List of American philosophers
