= Ullrich Haase =

British philosopher

Ullrich Michael Haase
- Born: 1962 (age 63–64)

Education
- Education: University of Essex (PhD)

Philosophical work
- Era: 21st-century philosophy
- Region: Western philosophy
- School: Continental
- Institutions: Manchester Metropolitan University

Ullrich Michael Haase SFHEA (born 1962) is a German born philosopher and Principal Lecturer in Philosophy at Manchester Metropolitan University. He is a Senior Fellow of the Higher Education Academy and the Managing Editor of the Journal of the British Society for Phenomenology. Haase is known for his expertise on the philosophy of Friedrich Nietzsche.

== Books ==
- Starting with Nietzsche, Continuum, 2009
- Maurice Blanchot, with William Large, Psychology Press, 2001
