= Tode =

Tode may refer to:

== People ==
- Arne Tode (born 1985), German motorcycle racer
- Hans-Jürgen Tode (born 1957), East German sprint canoer

== Other uses ==
- Tōde, an Okinawan martial art
- Tode Station, a train station in Fukuyama, Hiroshima Prefecture, Japan
- Tropospheric ozone depletion events (TODE)

== See also ==
- Toad (disambiguation)
