= ISO/IEC 21838 =

ISO standard for top-level ontologies

ISO/IEC 21838 is a multi-part standard published by the International Organization for Standardization (ISO) and the International Electrotechnical Commission (IEC) in 2021, which outlines requirements for top-level ontology development and describes several top-level ontologies that satisfy those requirements, including Basic Formal Ontology (BFO), Descriptive Ontology for Linguistic and Cognitive Engineering (DOLCE), and TUpper. ISO/IEC 21838 is intended to promote interoperability among lower level, domain-specific ontologies, and to foster coherent ontology design, for example, through the coordinated re-engineering of legacy ontologies which have been developed using heterogeneous top-level categories.

== Background ==
ISO/IEC 21838 was developed by Subcommittee 32 for Data Management and Interchange, of the ISO and IEC Joint Technical Committee 1 for Information Technology. The standard consists thus far of four parts:

- ISO/IEC 21838-1:2021 Information technology - Top-level ontologies (TLO) - Part 1: Requirements, which describes characteristics required of domain-neutral top-level ontologies for use with lower-level domain ontologies to support data exchange, retrieval, discovery, integration and analysis.
- ISO/IEC 21838-2:2021 Information technology - Top-level ontologies (TLO) - Part 2: Basic Formal Ontology (BFO) describes Basic Formal Ontology (BFO), as an ontology conformant to the requirements specified in ISO/IEC 21838-1.
- ISO/IEC 21838-3:2023 Information Technology - Top-level ontologies (TLO) - Part 3: Descriptive ontology for linguistic and cognitive engineering (DOLCE) describes Descriptive Ontology for Linguistic and Cognitive Engineering (DOLCE), as an ontology conformant to the requirements specified in ISO/IEC 21838-1.
- ISO/IEC 21838-4:2023 Information Technology - Top-level ontologies (TLO) - Part 4: TUpper describes TUpper, as an ontology conformant to the requirements specified in ISO/IEC 21838-1.

== Top-Level Ontology Requirements ==
ISO/IEC 21838-1 prescribes the following requirements for any top-level ontology.

A TLO shall include a textual artifact represented by a natural language document providing:

- A list of domain-neutral terms and relational expressions
- Identification of primitive terms, i.e. terms that cannot be defined without circularity.
- Definitions of all non-primitive terms and relational expressions that are non-circular, form a consistent set, and are concise, i.e. contain no redundant elements.
- The signature of the TLO shall contain no terms or relational expressions that are used exclusively in one or in a restricted group of domains.

In addition the TLO shall be made available via at least one machine-readable axiomatization in either:

- OWL 2 with the direct semantics, or
- a Description Logic (DL) that is designated by the World Wide Web Consortium as a successor of OWL 2

The TLO shall further be made available via a Common Logic (CL) axiomatization conforming to ISO/IEC 24707.

The ontology documentation specified above shall be made publicly available and consist of:

- A natural language document designed to support use and maintenance of the ontology by human users
- An axiomatization of the ontology in OWL 2 with direct semantics designed to support computational reasoning
- Where relevant, a CL axiomatization of the ontology in an ISO/IEC 24707 conformant language

Supplementary documentation shall be made publicly available:

- Specifying how the ontology is used or is intended to be used
- Specifying how the OWL axiomatization is logically derivable from the CL axiomatization
- Demonstrating the breadth of coverage of the ontology
- Documenting policies for ontology management

== Demonstrating Breadth of Coverage ==
To demonstrate a sufficiently broad coverage domain and thus to show that it is a true top-level ontology, each candidate TLO is required to show that it has a very wide range of application, ideally one that covers all entities in the universe. Given that the main purpose of the TLO is to enhance the data in a range of databases in such a way as to promote their integration and discoverability, it suffices to demonstrate that coverage domain of the candidate TLO extends across a very broad and diverse range of types of data which the terms in the ontology may then be used to annotate. The strategy for demonstrating breadth of coverage accordingly rests on the provision in ISO/IEC 21838-1 of a list of types of data, including data about:

- Space and time; space and place; time and change
- Parts, wholes, unity and boundaries
- Scale and granularity
- Qualities and other attributes (such as dispositions and roles)
- Quantities and mathematical entities
- Causality, processes and events
- Constitution
- Information and reference
- Artifacts and socially constructed entities (such as money)
- Mental entities

Each candidate TLO is required to specify how it will deal with data under all, or nearly all, of these headings, or to specify ontologies built using this TLO which already serve this purpose. Basic Formal Ontology, for example (see below), has no native term for information entities such as sentences or data items or publications. These terms are however supplied by the BFO-conformant Information Artifact Ontology (IAO).

== Basic Formal Ontology as a Top-Level Ontology ==
ISO/IEC 21838-2 describes how Basic Formal Ontology (BFO) satisfies the requirements of ISO/IEC 21838-1. BFO is an ontology developed by Barry Smith and his collaborators. A BFO textbook was published in 2015 to promote interoperability among the very large number of domain ontologies built using its terms and relational expressions.

The BFO ontology is documented in the ISO Standards Maintenance Portal here. This includes:

1. A natural language document providing domain-neutral terms and relational expressions accompanied by concise, consistent, and non-circular definitions for all non-primitive terms
2. A signature containing no terms or relational expressions used exclusively in one or in a restricted group of domains.
3. An axiomatization in OWL 2 with the direct semantics.
4. An axiomatization in CL.
5. Specification of the logical derivability of the OWL axiomatization from the CL axiomatization, and breadth of ontology coverage.
6. A specification of the different ways in which developers of ontologies at lower levels can demonstrate conformity to BFO.
7. Reference to the statement of principles of use and management of the ontology provided by the Open Biological and Biomedical Ontologies (OBO) Foundry, principles which are adopted by the BFO developer community.

In addition, the community of BFO developers and users has provided:

1. A publicly available ontology developers' guide,
2. Publicly available repositories for the OWL 2 and CL axiomatizations incorporating commentary on these axiomatizations and identifying candidate areas for revision.
3. A publicly available list of ontologies reusing BFO and of organizations using BFO in their ontology development work, available at https://basic-formal-ontology.org/users.html.

== See also ==
- Basic Formal Ontology
- Formal ontology
- Semantic interoperability
- Barry Smith (ontologist)
