= Lawn, West Virginia =

- Unincorporated community
- Location within West Virginia Location within the United States
- Coordinates: 37°50′23″N 80°45′10″W
- Country: United States
- State: West Virginia
- County: Greenbrier
- Elevation: 2,628 ft (801 m)
- Time zone: UTC-5 (Eastern (EST))
  - Summer (DST): UTC-4 (EDT)
- Area codes: 304 & 681
- GNIS feature ID: 1554923

Lawn is an unincorporated community in Greenbrier County, West Virginia, United States. Lawn is 5.5 miles (8.9 km) east-southeast of Meadow Bridge.

The community was named for a large lawn near the original post office.
