= Chris Lawn (philosopher) =

Irish philosopher

Education
- Education: National University of Ireland (PhD); University of Sussex (MA); University of Wales (BA)

Philosophical work
- Era: 21st-century philosophy
- Region: Western philosophy
- Institutions: University of Limerick
- Main interests: Hermeneutics

Chris Lawn is an Irish philosopher, the author of several books on Gadamer's thought and on hermeneutics. Lawn has a B.A. from the University of Wales, an M.A. from the University of Sussex, and a Ph.D. from the National University of Ireland. He has taught philosophy in Mary Immaculate College, University of Limerick.

== Books ==
- Wittgenstein and Gadamer: Towards a Post-Analytic Philosophy of Language, Continuum Press, 2005
- Gadamer: a Guide for the Perplexed, Continuum. 2006
- The Gadamer Dictionary, with Niall Keane, A&C Black. 2011
- The Blackwell Companion to Hermeneutics, edited with Niall Keane, Wiley-Blackwell. 2015
