= Roman Ingarden =

Polish philosopher (1893–1970)

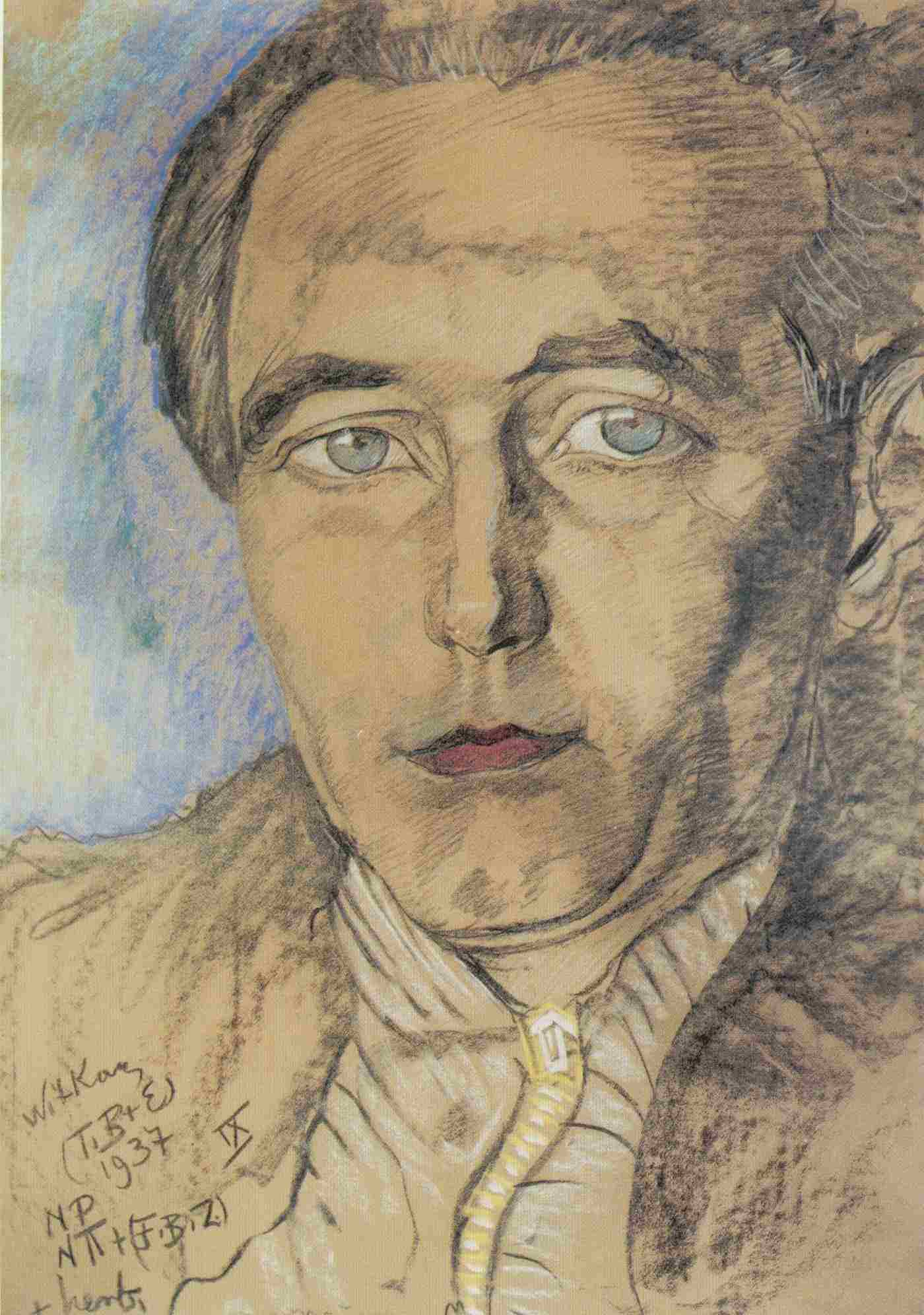
- Portrait of Roman Ingarden by Witkacy
- Born: 5 February 1893; Kraków, Grand Duchy of Cracow, Austria-Hungary
- Died: 4 June 1970 (aged 77); Kraków, People's Republic of Poland
- Children: Roman Stanisław Ingarden

Education
- Education: University of Göttingen; University of Freiburg (PhD, 1918); Lwów University (Dr. phil. hab., 1925)
- Doctoral advisor: Edmund Husserl

Philosophical work
- Era: 20th-century philosophy
- Region: Western philosophy
- School: Phenomenology; Realist phenomenology Neoplatonism
- Main interests: Aesthetics, epistemology, formal ontology, nature vs nurture
- Notable ideas: Ontology of the work of art

Roman Witold Ingarden (Note: /ˈroʊmɑːn ɪnˈɡɑːrdən/; Polish: [ˈrɔman inˈɡardɛn]) (5 February 1893 – 14 June 1970) was a Polish philosopher who worked in aesthetics, ontology, and phenomenology.

Before World War II, Ingarden published his works mainly in the German language and in books and newspapers. During the war, he switched to Polish out of solidarity with his homeland after the German invasion, and as a result, his major works in ontology went largely unnoticed and undetected by the wider world and philosophical community. Nevertheless, Ingarden's writings have made some indirect cultural impact through the writings of his student Karol Wojtyla, the future Pope John Paul II.

== Biography ==
Ingarden was born in Kraków, Austria-Hungary, on February 5, 1893. He first studied mathematics and philosophy at the Lwów University under Kazimierz Twardowski, then moved to the University of Göttingen in Germany to study philosophy under Edmund Husserl. He was considered by Husserl to be one of his best and greatest students and accompanied Husserl to the University of Freiburg, where, in 1918, Ingarden submitted his doctoral dissertation with Husserl as director. The title of his thesis was Intuition und Intellekt bei Henri Bergson (Intuition and Intellect in Henri Bergson). Ingarden previously suggested that he transfer to Lwów and write a new dissertation under Twardowski due to an increasing tension between Germany and Poland but Husserl refused and was uninterested.

Ingarden then returned to Poland, where he spent his academic career after obtaining his doctorate. For a long period, he had to support himself by secondary-school teaching. During this period, one of his works - aside from his post-doctoral work in epistemology - was a review of the Festschrift written for Twardowski. This involved an analysis of Zygmunt Lempicki's "W sprawie uzasadnienia poetyki czystej" (On the Justification of Pure Poetics).

In 1925 he submitted his Habilitationschrift, Essentiale Fragen (Essential Questions), to Kazimierz Twardowski at Lwów University. This thesis was noticed by the English-speaking philosophical community. In 1933, the university promoted him as professor of philosophy. He became well known for his work on The Literary Work of Art (Das literarische Kunstwerk. Eine Untersuchung aus dem Grenzgebiet der Ontologie, Logik und Literaturwissenschaft, 1931). Particularly, interest in his works increased when the English translation of this text was released.

From 1939 to 1941 during the Soviet occupation of Lwów he continued his university activity and lived in the Kraków area. After the Operation Barbarossa 1941 under the German occupation Ingarden secretly taught students mathematics and philosophy. After his house was bombed, he continued work on his book, The Controversy over the Existence of the World.

Ingarden became a professor at Nicolaus Copernicus University in Toruń in 1945 shortly after the war but was banned in 1946 under the Communist regime. He then moved to the Jagiellonian University in Kraków, where he was offered a position. In 1949, however, he was banned from teaching due to his alleged idealism, supposedly being an "enemy of materialism". In 1957 he was reappointed at the Jagiellonian University after the ban was lifted, and so he went on to teach, write and publish.

Ingarden died on June 14, 1970, in Kraków as a result of a cerebral hemorrhage.

== Works ==
Ingarden was a realist phenomenologist and thus did not accept Husserl's transcendental idealism. His training was phenomenological; thus, his work as a whole was directed towards ontology. That is why Ingarden is one of the most renowned phenomenological ontologists, as he strove to describe the ontological structure and state of being of various objects based on the essential features of any experience that could provide such knowledge.

The best-known works of Ingarden, and the only ones widely-known to English-speaking readers, concern aesthetics and literature. His most popular book, for instance, was The Literary Work of Art, which explored the concept of the literary work of art. In this book, Ingarden argued that a literary work of art is a purely intentional object and is a product of the author's conscious acts. This work would contribute to the development of the literary theory called reader-response criticism and influence scholars such as René Wellek and Wolfgang Iser. Another notable notion in Ingarden's aesthetics was his idea that music is not a form of literature. He maintained that literary works have four distinct ontological strata, and one of these - the stratum of represented objectivities - is absent in musical works. In his stratification of literary work of art, he cited that aesthetic value is the polyphonic harmony that arises between these strata of meaning.

The exclusive focus on Ingarden's work in aesthetics does not reflect Ingarden's overall philosophical standpoint, which is focused on the ideas regarding formal, existential, and material ontology set forth in his The Controversy over the Existence of the World. In his aesthetic investigations, Ingarden considered aesthetics as an integral part of philosophy. He argued that his aesthetic theory is not only an analysis of art but an approach that answers basic philosophical issues. Ingarden also attempted to establish a phenomenological circle at Lvov. The group, which focused on aesthetics and descriptive psychology, attracted some of Twardowski's students including Leopold Blaustein and Eugénie Ginsberg. Ingarden was a close associate of Edith Stein. He came to her defense when her work with Husserl was challenged.

Ingarden wrote his autobiography in 1949. This work, which was written in third person, was one of the three biographies he submitted to Władysław Tatarkiewicz, who was then revising his Historia filozofii (History of philosophy). The philosopher had also undertaken work for Husserl.

=== Main works in German ===
- Intuition und Intellekt bei Henri Bergson, Halle: Max Niemeyer, 1921
- Essentiale Fragen. Ein Beitrag zum Problem des Wesens, Halle: Max Niemeyer, 1925
- Das literarische Kunstwerk. Eine Untersuchung aus dem Grenzgebiet der Ontologie, Logik und Literaturwissenschaft, Halle: Max Niemeyer, 1931
- Untersuchungen zur Ontologie der Kunst: Musikwerk. Bild. Architektur. Film, Tübingen: Max Niemeyer, 1962
- Der Streit um die Existenz der Welt, Bd. I, II/I, II/2. Tübingen: Max Niemeyer, 1964
- Vom Erkennen des literarischen Kunstwerks, Tübingen: Max Niemeyer, 1968
- Erlebnis, Kunstwerk und Wert. Vorträge zur Ästhetik 1937-1967, Tübingen: Max Niemeyer, 1969
- Über die Verantwortung. Ihre ontischen Fundamente, Stuttgart: Reclam, 1970
- Über die kausale Struktur der realen Welt. Der Streit um die Existenz der Welt, Band III, Tübingen: Max Niemeyer, 1974

=== Main works in Polish ===
- Niektóre założenia idealizmu Berkeley'a [Some of the Tenets of Berkeley’s Idealism]. Lwów. 1931.
- O poznawaniu dzieła literackiego (The Cognition of the Literary Work of Art), Ossolineum, Lwów: 1937
- O budowie obrazu. Szkic z teorii sztuki (On the Structure of Paintings: A Sketch of the Theory of Art), Rozprawy Wydziału Filozoficznego PAU Vol. LXVII, No.2, Kraków, 1946
- O dziele architektury (On Architectural Works), Nauka i Sztuka, Vol. II, 1946, No. 1, pp. 3-26 and No. 2, pp. 26-51
- Spór o istnienie Świata (Controversy over the Existence of the World), PAU, Vol. I, Kraków: 1947, Vol. II, Kraków, 1948
- Szkice z filozofii literatury (Sketches on the Philosophy of Literature), Vol. 1, Spółdzielnia wydawnicza "Polonista," Łódz, 1947
- Elementy dzieła muzycznego (The Elements of Musical Works), Sprawozdania Towarzystwa Naukowego w Toruniu, Vol. IX, 1955, Nos. 1-4, pp. 82-84
- Studia z estetyki (Studies in Aesthetics), PWN, Vol. I Warszawa, 1957, Vol. II, Warszawa, 1958
- O dziele literackim (On Literary Works). PWN, Warszawa, 1960
- Przeżycie - dzieło - wartość (Experience - Work of Art - Value). Wydawnictwo Literackie, Kraków, 1966
- Studia z estetyki Tom III (Studies in Aesthetics, Vol. III), PWN, Warszawa, 1970
- U podstaw teorii poznania (At the Foundations of the Theory of Knowledge), PWN, Warszawa, 1971
- Książeczka o człowieku (Little Book About Man), Wydawnictwo Literackie, Kraków, 1972.
- Utwór muzyczny i sprawa jego tożsamości (The Work of Music and the Problem of Its Identity), Polskie Wydawnictwo Muzyczne, Warszawa, 1973.

=== Main works translated into English ===
- Controversy over the Existence of the World. Volumes I and II, translated by Arthur Szylewicz, Bern: Peter Lang, 2013 / 2016.
- Time and Modes of Being, (selection from Der Streit), translated by Helen R. Michejda. Springfield, Illinois: Charles C. Thomas, 1964.
- The Cognition of the Literary Work of Art, Translated by Ruth Ann Crowley and Kenneth R. Olson. Evanston, Illinois: Northwestern University Press, 1973.
- The Literary Work of Art, Translated by George G. Grabowicz. Evanston, Illinois: Northwestern University Press, 1973.
- Letter to Husserl about the VI [Logical] Investigation and ‘Idealism’ In Tymieniecka, 1976.
- Man and Value, Translated by Arthur Szylewicz. München: Philosophia Verlag, 1983.
- On the Motives which led Edmund Husserl to Transcendental Idealism, Translated by Arnor Hannibalsson. The Hague: 1976.
- The Ontology of the Work of Art, Translated by Raymond Meyer with John T. Goldthwait. Athens, Ohio: Ohio University Press, 1989.
- Selected Papers in Aesthetics, Ed. by Peter J. McCormick, München: Philosophia Verlag,1985.
- The Work of Music and the Problem of Its Identity, Translated by Adam Czerniawski. London: Macmillan, 1986.

== See also ==
- History of philosophy in Poland
- List of Poles
