= German philosophy =

Specialty in philosophy, focused on German language origin

German philosophy is philosophy in Germany, by German people, and in the German language, a part of German culture.

German philosophers are central to major philosophical movements such as rationalist Gottfried Wilhelm Leibniz, German idealists and romanticists such as Immanuel Kant and Georg Wilhelm Friedrich Hegel, dialectical materialist Karl Marx, and existentialist Friedrich Nietzsche.

German philosophy influenced both contemporary philosophical schools: analytic philosophy such as Gottlob Frege, Ludwig Wittgenstein, and the logical positivist Vienna Circle; and continental phenomenology and hermeneutics such as Edmund Husserl, Martin Heidegger, and Frankfurt School critical theory. Heidegger and Wittgenstein are two of the most influential philosophers of the 20th century. Naturally, most German universities study continental philosophy.

== Middle ages ==
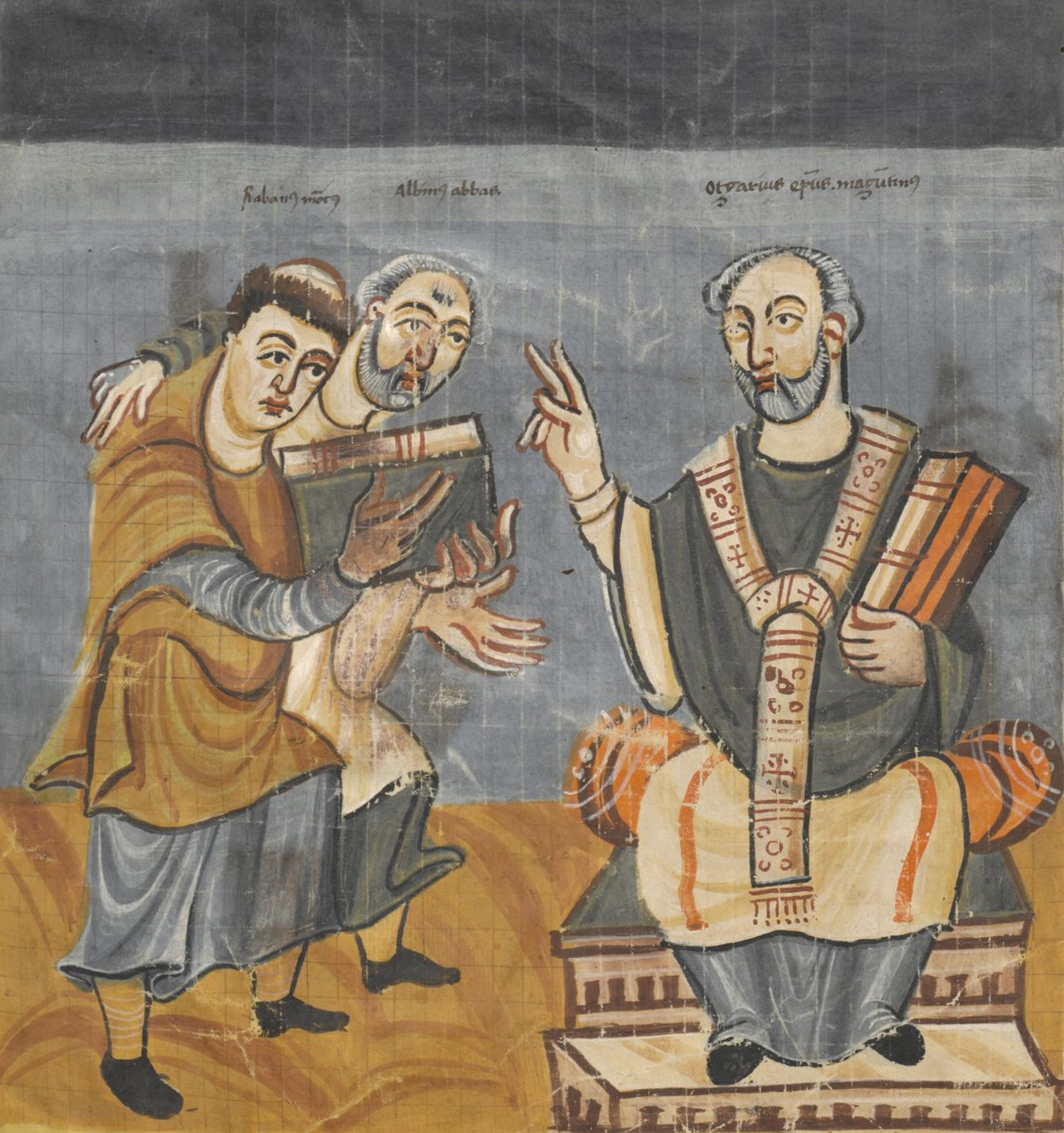
Carolingian manuscript, c. 831. Rabanus Maurus (left), with Alcuin (middle), dedicating his work to Archbishop Otgar of Mainz (right)

Medieval philosophy was often Christian philosophy and tied to theology. The first German philosophical controversy happened during the Carolingian Renaissance in the year 848, (Note: While Saint Ambrose (c. 339–397) was born in modern-day Germany, German philosophy starts much later.) when the deacon at the Benedictine Abbey of Fulda in Hesse, Rabanus Maurus (c. 780–856), known as "the first teacher of Germany", and a student of Charlemagne's preferred scholar Alcuin of York, responded to Gottschalk of Orbais' doctrine of double predestination.

=== Aristotelianism and Neoplatonism ===
Latin literacy had declined so much that Notker Labeo (c. 950–1022) translated the Roman Neoplatonist Boethius, Capella, and some Aristotle, inventing the first German philosophical vocabulary. (Note: At St. Emmeram's in Regensburg, Otloh of Sankt Emmeram (c. 1010–c. 1072) and Manegold of Lautenbach (c. 1030–c. 1103) were opponents of philosophy. By the twelfth century, all the monks at St. Emmeram's were illiterate. Otloh preferred the study of music.)

The few twelfth-century Renaissance German philosophers during the High Middle Ages begin with Hugh of Saint Victor (c. 1096–1141), who studied at the abbey of Saint Victor in Paris, and was a Neoplatonic mystic influenced by Plato's Timaeus and Pseudo-Dionysius the Areopagite, the "progenitor of ... negative theology."

Otto of Freising (c. 1111–1158) was likely Hugh's student and introduced to Germans the new, complete logic of Aristotle. Hugh also influenced Italian Peter Lombard (c. 1096–1160), author of the Sentences (c. 1150).

Neoplatonist nun and polymath Hildegard von Bingen (c. 1098–1179) called the "Sibyl of the Rhine" knew Latin and wrote on theology, cosmology, and natural philosophy (science). (Note: She has also become recognized as one of the Middle Ages best musicians and composers, ever since Gothic Voices recorded A Feather on the Breath of God (1982).) In works like Scivias (1151), she wrote God infused life with greenness.

==== Albert the Great ====
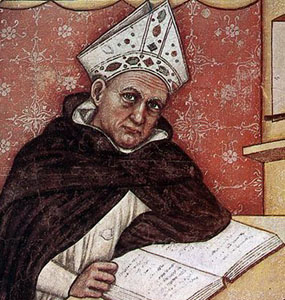
Saint Albert the Great, in a fresco by Tomaso da Modena (1352).

Aristotle's other works became available from translators in Spain, one of whom was Herman the German. The most eminent German Scholastic, Dominican friar Saint Albert the Great (c. 1200–1280), taught the Physics and Nicomachean Ethics at Paris and Cologne. He influenced students such as Neoplatonist Theodoric of Freiberg (c. 1250–c. 1311), Italian Aristotelian Saint Thomas Aquinas (c. 1225–1274), and Aristotle translator William of Moerbeke (c. 1225–c. 1286).

German Dominicans were usually Albertists, Aristotelians with a blend of Neoplatonism like Theodoric, such as Ulrich (c. 1225–1277) and Hugh Ripelin of Strassburg (c. 1205–c. 1270).

Albertists were contrasted with the purely Aristotelian Thomists following Aquinas, such as John of Lichtenberg (c. 1275–c. 1315), Heinrich of Lübeck, Heinrich of Gorkum (c. 1378–1431), Nicholas and Thomas of Strassburg (c. 1275–c. 1357), and John (c. 1280–c. 1340) and Gerhard of Sterngassen. The Paulinerkirche at Göttingen housed relics of Aquinas.

British Franciscan Duns Scotus (c. 1265–1308) died shortly after coming to teach in Cologne, buried at the Church of the Friars Minor; and had limited influence in Germany, despite exceptions such as Scotist Heinrich von Werl (c. 1400–c. 1463). Henry the German (c. 1245–1340) was an Augustinian hermit.

==== Meister Eckhart ====
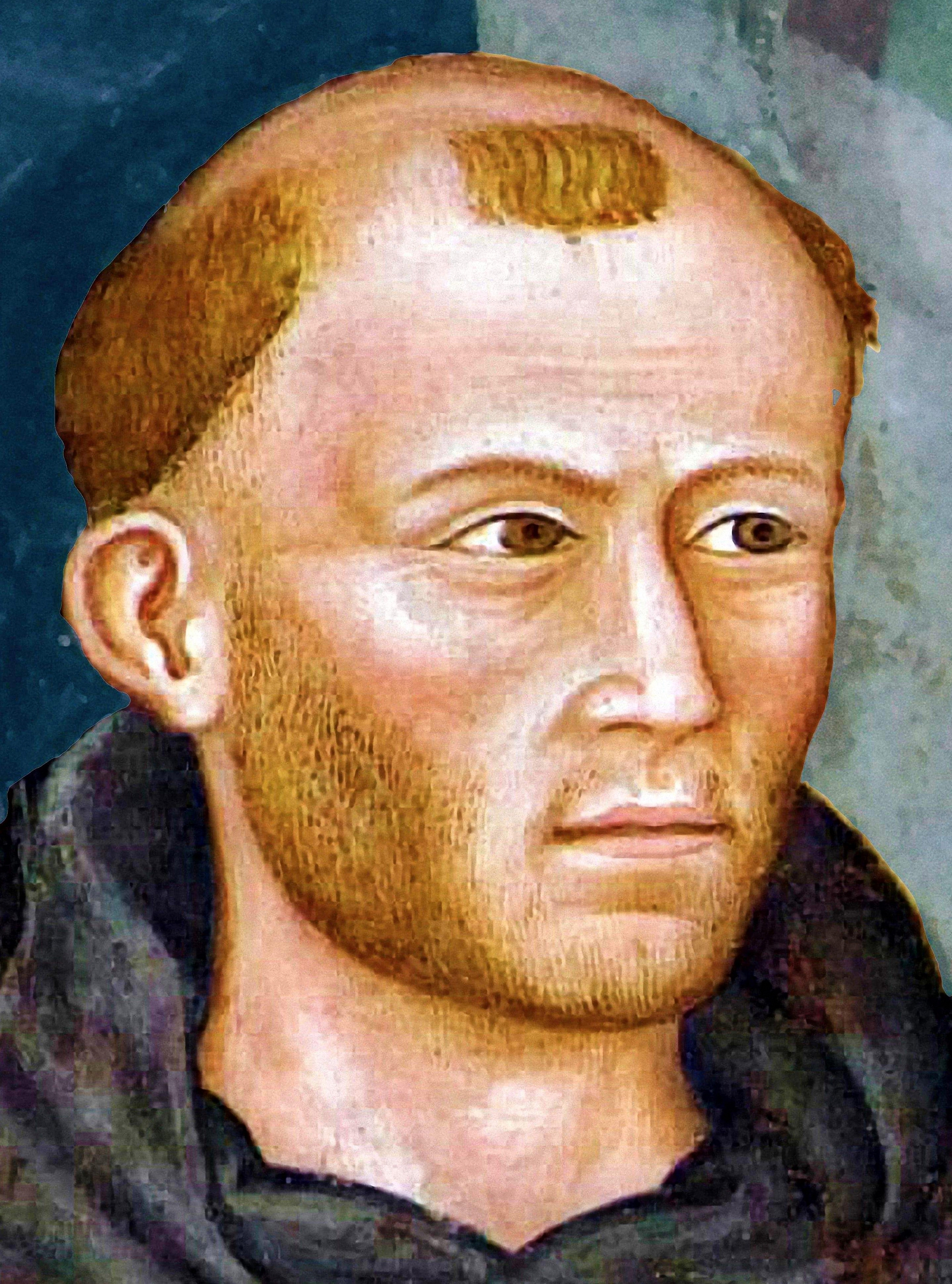
Meister Eckhart in a posthumous portrait by Andrea di Bonaiuto (c. 1366)

Meister Eckhart (c. 1260–c. 1328), an influential Neoplatonic mystic at Cologne, wrote the Book of Divine Consolation. Eckhart combined Theodoric's mysticism with the non-philosophical mysticism found among beguine orders, like Mechthild of Magdeburg (c. 1207–c. 1282), author of The Flowing Light of the Godhead.

Meister Eckhart was posthumously condemned for heresy, and defended by Henry Suso (1295–1366). Eckhart influenced the Friends of God and Brabantine priest John of Ruusbroec (1294–1381), who influenced the Brethren of the Common Life and Devotio Moderna proponent Thomas à Kempis (c. 1380–1471), author of The Imitation of Christ.

Albertist Berthold of Moosburg succeeded Eckhart at Cologne, influencing Johannes Tauler (c. 1300–1361) and Heymeric de Campo (1395–1460). A contemporary Thomist at Cologne was Lambertus de Monte (c. 1430–1499).

==== Modistae ====
Thomas of Erfurt was the most influential of the Aristotelian so called modistae or speculative grammarians arguing for realism on the problem of universals across 13th and 14th-century Northern Europe. (Note: His major work, Tractatus de modis significandi seu Grammatica speculativa, was often misattributed to Scotus, until 1922.)

== German Renaissance ==
=== Nominalism ===
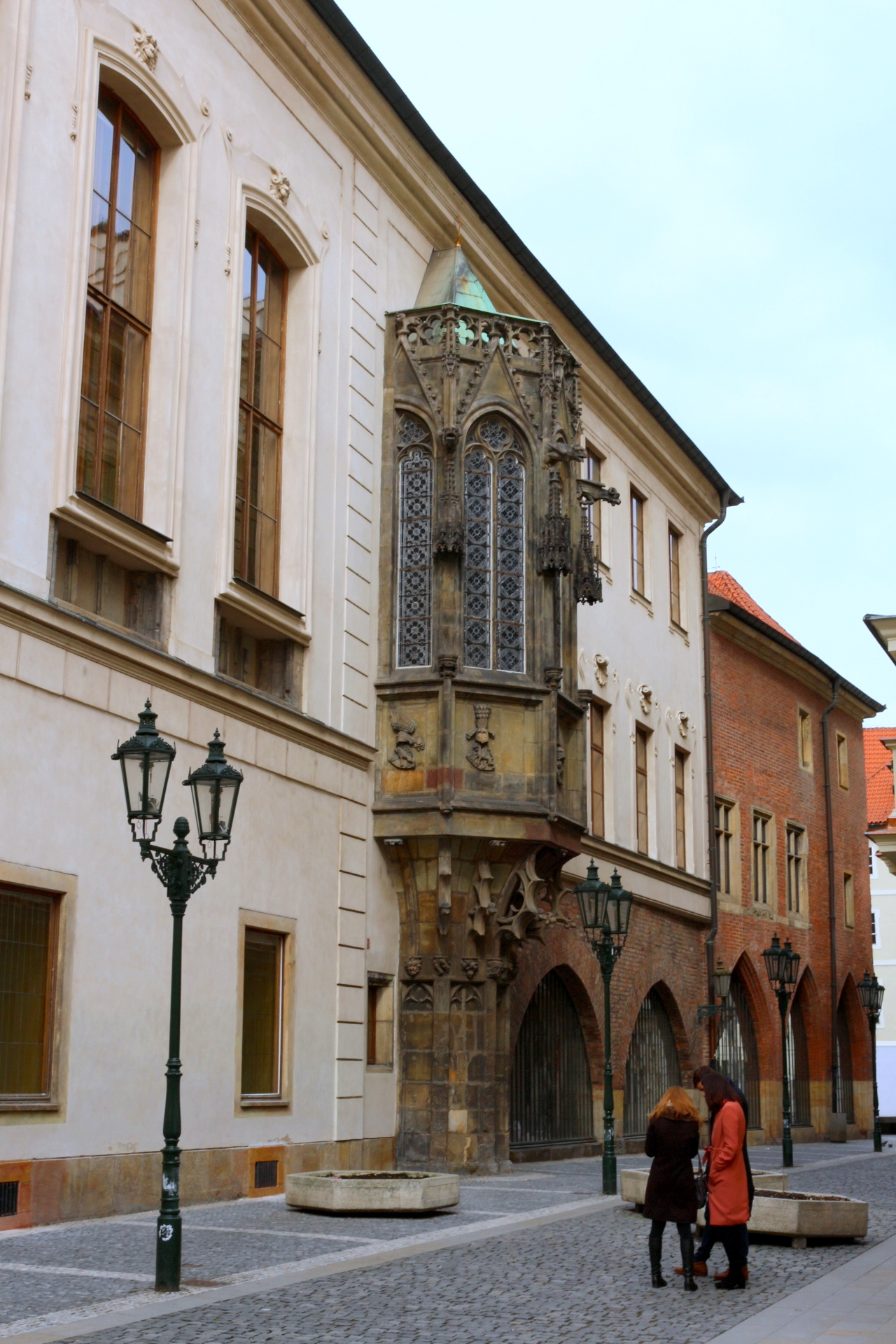
Karolinum – the oldest building at the University of Prague.

British Franciscan William of Ockham (c. 1287–1347) spent his final years taking refuge with Louis IV, Holy Roman Emperor at the Alter Hof in Munich. Ockham's nominalism proved influential in Germany, especially after the Schism of 1378 caused scholars to leave France. The first university in the Holy Roman Empire was the University of Prague (1347), modeled after the University of Paris, then influenced by Ockhamist Jean Buridan.

==== Albert of Saxony ====
Buridan's student Albert of Saxony (c. 1320–1390) became first rector at the second, the University of Vienna (1365). He was a logician and natural philosopher who contributed a theory of impetus, a precursor to inertia in physics.

Henry of Langenstein (c. 1325–1397), who with Henry of Oyta (c. 1330–1397) followed Albert of Saxony at the University of Vienna, taught Ockham's conciliar theory. Albert of Saxony's student Marsilius of Inghen (c. 1340–1396) became first rector at the third German university, the University of Heidelberg (1386). The Dominican Cologne was converted to a studium generale (c. 1388) and was the fourth.

==== Gabriel Biel ====
Another notable German Ockhamist was University of Tübingen professor Gabriel Biel (c. 1420–1495), both an "articulate spokesman of the via moderna and … a discerning user of the ... via antiqua".

=== Humanism ===
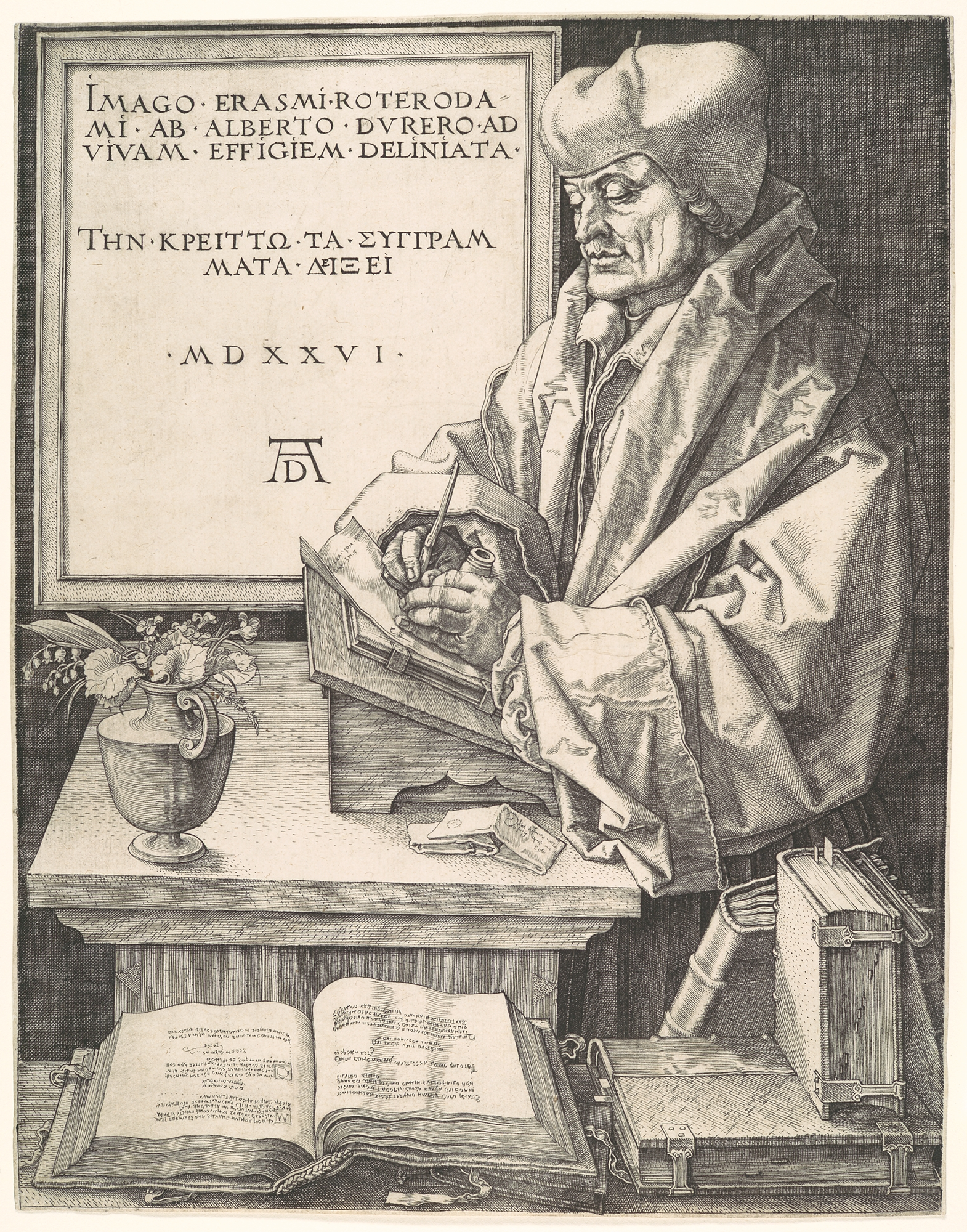
Albrecht Dürer's Portrait of Erasmus (1526)

Nicholas of Cusa (1401–1464) and Dutchman Desiderius Erasmus (c. 1466–1536) were major figures of Northern Renaissance and German Renaissance humanism, along with Conrad Celtis (1459–1508), realist Johann Heynlin (c. 1425–1496), and Johann Reuchlin (1455–1522), who advocated teaching Greek and Hebrew, writing on the Jewish mysticism of Kabbalah in De Arte Cabalistica (1517).

Contemporaneously, Johannes Gutenberg (1406–1468) invented the printing press and created the Gutenberg Bible (c. 1455), marking the start of the Gutenberg Revolution and age of the printed book in the Western world.

==== Nicholas of Cusa ====
A student of Heymeric de Campo, Nicholas of Cusa was a mystic affirming the coincidentia oppositorum and denying the law of non-contradiction. His work Of Learned Ignorance (1440) maintains the finite, human mind cannot fully know the infinite, divine mind, but can nonetheless attain "learned ignorance".

==== Erasmus ====
Desiderius Erasmus was a skeptic and scholar of medieval Christianity best known for works like The Praise of Folly (1511) and Handbook of a Christian Knight (1501). Erasmus was charged by contemporaries with “laying the egg that Luther hatched.”

=== Luther and the Reformation ===
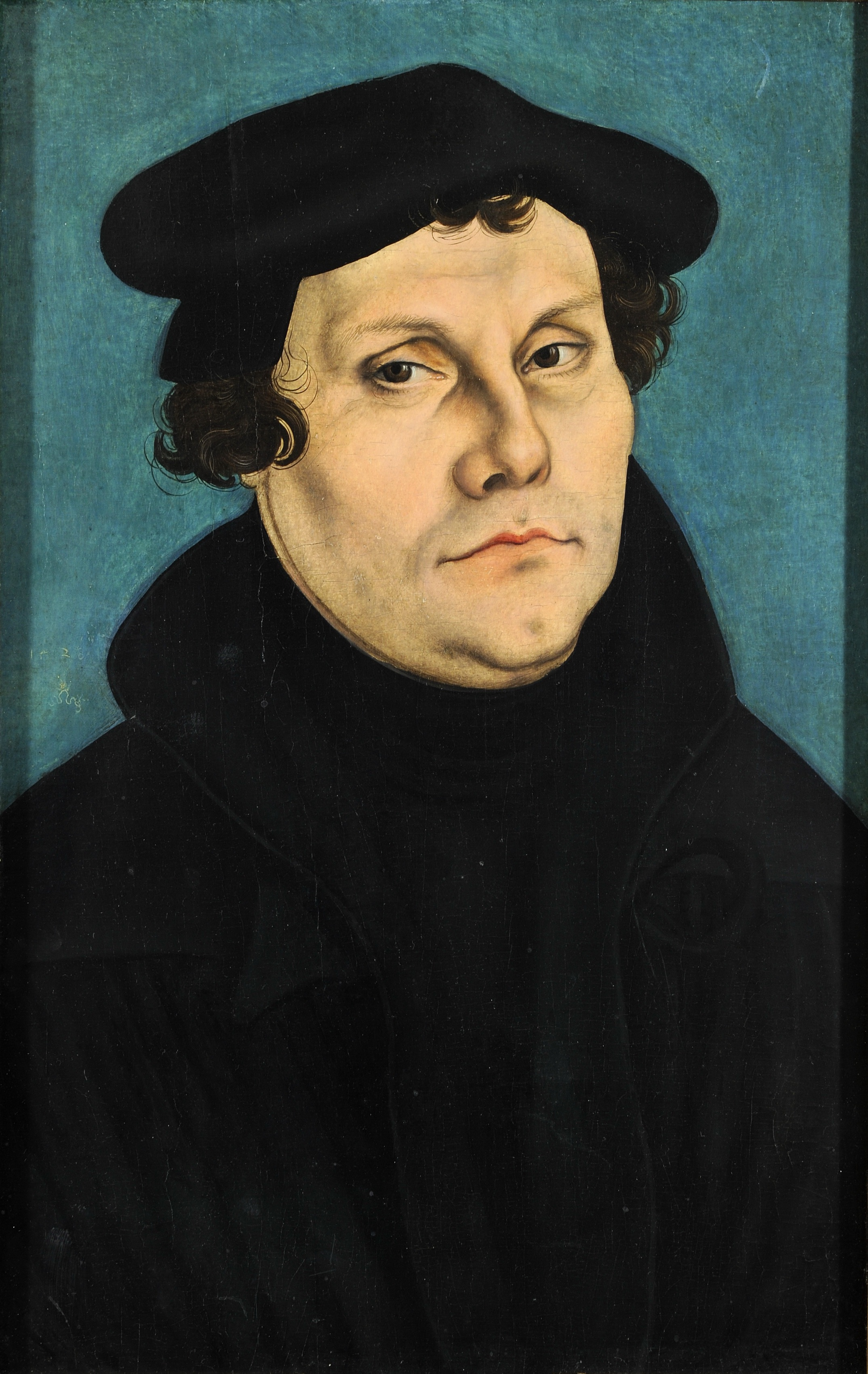
Portrait of Martin Luther

University of Wittenberg professor Martin Luther (1483–1546) started the Reformation and is one of the most influential figures in Western and Christian history.

Luther's German translation of the Bible made it vastly more accessible to the laity, having a wide impact on both the Church and German culture. Luther sparked an international debate on indulgences and other Church practices in works like Ninety-five Theses (1517). According to Philip Melanchthon (1497–1560), they were posted on the door of All Saint's Church.

Protestantism and Lutheranism held salvation was achieved by faith alone (sola fide) and through God alone (monergism). While Luther praised reason as "the best and something divine," he saw it as inadequate in achieving knowledge of God, calling reason "the Devil's harlot".

Erasmus argued against Luther in On Free Will (1524), defending free will and synergism. Led by Erasmus's former assistant Œcolampadius (1482–1531), Basel adopted the Reformation in 1529, deposing elected Catholic councilmen. Erasmus fled to Catholic university town Freiburg, receiving the protection of his former student, Archduke Ferdinand of Austria. Erasmus influenced German Anabaptists such as Balthasar Hubmaier (1480–1528).

=== Ramism ===
The doctrines of French logician, education reformer, and Protestant convert Petrus Ramus (1515–1572) known as Ramism influenced Germans such as Freigius (1543–1583), Caspar Olevian (1536–1587) and Johannes Piscator (1536–1625). Ramist and Melanchthon follower Rudolph Goclenius (1547–1628) taught humanist Otto Casmann (1562–1607), a Protestant convert who attempted Mosaic physics.

=== Hermeticism ===
==== Trithemius ====
Humanist and mystic hermeticist Johannes Trithemius (1462–1516) taught Heinrich Cornelius Agrippa von Nettesheim (1486–1535) and Paracelsus (1493–1541).

==== Agrippa von Nettesheim ====
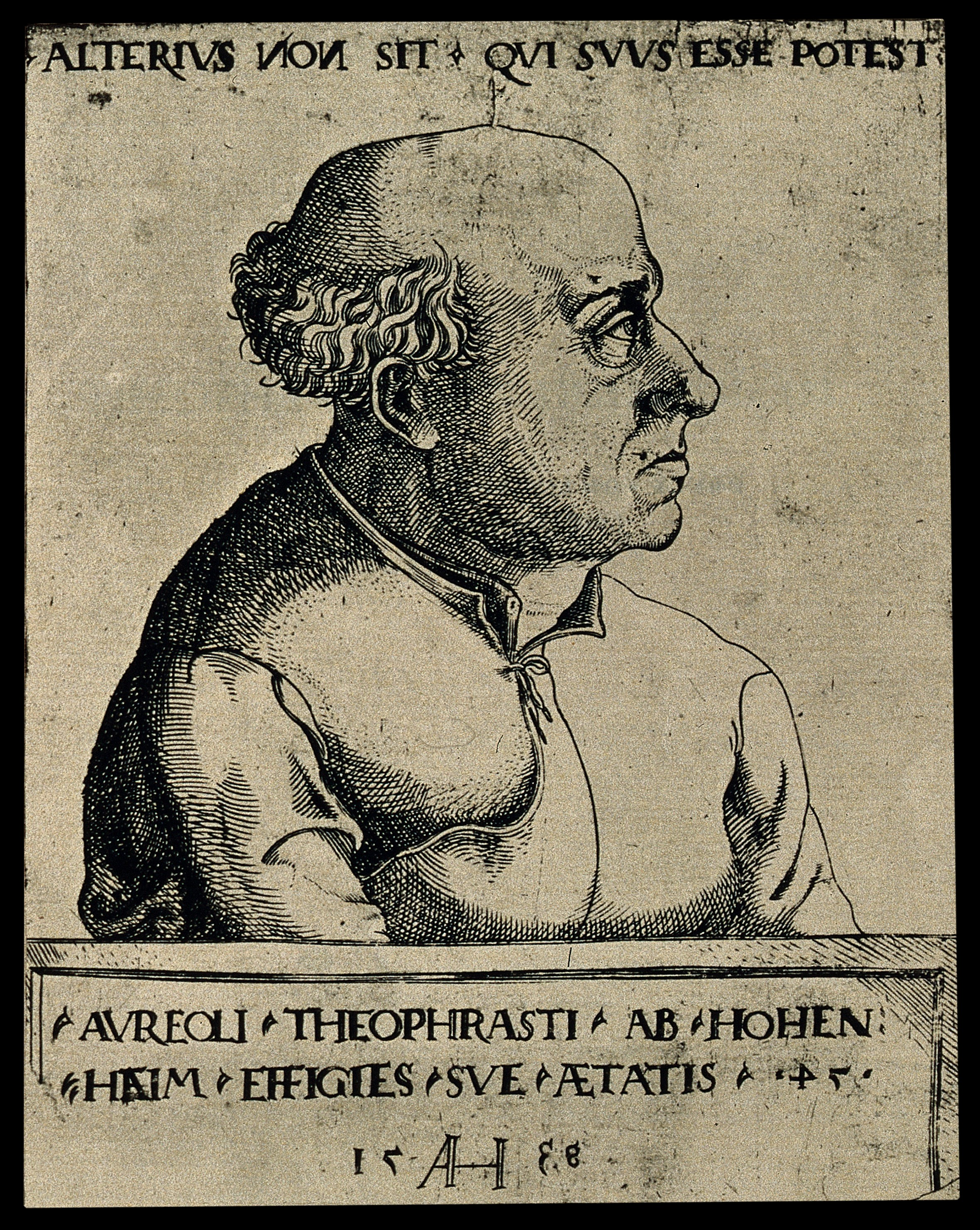
Portrait of Paracelsus by Augustin Hirschvogel

The Albertists and Erasmus also influenced Nettesheim. His Three Books of Occult Philosophy (1533) was widely influential among esotericists, and condemned as heretical by Thomist Conrad Koellin (1476–1536), inquisitor of Cologne. His skepticism also proved influential, found in On the Uncertainty and Vanity of the Arts and Sciences: An Invective Declamation (1530).

==== Paracelsus ====
Paracelsus was an alchemist, Medical Renaissance pioneer called the "father of toxicology". In addition to Aristotle's four classical elements (earth, water, air, and fire), Paracelsus added three principles (sulphur, mercury, and salt), which he thought contained the poisons contributing to all diseases. Gerhard Dorn (c. 1530–1584), Oswald Croll (c. 1563–1609), Andreas Libavius (c. 1550–1616), Heinrich Khunrath (c. 1560–1605), and Valentin Weigel (1533–1588) helped popularize his work.

==== Valentin Weigel ====
Valentin Weigel also followed religious radicals Thomas Müntzer (c. 1489–1525), Andreas Bodenstein von Karlstadt (1486–1541), Sebastian Franck (1499–c. 1543), and Caspar Schwenckfeldt (1490–1561), who believed Christ could be known internally, without reading. Pietist predecessor Johann Arndt (1555–1621) and Pietist Gottfried Arnold (1666–1714) helped spread Valentin Weigel's ideas.

== 17th century ==
=== Kepler ===
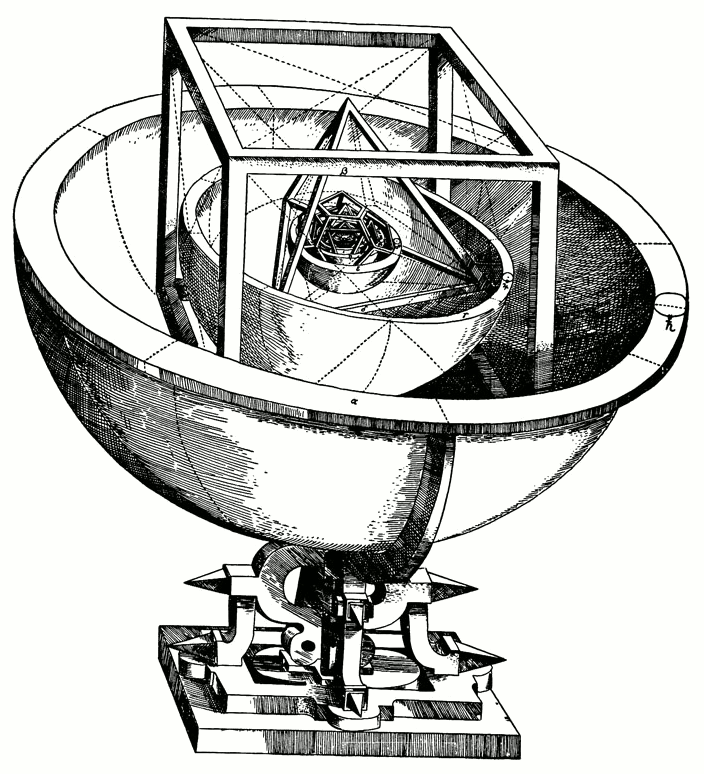
Kepler's Platonic solid model of the Solar System, from Mysterium Cosmographicum (1596)

Melanchthon taught the Wittenberg interpretation of Copernicus, influencing mathematicians Philipp Apian (1531–1589) and Michael Maestlin (1550–1631), who taught natural philosopher Johannes Kepler (1571–1630), a seminal figure in the Scientific Revolution and heliocentrist Copernican Revolution, known for his laws of planetary motion, found in such books as Astronomia nova (1609), Harmonice Mundi (1619), and Epitome Astronomiae Copernicanae.

In Mysterium Cosmographicum (1596) Kepler proposed the distances between the planets track the five Platonic solids. Kepler also wrote the Rudolphine Tables (1627), based on the data and measurements of Dane Tycho Brahe (1546–1601).

=== Böhme ===
Influenced by Valentin Weigel, Lutheran mystic Jakob Böhme (1575–1624) founded theosophy and Behmenism, writing The Way to Christ (1624). A key concept for Böhme is the Ungrund, the un-grounded, primeval abyss prior to the creation of the world, which is also a will and pure freedom. Hegel called Böhme "the first German philosopher." (Note: Note this is considered highly idiosyncratic. "His attempt to show that they were unconsciously moving towards Hegelianism leads to a falsification of the processes of history. Philosophies which will not fit into that pattern are dismissed as "perversities" or, as in the case of Berkeley and Hume are very lightly touched upon; "philosophers" like Jakob Boehme, who suit Hegel's scheme, are discussed at disproportionate length.")

=== Cartesianism ===
Piscator's grandson Tobias Andreae (1604–1676), Johannes Clauberg (1622–1665), Johann Eberhard Schweling (1645–1714), and Ehrenfried Walther von Tschirnhaus (1651–1708) defended Cartesianism, the views of French "father of modern philosophy" René Descartes (1596–1650). Princess Elizabeth of Bohemia (1618–1680) posed the interaction problem for substance dualism to Descartes.

=== Leibniz ===
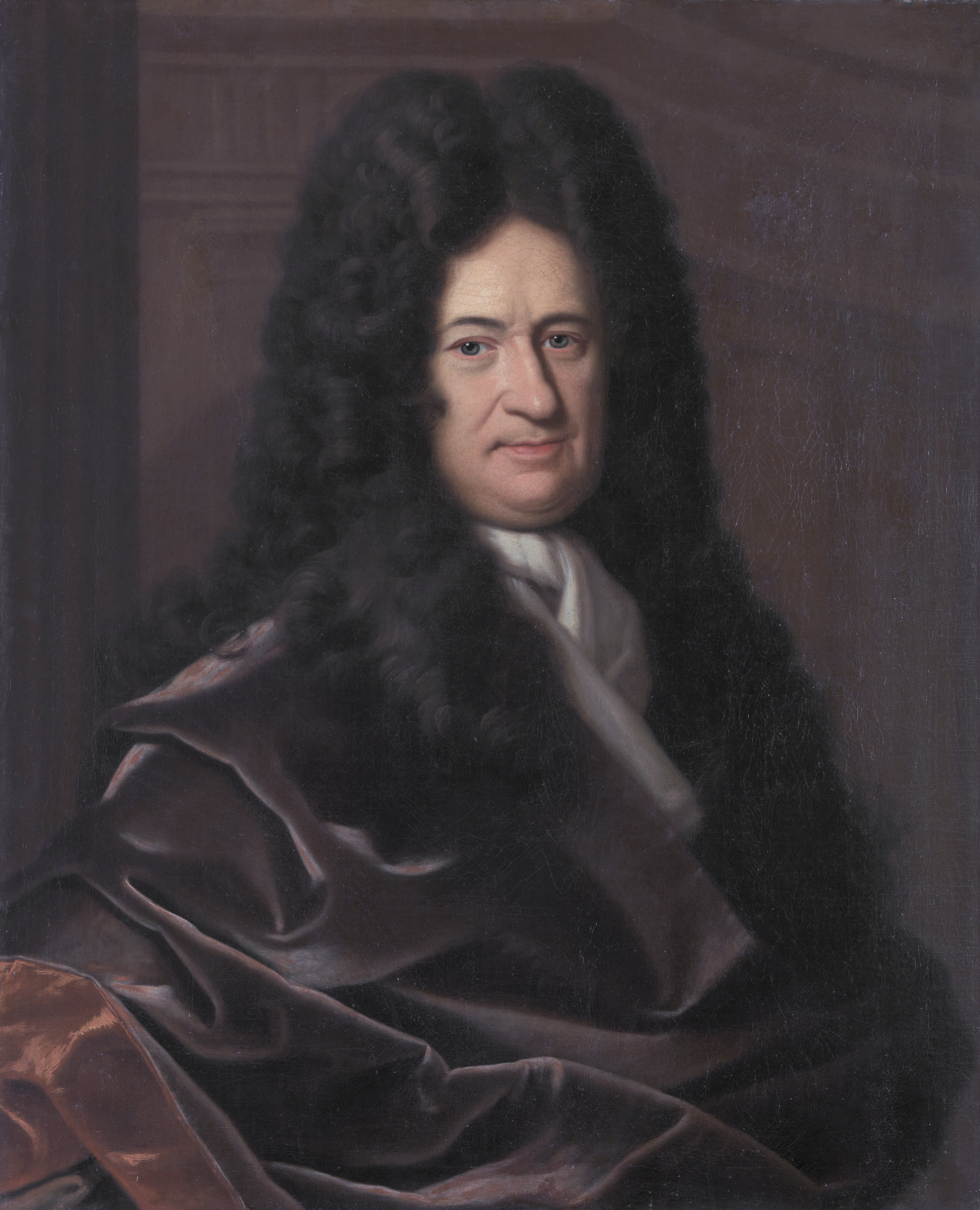
Gottfried Wilhelm Leibniz was a rationalist.

Lutheran philosopher and mathematician Gottfried Wilhelm Leibniz (1646–1716) wrote primarily in Latin and French, such as the Discourse on Metaphysics (1686) and Nouveaux Essais (1689). Leibniz, along with Descartes and Baruch Spinoza (1632–1677), was one of the three great advocates of rationalism, the epistemological view that "regards reason as the chief source and test of knowledge," rather than empirical evidence. Leibniz believed necessary truths were based on the law of non-contradiction, and contingent truths on the principle of sufficient reason, advancing the cosmological argument for God's existence. He anticipated modern analytic philosophy by wishing for a universal language and logical calculus, but his philosophy also looks back to scholasticism.

Leibniz expounded an idealist theory of monads in works like Monadologie (1714). Monads are the ultimate elements composing the universe, comparable to the corpuscles of Cartesian mechanical philosophy; except Cartesian objects are merely extended in space, while Leibniz agreed with the scholastics that objects have substantial forms and entelechy. Monads are centers of force; while space, matter, and motion are merely phenomenal or relational. Monads additionally have the following properties: they are simple (having no parts) substances, eternal, individual, subject to their own laws, un-interacting ("windowless"), and only seem to interact causally due to God's pre-established harmony (a historically important example of panpsychism).

Leibniz was an optimist – his Théodicée (1710) tries to resolve the problem of evil by claiming this is the best of all possible worlds, because it was created by an all powerful and all knowing God, who would not choose to create an imperfect world if a better world was possible. Leibniz also contributed to library science, at the Herzog August Library in Wolfenbüttel.

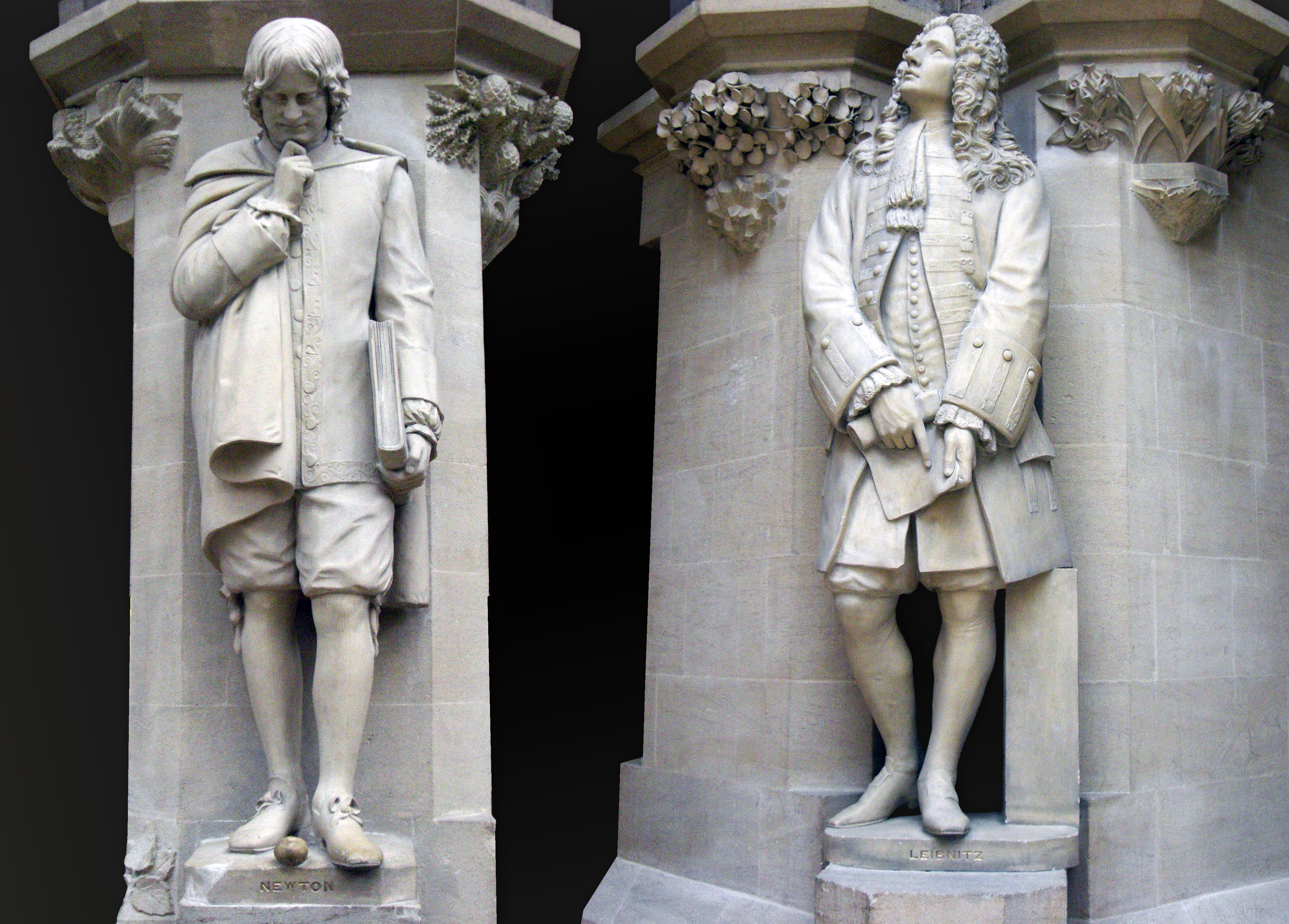
Statues of Isaac Newton and Gottfried Wilhelm Leibniz in the courtyard of the Oxford University Museum of Natural History, collage

The Enlightenment was heavily influenced by British natural philosopher Isaac Newton (1643–1727) and Newtonianism. Influenced by Kepler, Newton published Philosophiæ Naturalis Principia Mathematica (1686) and his laws of motion, introducing classical mechanics to physics. Leibniz and Newton disputed who had invented calculus, and the nature of space.

=== Occasionalism ===
Occasionalists like French Cartesian Nicolas Malebranche (1638–1715) posit only God causes events. The German occasionalists were Leibniz teacher Erhard Weigel (1625–1699), and Descartes and Leibniz critic Johann Sturm (1635–1703).

Erhard Weigel taught Samuel von Pufendorf (1632–1694). Pufendorf supported religious tolerance following the Thirty Years War (1618–1648), and authored On the Duty of Man and Citizen (1673).

== 18th century ==
=== Enlightenment ===
The start of the German Enlightenment (Aufklärung) is commonly traced to Pufendorf's follower Christian Thomasius (1655–1728) lecturing in German. The nearby Swiss Enlightenment included physiognomist Johann Kaspar Lavater (1741–1801), his friend Johann Konrad Pfenninger (1747–1792), and Berlin Academy of Sciences member Johann Georg Sulzer (1720–1779).

=== Wolff ===
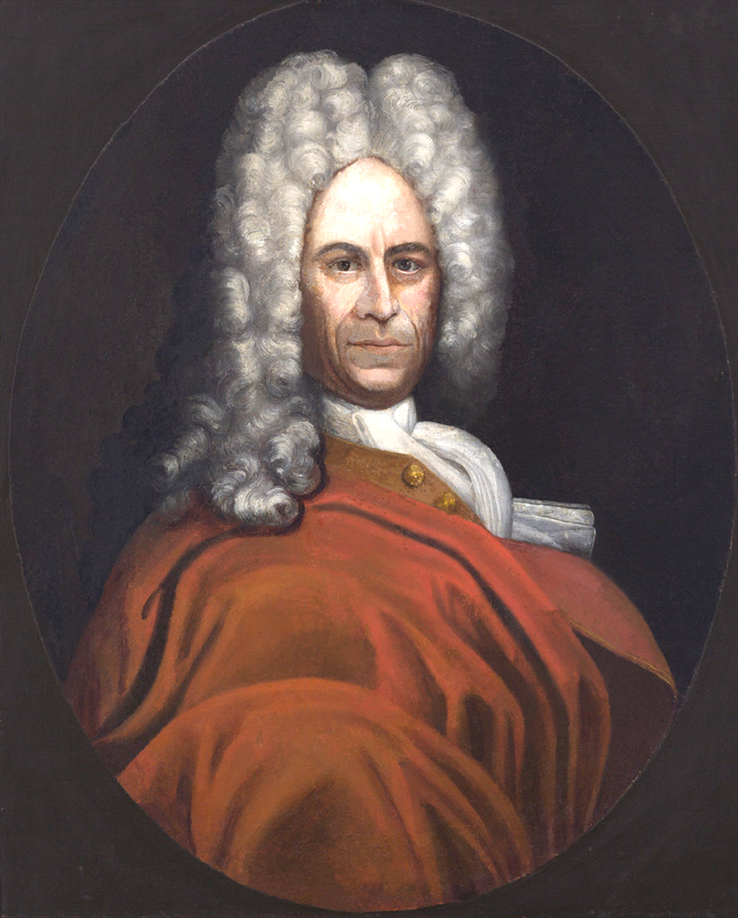
Christian Wolff followed Leibniz's philosophy.

The most eminent German philosopher between Leibniz and Kant was Christian Wolff (1679–1754), often grouped together with Leibniz as “Leibnizian-Wolffian philosophy”. Wolff's rationalism was criticized by Pietists at the University of Halle like Philipp Spener (1635–1705) and August Hermann Francke (1663–1727).

Wolff studied almost every scholarly subject of his time, displayed according to his logical method; his oeuvre arguably represents the peak of German Enlightenment rationality. Wolff pioneered German language scholarship, replacing Latin terminology with German, but he also wrote in Latin for an international audience. Wolff studied what he called both theoretical and practical philosophy, including economics and public administration.

Wolff and Tübingen logician Gottfried Ploucquet (1716–1790), were originally occasionalists, but eventually abandoned the view. Georg Bernhard Bilfinger (1693–1750) and Israel Gottlieb Canz (1690–1753) also followed Wolff at Tübingen. Ploucquet taught August Friedrich Bök (1739–1815).

Wolff influenced Sulzer and German Enlightenment scientist Tobias Mayer (1723–1762). Alsatian polymath Johann Heinrich Lambert (1728–1777) further developed Leibniz's universal language, Ploucquet's logic, and Mayer's science in Neues Organon (1764). After Mayer's death, Abraham Gotthelf Kästner (1719–1800) directed the Observatory at the University of Göttingen, teaching philosopher and physicist Georg Christoph Lichtenberg (1742–1799). Wolff disciple Adam Weishaupt (1748–1830) founded the Illuminati.

Art theorists Alexander Gottlieb Baumgarten (1714–1762) and Georg Friedrich Meier (1718–1777) were students of Wolff. Baumgarten coined the term aesthetics, and Meier taught Aufklärer Thomas Abbt (1738–1766).

=== Mendelssohn ===
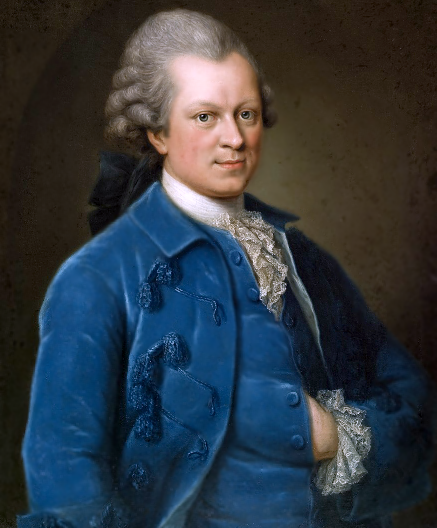
Gotthold Ephraim Lessing advocated the Enlightenment.

Moses Mendelssohn (1729–1786) of the Jewish Enlightenment (Haskalah) wrote Phaedon (1767), a defense of immortality, after Abbt's death. One scholar describes Mendelssohn as “the last great representative of the Leibniz-Wolffian school”. (Note: His descendants include the composers Fanny and Felix Mendelssohn; Felix's son, chemist Paul Mendelssohn Bartholdy; Fanny's grandsons, Paul and Kurt Hensel; and the founders of the Mendelssohn & Co. banking house.) Mendelssohn influenced Salomon Maimon (1753–1800).

=== Lessing ===
Abbt admired Gotthold Ephraim Lessing (1729–1781), who embraced the Enlightenment and religious tolerance, for instance in his play Nathan the Wise (1779), a tribute to Mendelssohn. Lessing said an "ugly, broad ditch" existed between the "accidental truths of history" and "the necessary truths of reason".

Lessing published rationalist deist Hermann Samuel Reimarus (1694–1768) anonymously as the Wolfenbüttel Fragmente. Lessing and Mendelssohn's friend Christoph Friedrich Nicolai (1733–1811) influenced Leibnizian-Wolffian popular philosopher Johann August Eberhard (1739–1809). As well as Lambert and Eberhard, Johannes Nikolaus Tetens (1736–1807), known as the "German Locke", emphasized the phenomenal. Tetens was influenced by Scottish common sense realism.

=== Kant ===
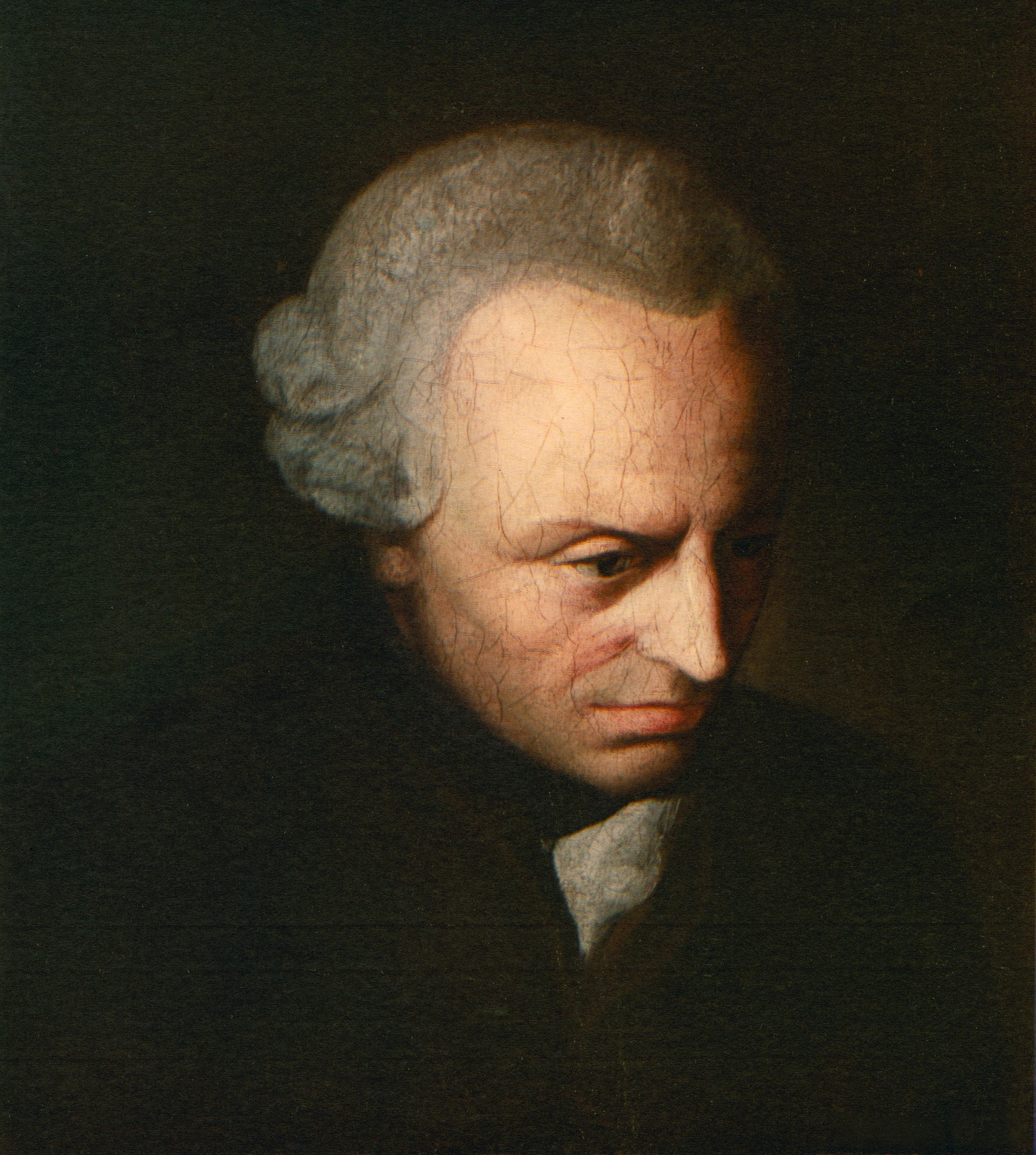
Immanuel Kant proposed transcendental idealism.

Königsberg University professor Immanuel Kant (1724–1804) studied under Wolffian Martin Knutzen (1713–1751). Kant published his elaborate transcendental idealism in the Critique of Pure Reason (1781). Ever since, Kant has been considered one of the greatest influences in all of western philosophy. Kant saw himself as engaged in a "Copernican Revolution", shifting one's outlook into the mind rather than out to the world. He was regarded as the "destroyer" of (scholastic) metaphysics, since called the "all-destroying Kant" by Mendelssohn.

Kant distinguished between analytic truths stipulated by definition, and synthetic truths which were otherwise; as well as between knowledge obtained prior to experience or a priori, and after experience, or a posteriori.

Kant attempted to determine what can be genuinely known through the use of reason independent of all experience, which Kant called the synthetic a priori. Briefly, he concluded knowledge is had through experience, but what can be known is limited by how the mind can think: if we can only comprehend things in terms of, for example, cause and effect, then we can only know causes and effects. It follows one can know the form of all possible experience in the apparent, phenomenal world; but one can never know the noumenal world as it really is, the "thing-in-itself" absent a standpoint, and therefore one can never know the world in its entirety.

Kant was a Pietist seeking the limits of knowledge “in order to make room for faith”. Kant also published the Prolegomena (1783), Groundwork of the Metaphysics of Morals (1785), Critique of Practical Reason (1788), Critique of Judgment (1790), and The Metaphysics of Morals (1797). The Critique of Practical Reason is the best known work containing Kant's deontological ethics, with the categorical imperative; and a moral argument for God, free will, and the immortality of the soul. The Critique of Judgment contains Kant's aesthetics, including his views on the beautiful and the sublime. Kant considered disinterest a key part of the judgement of taste.

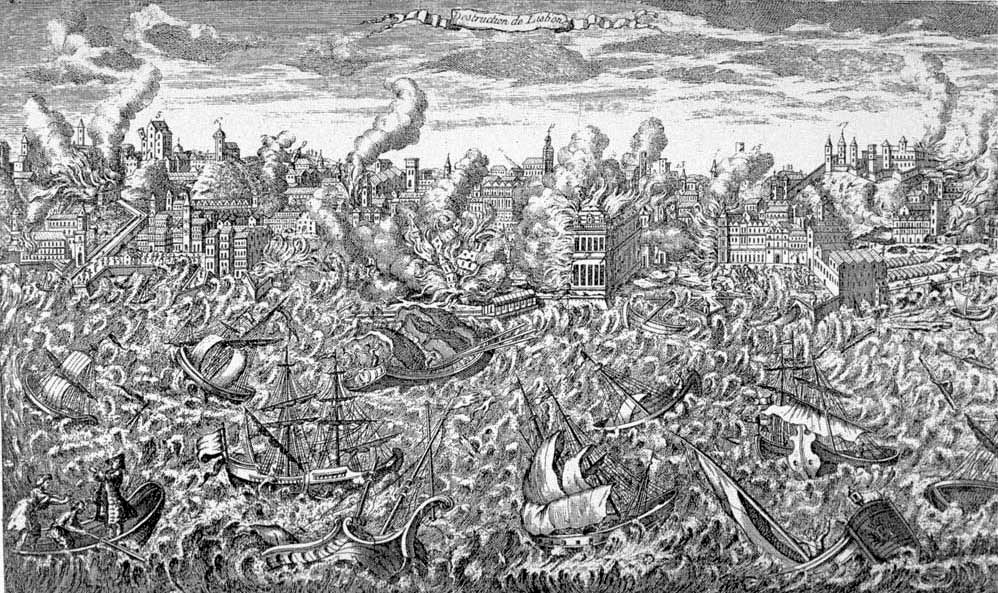
1755 copper engraving showing Lisbon in flames and a tsunami overwhelming the ships in the harbor

Knutzen introduced Kant to Newtonianism. Kant was a champion of the Enlightenment who wrote Idea for a Universal History with a Cosmopolitan Purpose (1784) and adopted the phrase Sapere aude (Dare to know) in his essay "Answering the Question: What Is Enlightenment?" (1784).

Kant published three separate texts on the 1755 Lisbon earthquake, theorizing its cause was shifts in large caverns filled with hot gases. While inaccurate, this early attempt to naturally explain earthquakes represents probably "the beginnings of scientific geography in Germany. And certainly the beginnings of seismology". Kant also wrote on anthropology in Anthropology from a Pragmatic Point of View (1798).

Early critics of Kant's "thing-in-itself" include Eberhard, Friedrich Bouterwek (1766–1828), and rational realist Christoph Gottfried Bardili (1761–1808).

== 19th century ==
=== German idealism ===
Growing out of Kant's work, German idealism was a late 18th and 19th century movement, linked to both the Enlightenment's revolutionary politics, and to German Romanticism, which was associated with the Counter-Enlightenment. Besides Kant, the prominent German idealists were Johann Gottlieb Fichte (1762–1814), Friedrich Wilhelm Joseph Schelling (1770–1831), and most notably Georg Wilhelm Friedrich Hegel (1770–1831).

The French Revolution occurred in 1789. The 19th century in Germany saw the Napoleonic Wars (1803–1815), revolutions of 1830 and 1848, and Unification of Germany and German Empire (proclaimed January 18, 1871) led by Otto von Bismarck following the Franco-Prussian War (1870).

==== Hamann and Herder ====
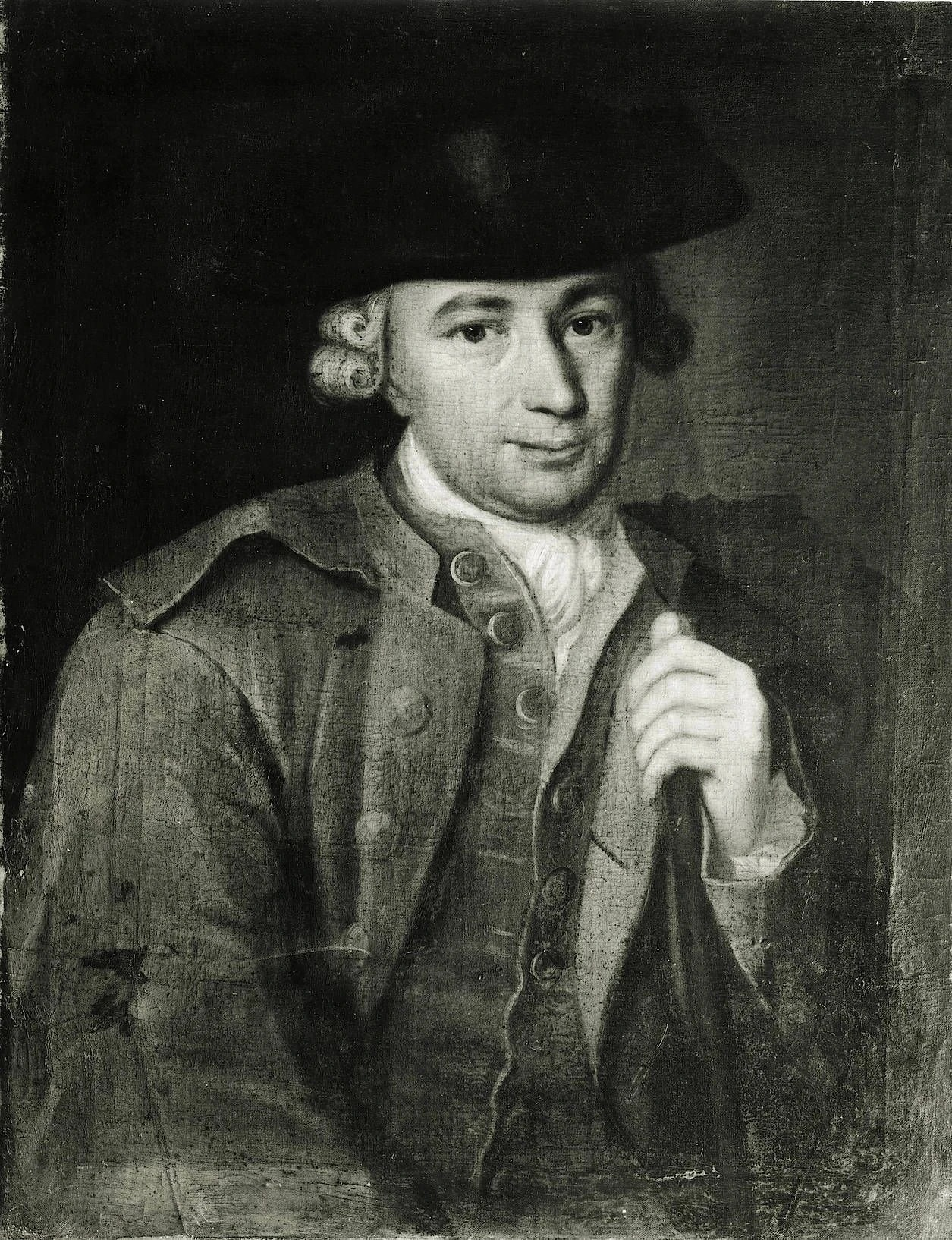
Johann Georg Hamann

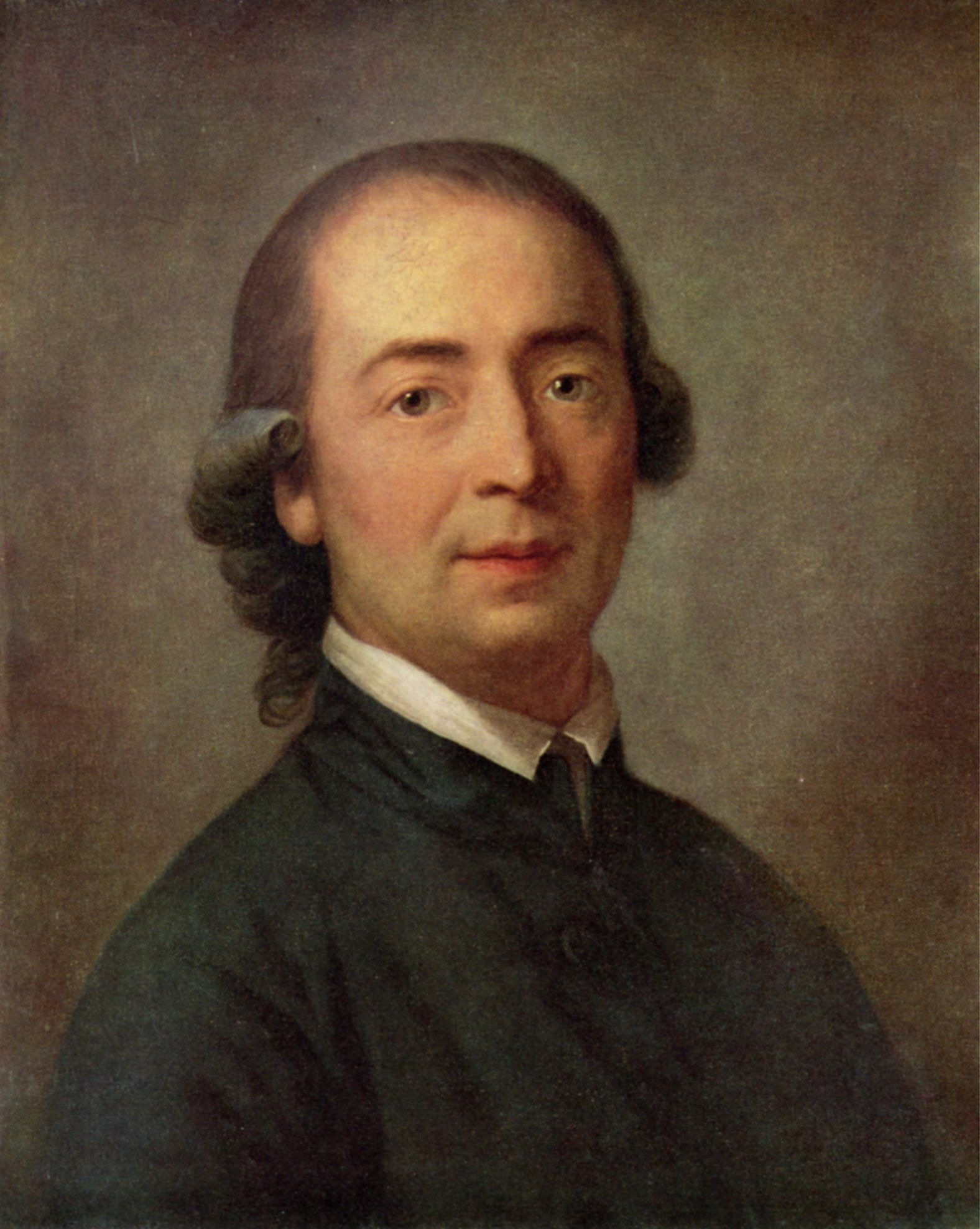
Johann Gottfried Herder

Johann Georg Hamann (1730–1788) and Johann Gottfried Herder (1744–1803) influenced both Romanticism and the proto-Romantic Sturm und Drang movement.

Hamann wrote Socratic Memorabilia (1759), comparing Socratic ignorance with religious faith. His most notable contributions were to philosophy of language. He stated "Reason is language".

Kant read Hamann's translation of Scottish skeptic philosopher David Hume (1711–1776), whose criticism of causation in Enquiry Concerning Human Understanding (1739) Kant credited for awakening him from his "dogmatic slumber". Maimon attempted an intermediate position between Hume and Kant. Hamann also introduced Kant to the work of French philosophe Jean-Jacques Rousseau (1712–1778), whose portrait hung in Kant's home, and whom Kant called "Newton of the moral world".

Hamann's student Herder won a Berlin Academy prize essay contest and subsequently published Treatise on the Origin of Language (1772). Herder was one of the first to argue language shapes thought, and his vitalism also revived philosophy of mind. (Note: Herder disputed the ruins of Persepolis with Göttingen professor Arnold Hermann Ludwig Heeren (1760–1842), arguing they were of Jamshid origin rather than Achaemenid. Depictions of the ruins of Persepolis had been provided by explorers and travelers like Engelbert Kämpfer, Jean Chardin, Cornelis de Bruijn, and Carsten Niebuhr.)

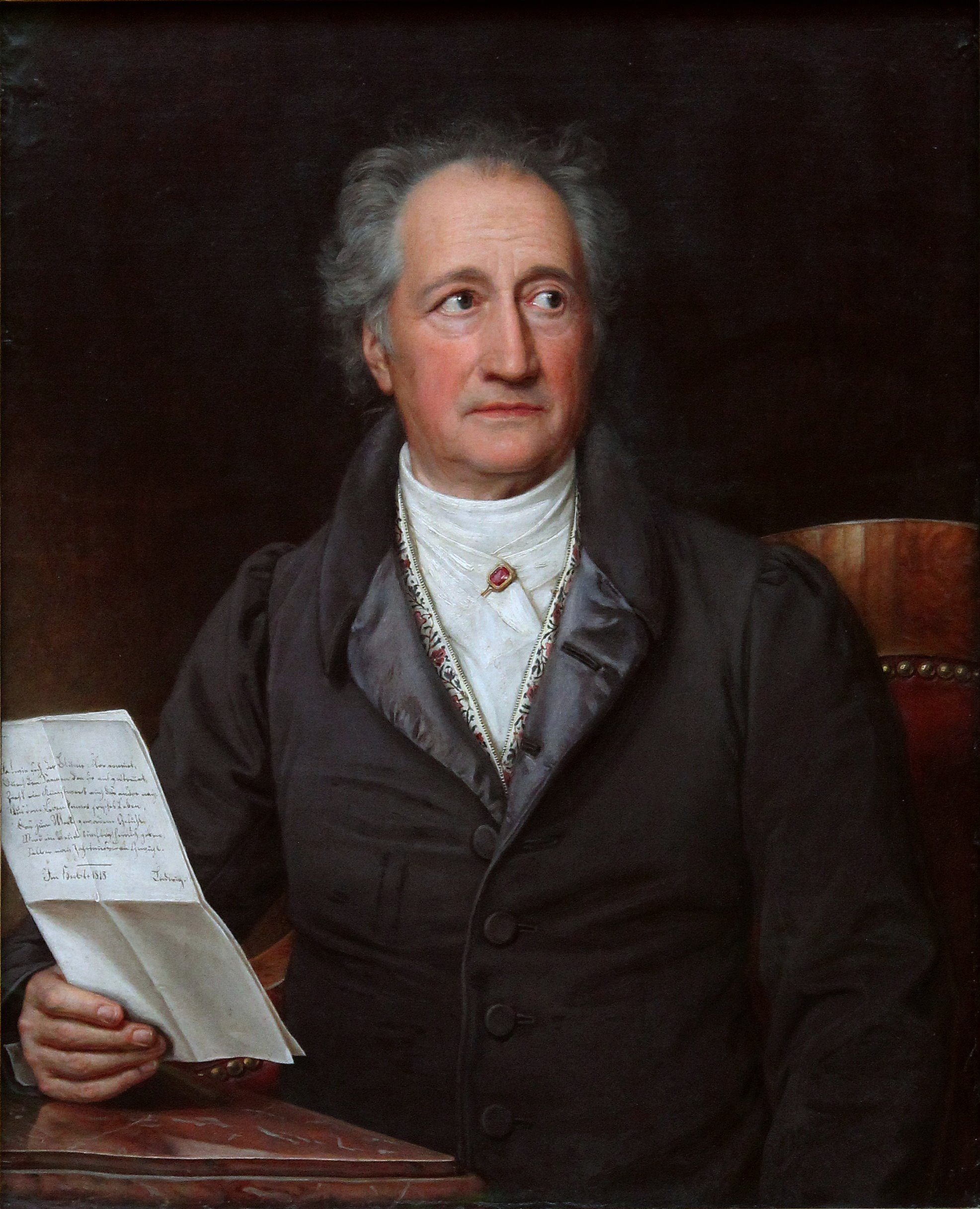
Johann Wolfgang von Goethe practiced natural philosophy.

Herder influenced Wilhelm von Humboldt (1767–1835), who similarly saw language as creative rather than merely representative; and is a namesake of the Humboldt University of Berlin, along with his brother, polymath Alexander von Humboldt (1769–1859). Herder also influenced Franz Bopp (1791–1876) and the Brothers Grimm, Jakob (1785–1863) and Wilhelm (1786–1859).

==== Goethe ====
An early participant in Sturm und Drang and Weimar Classicism was Institut namesake and polymath Johann Wolfgang von Goethe (1749–1832), widely regarded as the most influential German writer for such works as the play Faust (1808) and novels Wilhelm Meister (1796) and Werther (1774). Goethe's comments and observations also form the basis of several biographical works, most notably Johann Peter Eckermann's Conversations with Goethe (1836).

Goethe was additionally a natural philosopher who criticized Linnaean taxonomy and published his own work on morphology, the Metamorphosis of Plants (1790). Goethe advocated the law of compensation, "in order to spend on one side, nature is forced to economize on the other side." He also published the Theory of Colours (1810), opposing Newton's theory found in Opticks.

Goethe's friend Friedrich Schiller (1759–1805) taught at the University of Jena (now Friedrich Schiller University Jena). Schiller's teacher was Jacob Friedrich von Abel (1751–1829) of Tübingen.

==== Romanticism ====
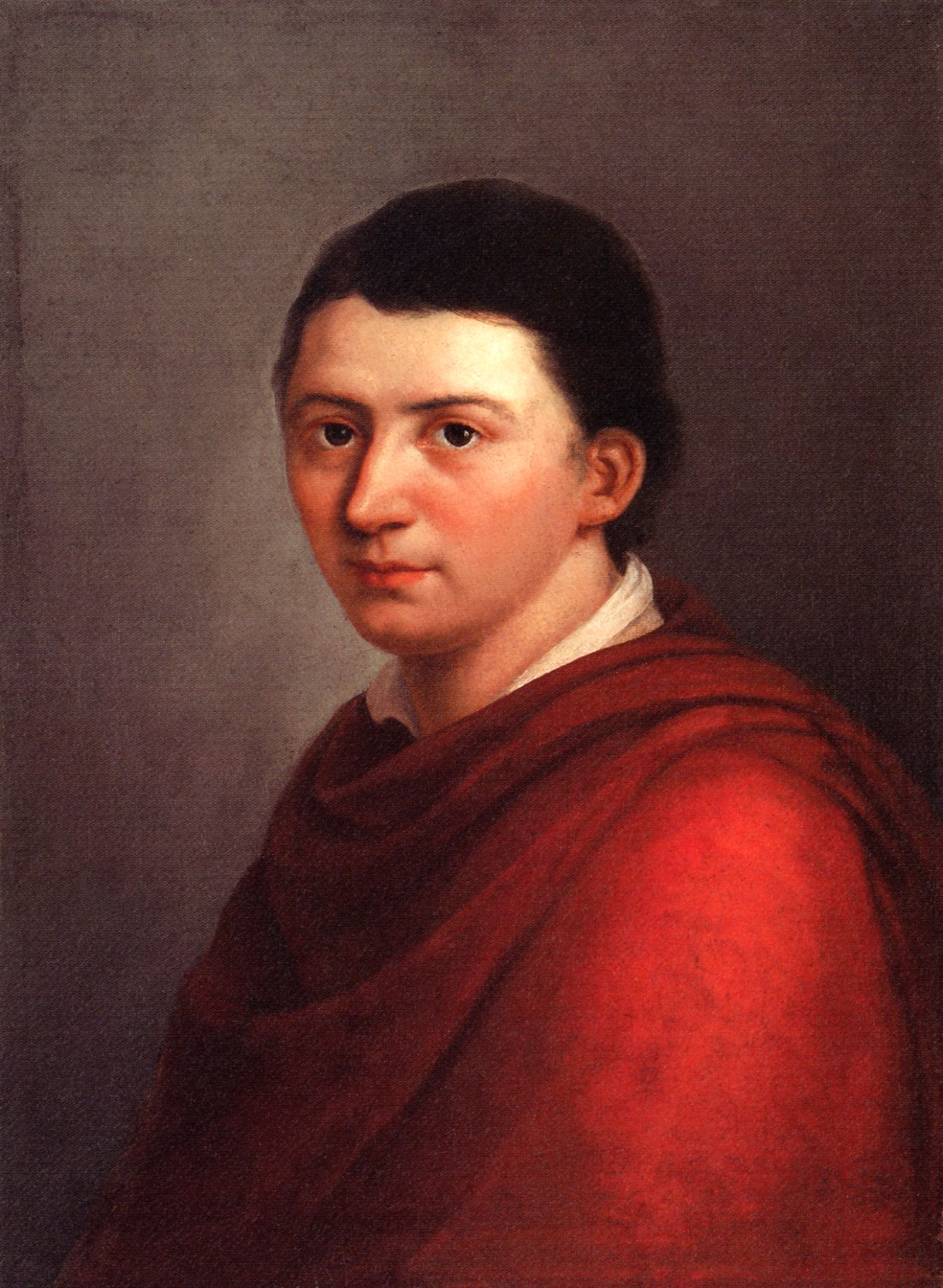
Friedrich Schlegel was a romanticist.

The Early Romantics centered in Jena included brothers Karl Wilhelm Friedrich Schlegel (1772–1829) and August Wilhelm Schlegel (1767–1845), poets Friedrich Hölderlin (1770–1843), Novalis (1772–1801), and Ludwig Tieck (1773–1853), theologian Friedrich Schleiermacher (1768–1834), and platonic realist August Ludwig Hülsen (1765–1809).

===== Schlegel brothers =====
Friedrich Schlegel coined the term historicism, claiming neoclassicist art historian Johann Joachim Winckelmann (1717–1768) started a new philosophical era, recognizing the unique character of antiquity. The Schlegel brothers founded the journal Athenaeum and influenced conservative Adam Müller (1779–1829).

===== Romantic poets =====
Hölderlin was a Hellenophile influenced by Goethe, who attended the Tübinger Stift with Schelling and Hegel, and wrote the novel Hyperion (1799). Novalis was a magical idealist. Tieck published tragic author Heinrich von Kleist (1777–1811).

===== Schleiermacher =====
Schleiemacher argued the true essence of religion lies not in the active love of one’s neighbor, but in passive contemplation of the infinite. Schleiermacher wondered whether hermeneutics, interpreting religious and other texts, was a collection of ad hoc pieces of advice for the solution of specific problems, or if there was a "general hermeneutics" going beyond exegesis, dealing with the "art of understanding" as such, wherever it occurs.

Schleiermacher also contributed to the history of philosophy as "the pioneer of Heraclitean studies" and by challenging the notion of Plato's unwritten doctrines then popular at Tübingen. Schleiermacher taught polymath Hermann Grassmann (1809–1877).

==== Fichte ====
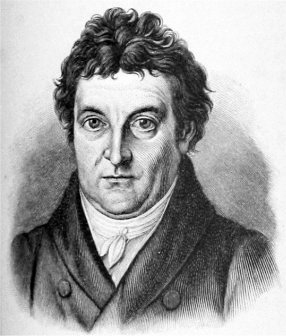
Johann Gottlieb Fichte was a subjective idealist.

Fichte was a subjective idealist rejecting even the "thing-in-itself" in works like Foundations of the Science of Knowledge (1795) and The Vocation of Man (1799). Fichte states the starting point of his philosophy is the absolute, self-aware, thinking "I", which itself creates the world with all its laws. The University of Jena expelled Fichte on the charge of atheism, leading to the atheism dispute.

Fichte was of pivotal importance for the Romantics. Friedrich Schlegel identified the "three sources of Romanticism": the French Revolution, Fichte's philosophy, and Wilhelm Meister.

Romanticism saw the birth of nationalism and Volkstum, inspired by the likes of Rousseau, Herder, and opposition to French emperor Napoleon and the Wars of Liberation. Fichte is regarded as a founder of modern German nationalism when he expressed the unity of language and nation in his Addresses to the German Nation (1808):

Those who speak the same language are joined to each other by a multitude of invisible bonds by nature herself, long before any human art begins; they understand each other and have the power of continuing to make themselves understood more and more clearly; they belong together and are by nature one and an inseparable whole. ...Only when each people, left to itself, develops and forms itself in accordance with its own peculiar quality, and only when in every people each individual develops himself in accordance with that common quality, as well as in accordance with his own peculiar quality—then, and then only, does the manifestation of divinity appear in its true mirror as it ought to be.

Fichte also influenced On War (1832) author Carl von Clausewitz (1780–1831). Following the French July Revolution (1830) and German Hambach Festival (1832), Heinrich Heine (1797–1856) criticized romanticism and hoped to inspire revolution, writing On the History of Religion and Philosophy in Germany (1834), which attacked On Germany (1813) by Madame de Staël (1766–1817). The period preceding the 1848 revolutions, the Vormärz and Biedermeier era, saw the end of the Romantic era.

==== Schelling ====
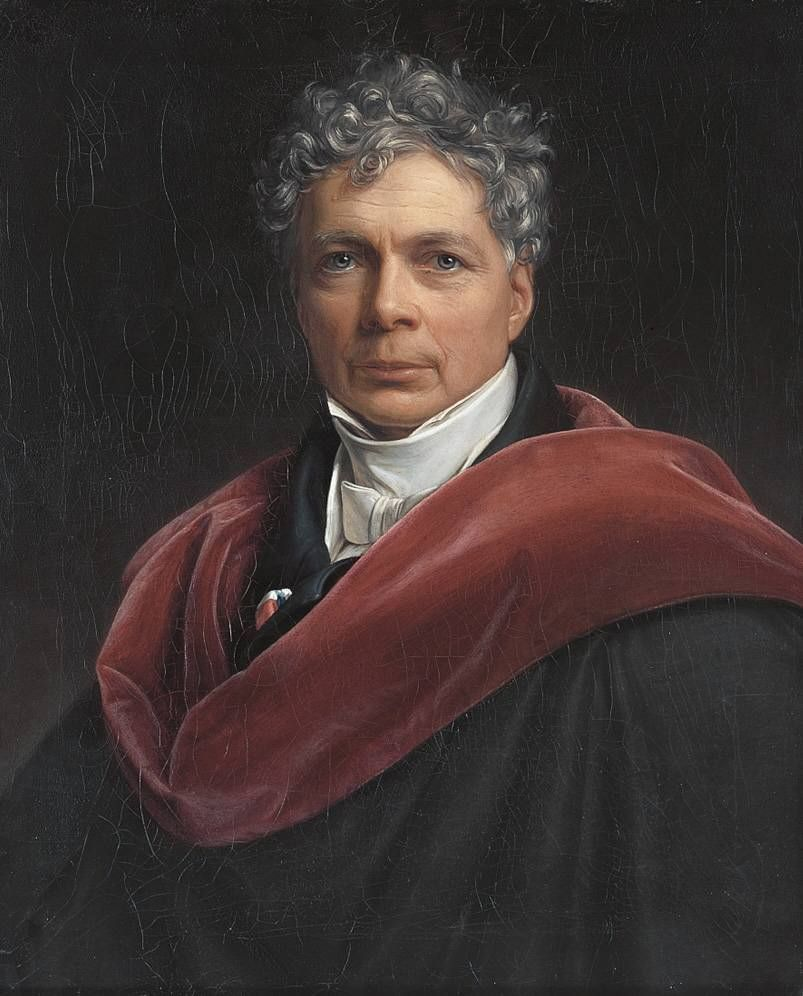
Friedrich Schelling practiced Naturphilosophie.

Schelling initially adhered to Fichte, and associated with the Schlegel brothers, but subsequently created his own philosophy, called by one writer "the first manifestation of irrationalism". Schelling averred "it is a poor objection to a philosopher that he is unintelligible."

Influenced by Böhme and Kant, Schelling advanced organicism and Naturphilosophie, which sees nature as an expression of spiritual powers, expressed in the System of Transcendental Idealism (1800). Schelling believed the absolute, or spiritual basis of nature, develops and eventually dissolves distinctions and contradictions, inaugurating idealist dialectics and Schelling's monist "philosophy of identity." The absolute is immersed in the same passive, motionless state as Schleiermacher's God.

In his early or negative philosophy, such as the posthumously published The Philosophy of Art (1859), Schelling assigns a special role to art, in which freedom and the reality of "higher being" is fully comprehended, as contrasted with nature. The artist is a kind of mystical creature who creates the world with "revelation", both conscious and unconscious intuition, or "inner contemplation." (Note: "In his philosophy of art, Schelling emerged from the subjective boundaries in which Kant concluded aesthetics, referring it only to features of judgment. Schelling's aesthetics, understanding the world as an artistic creation, has adopted a universal character and served as the basis for the teachings of the Romantic school.") In later life, Schelling evolves towards a mythological and mysticist "philosophy of revelation".

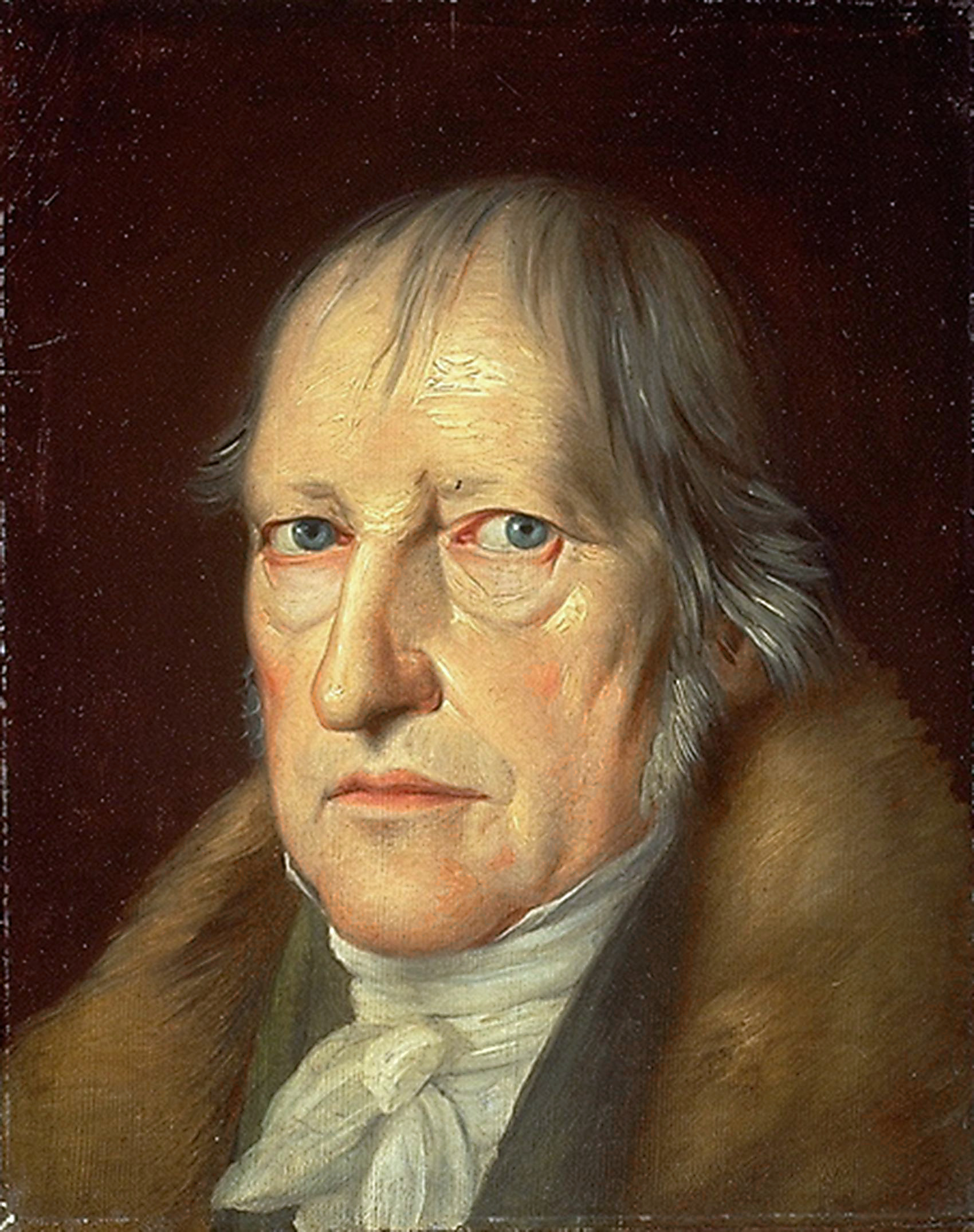
G. W. F. Hegel was an absolute idealist.

Schelling influenced Karl Christian Friedrich Krause (1781–1832), who founded Krausism, another "philosophy of identity". Krausism was panentheism, and influential in Restoration Spain.

==== Hegel ====
Hegel, a protégé of von Abel and influenced by Böhme, built a system of absolute idealism. Hegel thought the world was always in motion and contradictory; (Note: Graham Priest explains Hegel's account of motion as being both here and not here.) a dialectic typically presented as a three-stage process of thesis, antithesis, and synthesis.

The absolute is expressed in self-knowledge, which increasingly presents itself in history. Hegel traces its development in three main stages in The Phenomenology of Spirit (1807). The first stage of the absolute is logical concepts, set forth in The Science of Logic (1812–1816). The second stage is nature, expounded in the "Philosophy of Nature" entry from the Encyclopedia of the Philosophical Sciences (1817). The highest, third stage is spirit, presented in art, religion, and philosophy, as revealed in "Philosophy of Spirit" from the Encyclopedia, and his University of Berlin lectures, covering material not found in his published writings. (Note: An enigmatic work published by Franz Rosenzweig is known as "The Oldest Systematic Program of German Idealism." It seems to be Schelling's work, but in Hegel's handwriting.)

The Lectures on the Philosophy of History and Elements of the Philosophy of Right (1821) contain Hegel's political philosophy.

==== Jacobi ====
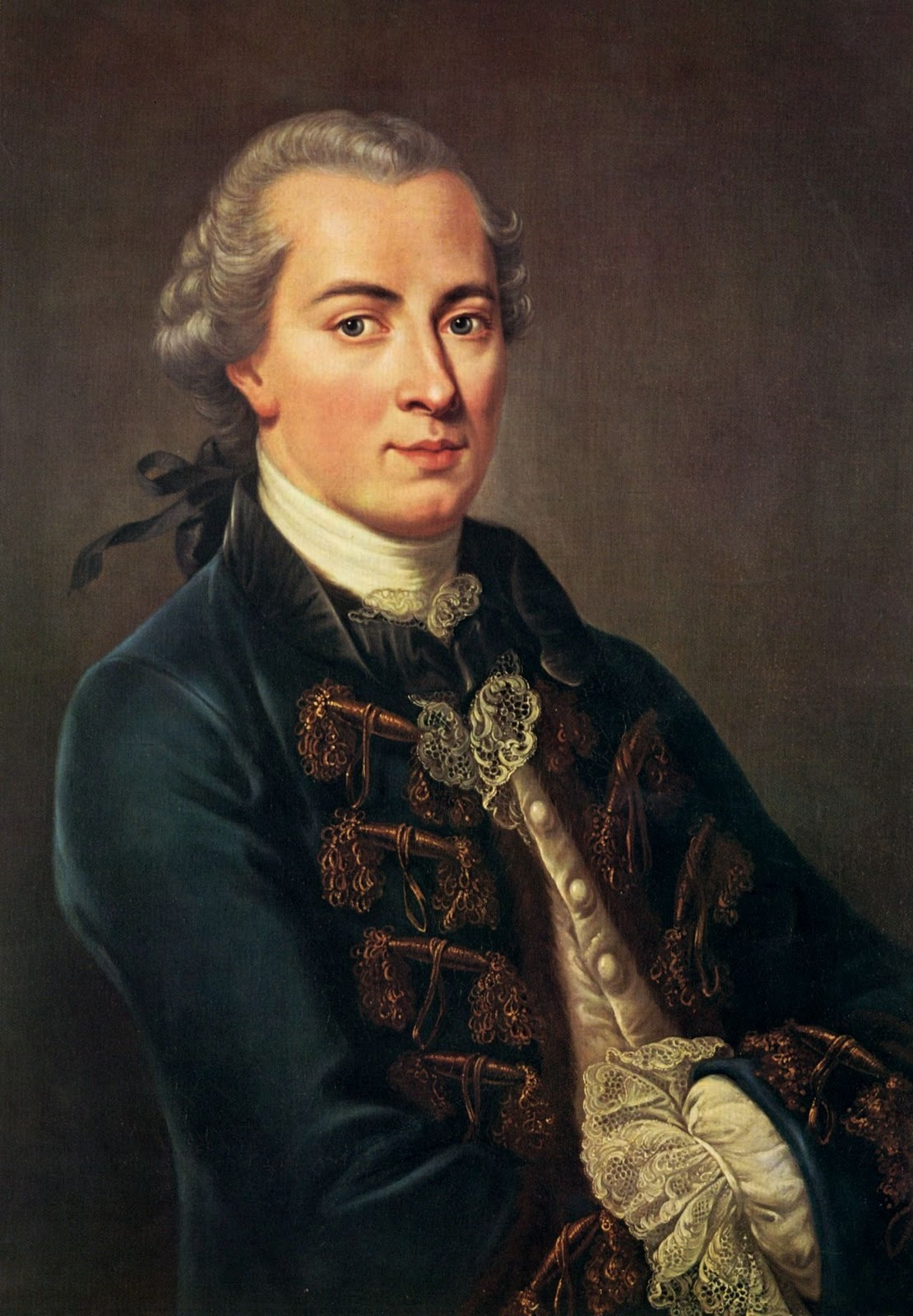
Friedrich Heinrich Jacobi opposed nihilism.

Friedrich Heinrich Jacobi (1743–1819) debated the pantheism controversy with Mendelssohn, a result of Lessing privately avowing Spinozism. After Fichte was accused of atheism, Jacobi further explicated his view that the Enlightenment and philosophy led to nihilism, popularizing the concept. Jacobi advocated fideism (faith and revelation) instead of speculative reason. Pietist Thomas Wizenmann (1759–1787) was a disciple.

Danish philosopher Søren Kierkegaard (1813–1855) was influenced by Jacobi and is widely considered to be the first existentialist philosopher. Kierkegaard believed religion required a leap of faith (salto mortale). According to one writer, Kierkegaard's views on philosophy and aesthetics were also an offshoot of Romanticism.

==== Reinhold ====
Karl Leonhard Reinhold (1757–1823) was one of the best known popularizers of Kant with Letters on the Kantian Philosophy (1787). Reinhold advanced "elementary philosophy" which held the first principle of philosophy is "the principle of consciousness" that there is a subject, object, and a relation between them.

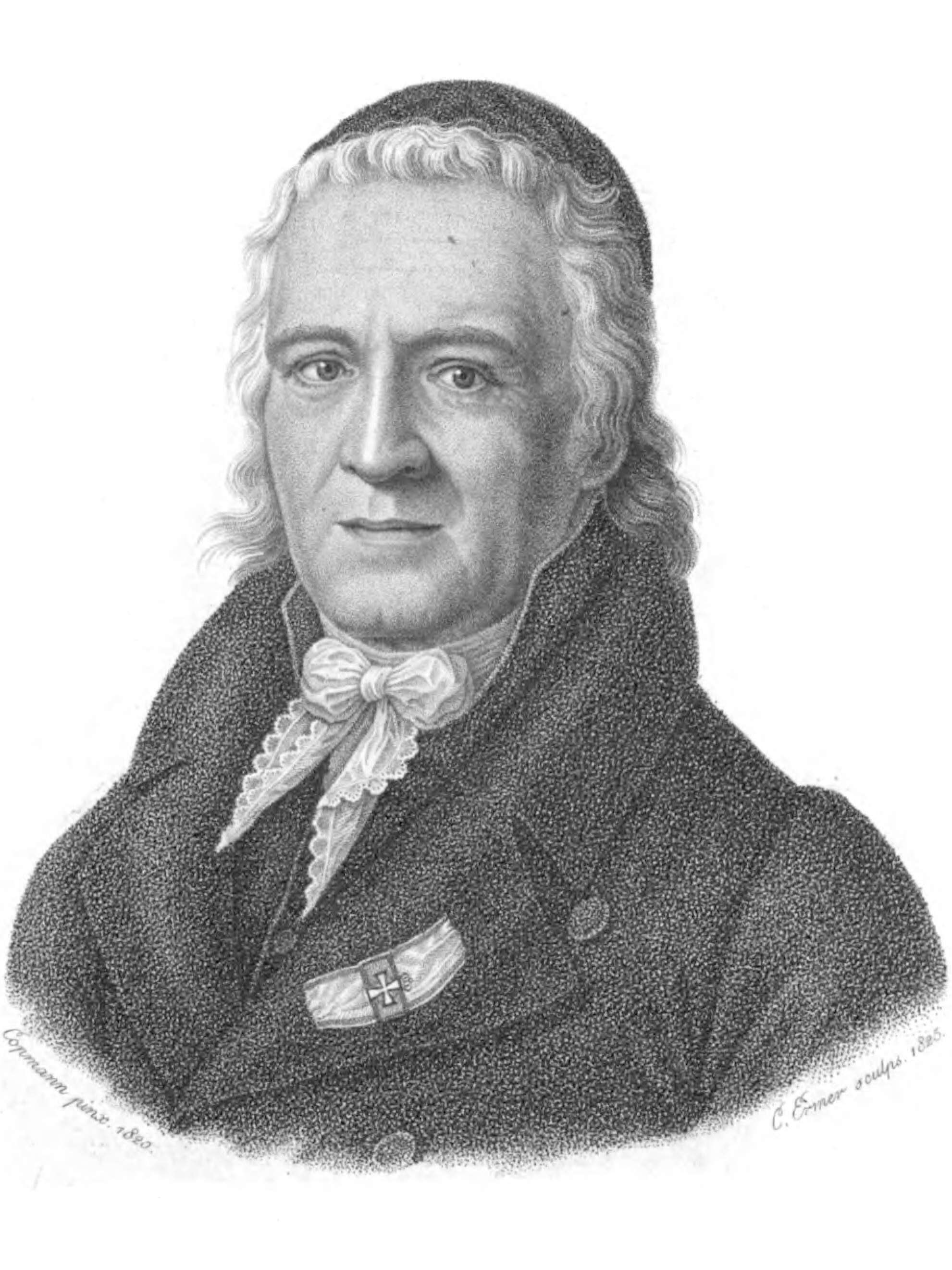
Karl Leonhard Reinhold, popularizer of Kant.

Reinhold influenced Friedrich Adolf Trendelenburg (1802–1872), who as well as German idealism defended Aristotelian philosophy and teleology. His student, ethical activist Rudolf Christoph Eucken (1846–1926), won the 1908 Nobel Prize in Literature.

=== Hegelianism ===
Hegel was highly influential throughout the nineteenth century. Two distinct groups of Hegelians can be roughly divided into the more conservative 'right', or 'old', Hegelians, and the politically and religiously radical 'left', or 'young', Hegelians. The groups were not as unified or self-conscious as the labels 'right' and 'left' make them appear. The term was first used by David Strauss (1808–1874) to describe Bruno Bauer (1809–1882)—who actually was a typically 'Left', or Young, Hegelian. Schelling was invited by Prussian king Friedrich Wilhelm IV to a University of Berlin professorship to combat the Young Hegelians.

==== Right Hegelians ====
The Right Hegelians were Hegel's successors at the University of Heidelberg and University of Berlin, including Karl Daub (1765–1836), Hermann Friedrich Wilhelm Hinrichs (1794–1861), Leopold von Henning (1791–1866), and Heinrich Gustav Hotho (1802–1873). In Judas Ischariot (1816), Daub writes Judas Iscariot was "an incarnation of the devil". Hotho compiled Hegel's posthumously published Lectures on Aesthetics (1835).

Hermann Lotze was a teleological idealist.

The Right Hegelians believed the dialectic of history had come to an end—Hegel's Phenomenology of Spirit reveals itself to be the culmination of history. Hegel's thought that reason and freedom had reached their zenith in the existing Prussian state was viewed as a paradox, at best; the Prussian regime provided extensive civil and social services, good universities, high employment, and some industrialization, but it was considered rather backward compared with the more liberal constitutional monarchies of France and Britain.

===== Speculative theism =====
Speculative theism was an 1830s movement closely related to, but distinguished from, Right Hegelianism. Its proponents Immanuel Hermann Fichte (1796–1879), Christian Hermann Weisse (1801–1866), and Hermann Ulrici (1806–1884) were united in their demand to recover the "personal God" after panrationalist Hegelianism.

Weisse and panpsychist Gustav Fechner (1801–1887) taught anti-psychologism advocate and logician Hermann Lotze (1817–1881). Lotze criticized vitalism, proposing teleological idealism and the principle of teleomechanism, that mechanism is compatible with teleology. Lotze influenced personalists, theologian Albrecht Ritschl (1822–1889), and perspectivist Gustav Teichmuller (1832–1888).

==== Young Hegelians ====
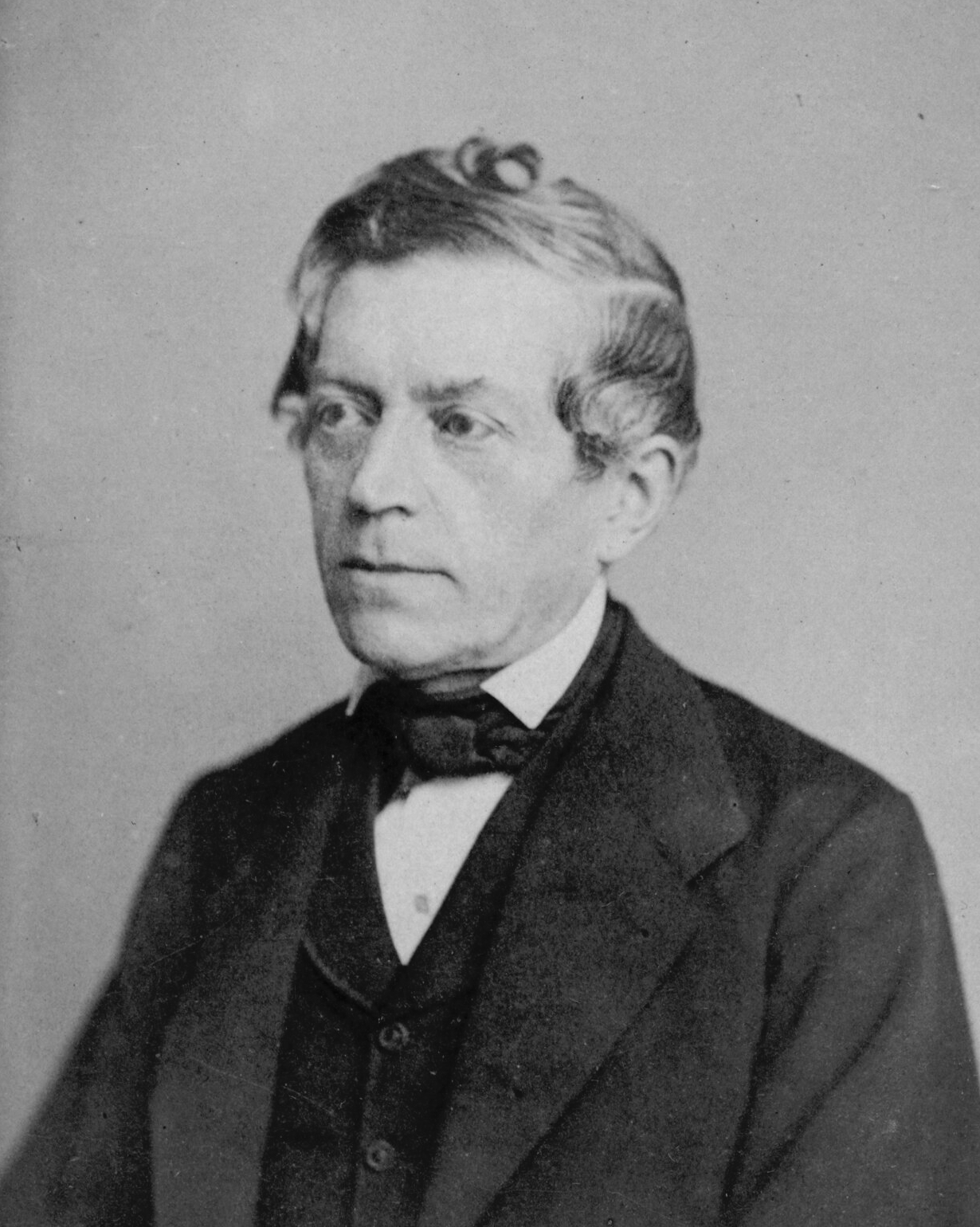
David Strauss

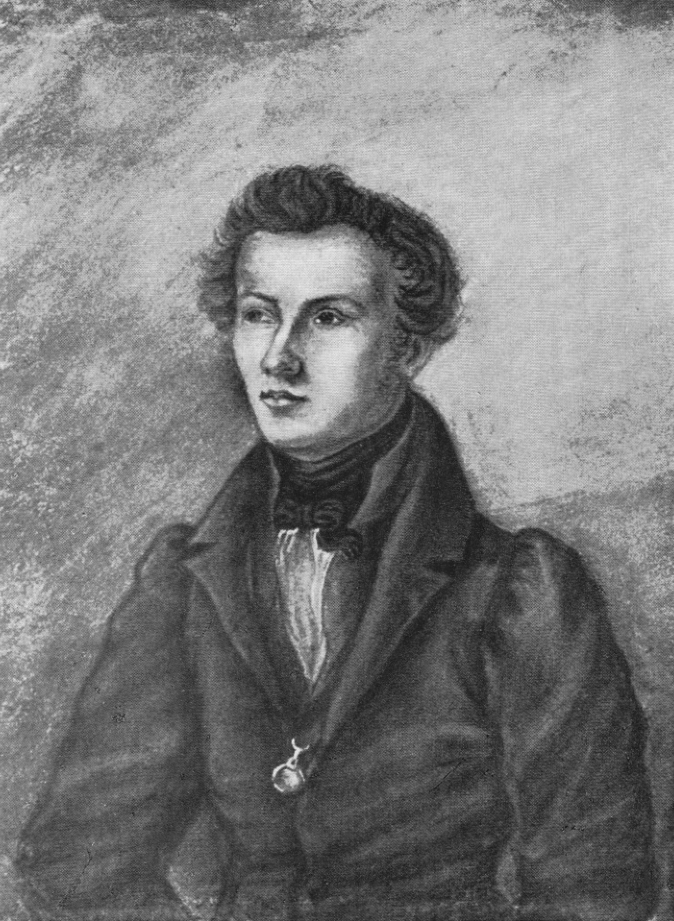
Bruno Bauer

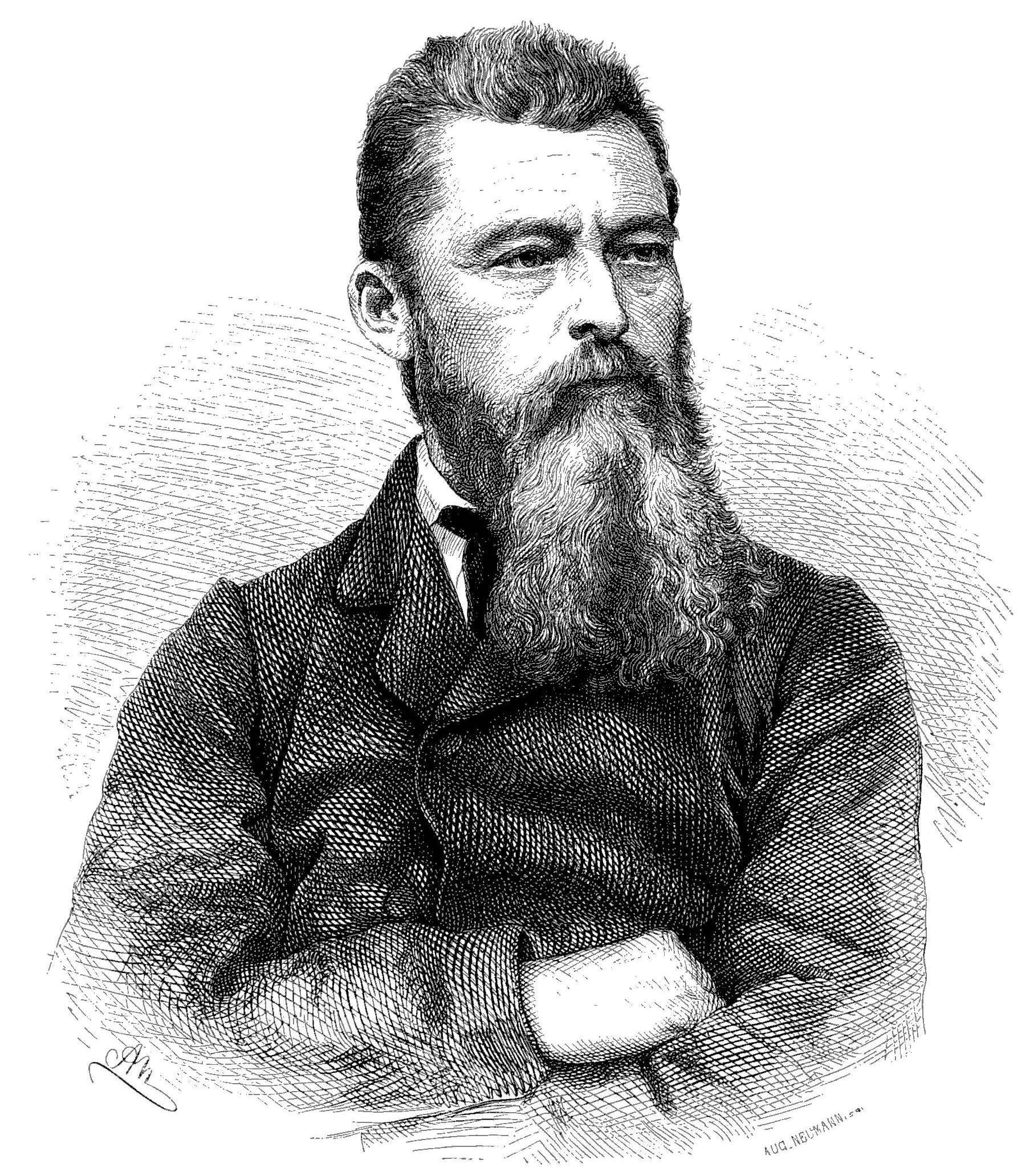
Ludwig Feuerbach

Max Stirner

Members of the Young Hegelians

The Young Hegelians included Strauss, Bauer, Ludwig Feuerbach (1804–1872), and Max Stirner (1806–1856). They rejected utopian aspects of Hegelianism that "Old Hegelians" had interpreted to mean the world had already essentially reached perfection.

They drew on Hegel's idea that the purpose and promise of history was the rejection of everything restricting freedom and reason; and they proceeded to mount radical critiques, first of religion and then of the Prussian political system. They felt Hegel's belief in the end of history conflicted with other aspects of his thought. They also felt the dialectic was certainly not complete, given the irrationality of religious beliefs and the apparent lack of political and religious freedom in Prussian society.

Strauss was a pioneer in the historical investigation of Jesus and connected to the Tübingen School historical-critical method, led by Ferdinand Christian Baur (1792–1860), who taught Jakob Friedrich Reiff (1810–1879), teacher of Edmund Pfleiderer (1842–1902), brother of Otto Pfleiderer (1839–1908).

Bauer was a critic of both Judaism and Christianity and a central figure in the intellectual circles of the Vormärz. Feuerbach wrote The Essence of Christianity (1841), arguing God is anthropomorphizing. Feuerbach influenced positivist Friedrich Jodl (1849–1914). Stirner was an anarchist.

===== Materialism =====
Many post-1848 intellectuals abandoned metaphysics. The materialism controversy challenged conventions in the 1850s. Zoologist Carl Vogt (1817–1895) argued mental processes were entirely physical, stating "thoughts stand in the same relation to the brain as bile does to the liver or urine to the kidneys." Vogt was supported by Ludwig Büchner (1824–1899) and opposed by Rudolf Wagner (1805–1864) and Justus von Liebig (1803–1873).

=== Marx and Engels ===
Young Hegelian Karl Marx (1818–1883) was also influenced by British economics, French socialism, French sociologist August Comte (1798–1857), and Zionist Moses Hess (1812–1875), founding Marxism, which most notably influenced the Bolsheviks in the 20th-century Russian Revolution and Soviet Union. Marx wrote Das Kapital, a critical examination of capitalism.

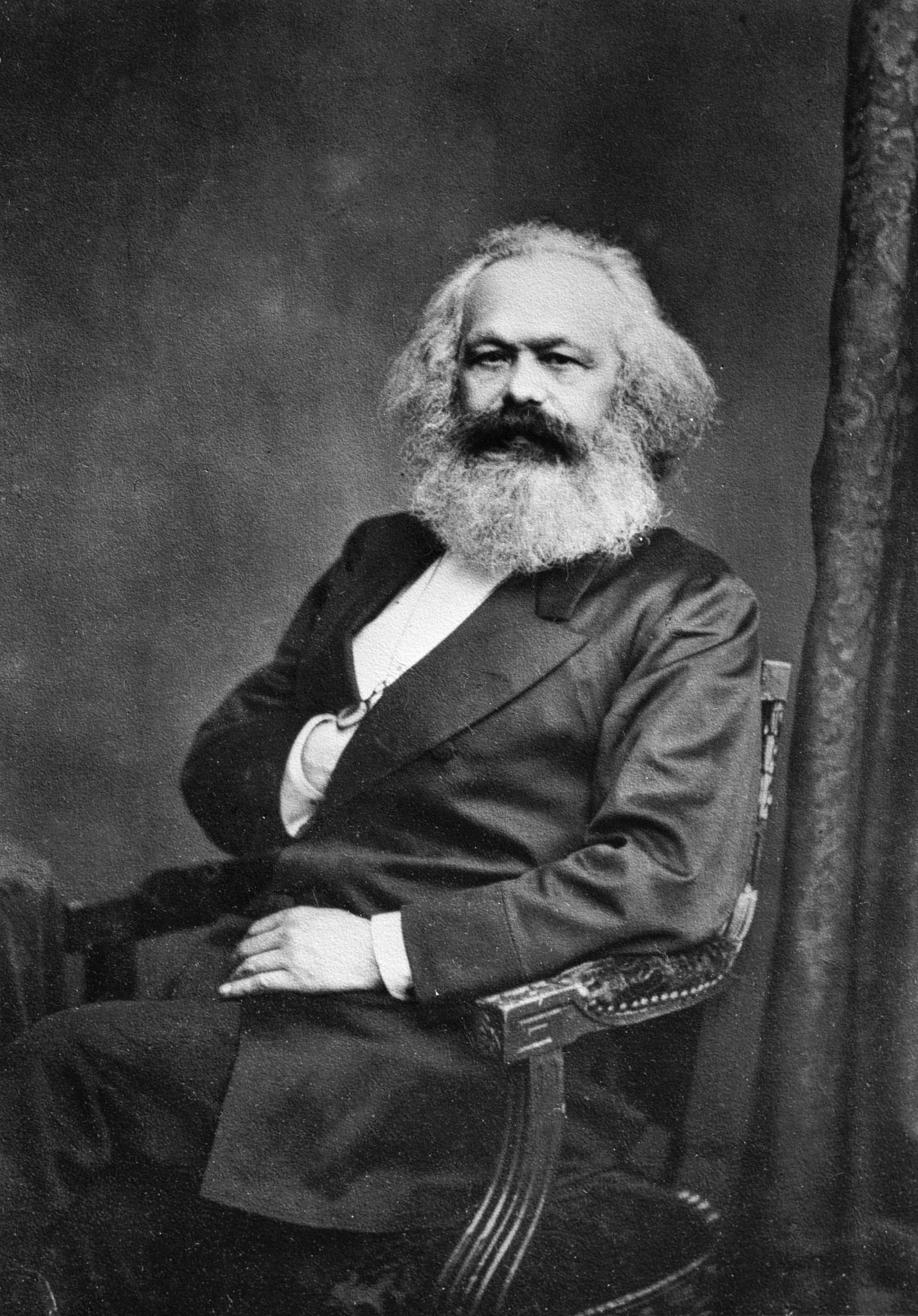
Karl Marx

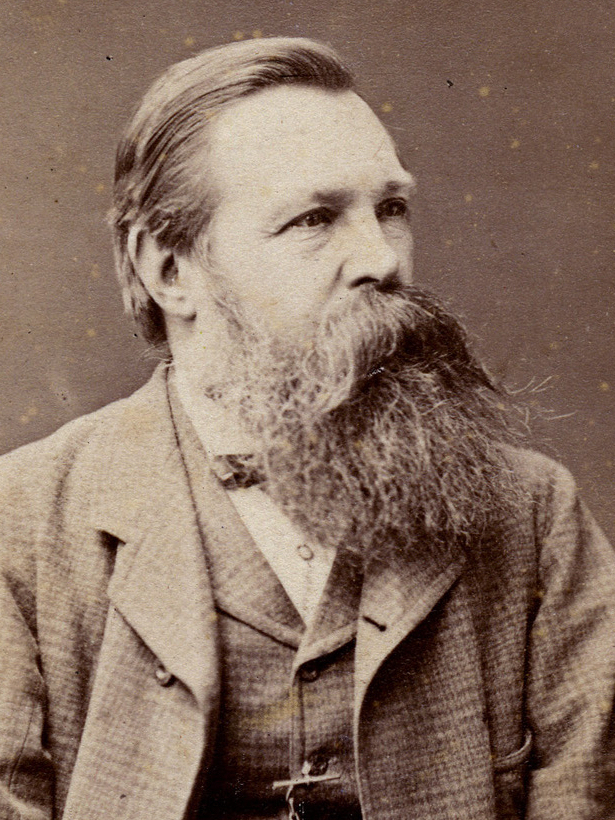
Friedrich Engels

Marx's friend and associate Friedrich Engels (1820–1895), also a Young Hegelian, collaborated with Marx to write the Communist Manifesto (1848). Marx and Engels developed the criticism of private property, theory of class struggle and scientific socialism (communism), and dialectical and historical materialism rather than German idealism. As they wrote in the posthumously published The German Ideology (1932), "In direct contrast to German philosophy which descends from heaven to Earth, here we ascend from Earth to heaven." As Marx similarly said in an afterward in Das Kapital, Hegel "is standing on its head. It must be turned right side up again".

Engels' philosophical works include Ludwig Feuerbach and the End of Classical German Philosophy (1888), which explains how Hegel and Feuerbach led to Marx. There was also The Holy Family (together with Marx, 1844) criticizing the Young Hegelians, Socialism: Utopian and Scientific (1880) studying the utopian socialists and their differences with scientific socialism, Dialectics of Nature (1883) applying Marxism to science, and The Origin of the Family (1884) arguing that the family is an ever-changing institution shaped by capitalism.

==== Dühring ====
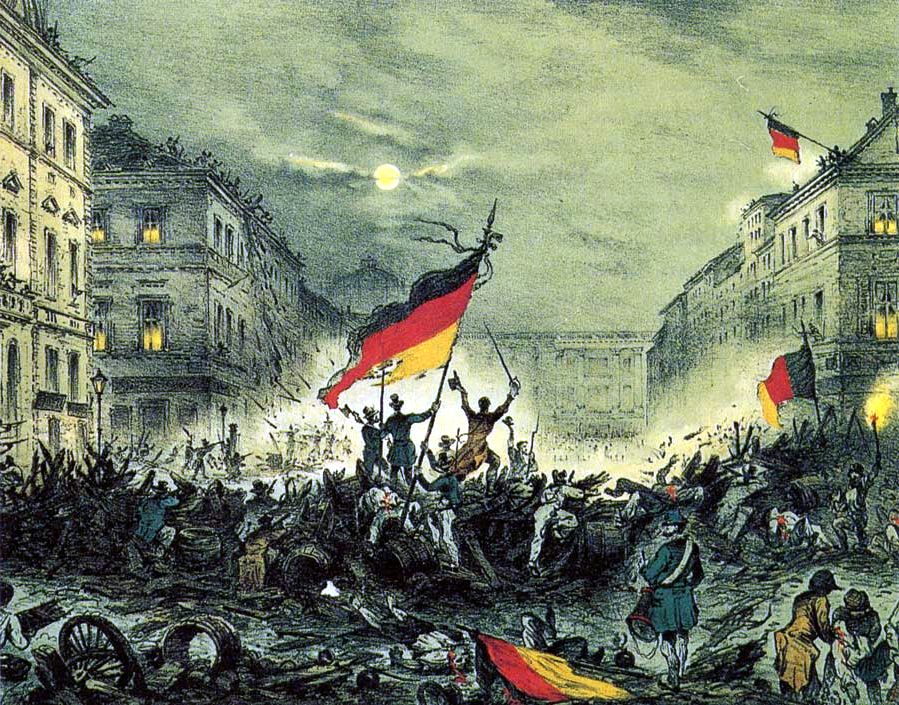
Revolutionaries cheering, 1848

Engels dedicated his entire book Anti-Dühring (1878) to criticizing Dühring's views. Eugen Dühring (1833–1921) was a German socialist, professor of mechanics, philosopher and economist. In philosophy he was an eclectic who combined positivism, mechanistic materialism and idealism into a "philosophy of the actual". Dühring’s views found support among some Social Democrats, most notably revisionist Eduard Bernstein (1850–1932).

==== Dietzgen ====
Joseph Dietzgen (1828–1888) independently came to conclusions very close to those of Marx and Engels. (Note: While sometimes critical, Marx and Engels highly appreciated Dietzgen as a thinker. Marx wrote that Dietzgen expressed “many excellent thoughts, and as a product of the independent thinking of a worker, worthy of amazement.” Engels echoed Marx, “And it is remarkable that we were not alone in discovering this materialistic dialectic, which for many years now has been our best tool of labor and our sharpest weapon; the German worker Joseph Dietzgen rediscovered it independently of us and even independently of Hegel.”) After the revolution of 1848 he emigrated to America, and then went to Russia in 1864. Working in a tannery in St. Petersburg, Dietzgen devoted all his leisure time to philosophy, political economy and socialism. He wrote a large philosophical treatise, The Essence of the Mental Labor of Man (1869), a review of the first volume of Das Kapital. Dietzgen then returned to Germany, and again moved to America, where he wrote Excursions of a Socialist in the Field of the Theory of Knowledge (1887) and Acquisition of Philosophy (1895).

==== Academic socialism ====
Kathedersozialismus (armchair socialism) or academic socialism was a German university trend in the second half of the 19th century, with views similar to those of the British Fabian socialists. Academic socialism supported a version of Bismarck’s welfare state, seeking to prove socialism could be built in Prussian Germany through reform, without the revolutionary overthrow of capitalism and the state, thus rejecting the Marxist notion of class struggle. In 1872 they formed the "Union of Social Policy".

The most notable academic socialist in Germany was social democrat Ferdinand Lassalle (1825–1864). Most of its adherents were economists and sociologists belonging to the “Historical School”, such as anti-Marxist and "older" leader Bruno Hildebrand (1812–1878), "younger" leader Gustav von Schmoller (1838–1917), Adolph Wagner (1835–1917), Lujo Brentano (1844–1931), Hans Delbrück (1848–1929), Ferdinand Toennies (1855–1936), and Werner Sombart (1863–1941).

=== Schopenhauer ===
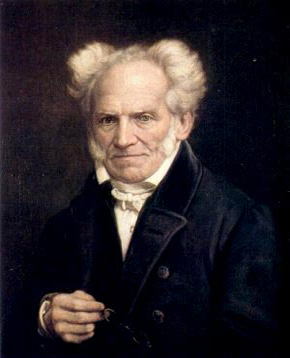
Arthur Schopenhauer, a pessimist philosopher

Arthur Schopenhauer (1788–1860) was an opponent of Hegel influenced by Eastern and Hindu philosophy, introduced to Germany with Friedrich Schlegel's On the language and wisdom of the Indians (1808). Schopenhauer's teacher was Gottlob Ernst Schulze (1761–1833), who wrote Aenesidemus (1792), a skeptical polemic against Kant and Reinhold. Leibniz also influenced Schopenhauer, whose dissertation was On the Fourfold Root of the Principle of Sufficient Reason (1813).

Schopenhauer followed Kant but concluded introspection was a way to access the thing-in-itself. Schopenhauer's most influential work, The World as Will and Representation (1818), claimed at the heart of the world and man lies the “will to life.” Schopenhauer is seen as foreshadowing the work of psychologist Sigmund Freud (1856–1939) and the unconscious mind.

Schopenhauer was a pessimist whose analysis of will led him to believe that desires can never be fulfilled. Consequently, he eloquently described a lifestyle of abandoning desires, similar to the asceticism of Buddhist Nirvana, Vedanta, and the Desert Fathers of early Christianity. Schopenhauer also thought art could alleviate suffering.

Post-Schopenhauerian pessimism became a popular trend, but viewed with disdain by other contemporary popular philosophies; the typical pessimist was seen as detriment to society opposed to revolution and science. Philosophers responding to this growing criticism included Julius Bahnsen (1830–1881), Karl Robert Eduard von Hartmann (1842–1906), and Philipp Mainländer (1841–1876). (Note: Beiser reviews the commonly held position that Schopenhauer was a transcendental idealist and he rejects it: "Though it is deeply heretical from the standpoint of transcendental idealism, Schopenhauer's objective standpoint involves a form of transcendental realism, i.e. the assumption of the independent reality of the world of experience.")

==== Mainländer ====
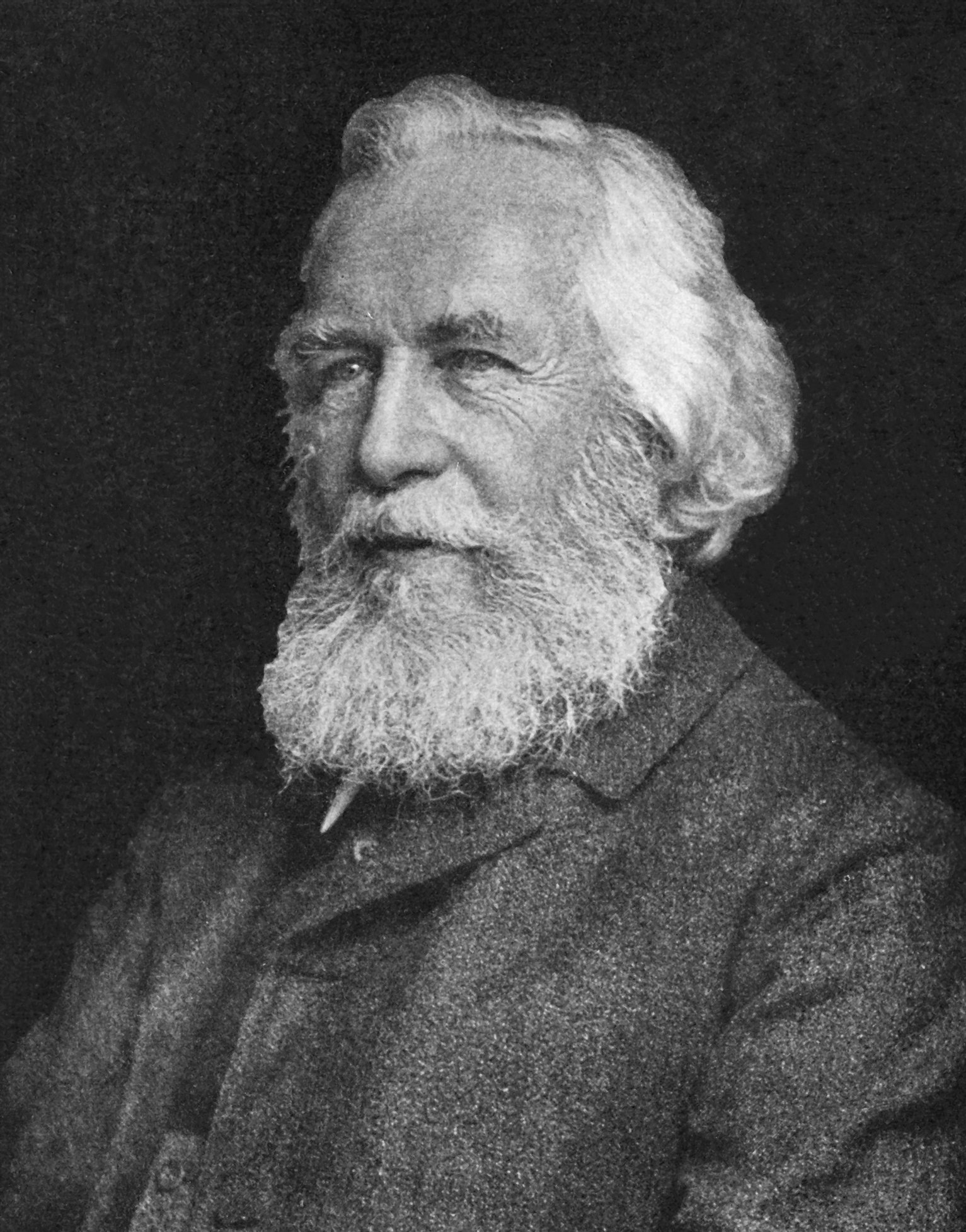
Ernst Haeckel

Philipp Mainländer similarly sees the will as the first principle. However, with Schopenhauer, the will is singular, unified, and beyond time and space, while Mainländer instead believed in pluralism. Mainländer also believed in salvation for all of creation. With Schopenhauer, the silencing of the will is a rare event. The artistic genius can achieve this temporarily, but only a few saints have sustained it. For Mainländer, the whole cosmos is slowly but surely moving towards silencing the will-to-live and "redemption". The appendix to Mainländer's The Philosophy of Redemption contains the "Critique of the Doctrines of Kant and Schopenhauer". (Note: Mainländer committed suicide by hanging the day after the publication of his masterwork, believing it was the ultimate fulfillment of his own philosophy.)

=== Haeckel ===
Ernst Haeckel (1834–1919) introduced to Germany Charles Darwin's theory of evolution, as found in On the Origin of Species (1859). Haeckel propounded recapitulation theory, or "ontogeny recapitulates phylogeny", and was also a monist. Haeckel was opposed by neo-vitalist Hans Driesch (1867–1941).

=== Neo-Kantianism ===
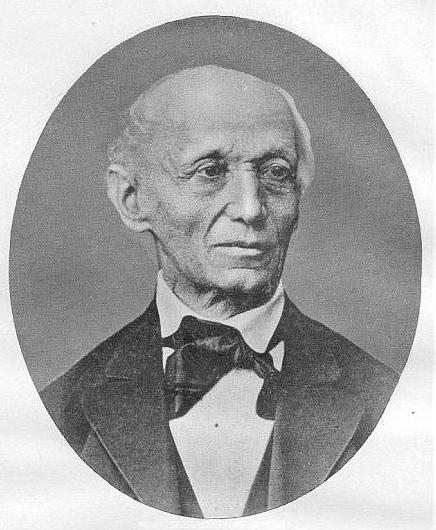
Eduard Zeller was a Neo-Kantian.

Neo-Kantianism was a late 19th-century revival of Kant's philosophy, influenced especially by Schopenhauer's criticism, as well as by other philosophers such as Jakob Friedrich Fries (1773–1843) and Johann Friedrich Herbart (1776–1841). Otto Liebmann (1840–1912) urged going "back to Kant".

The neo-Kantians preferred scientific readings of Kant and emphasized understanding over sensibility; and made early use of such philosophical terminology as "epistemology", upholding its prominence over ontology. Eduard Zeller (1814–1908) combined Neo-Kantianism with the methods of the Tübingen School. The Neo-Kantians influenced socialists such as Eduard Bernstein and the Austromarxists.

==== Marburg school ====
Friedrich Albert Lange (1828–1875) influenced Hermann Cohen (1842–1918), who led the Marburg School, which emphasized epistemology and philosophical logic, and included Paul Natorp (1854–1924), symbolism theorist Ernst Cassirer (1874–1945), and Nicolai Hartmann (1882–1950). Cohen's friend was existentialist Franz Rosenzweig (1886–1929).

==== Southwest school ====
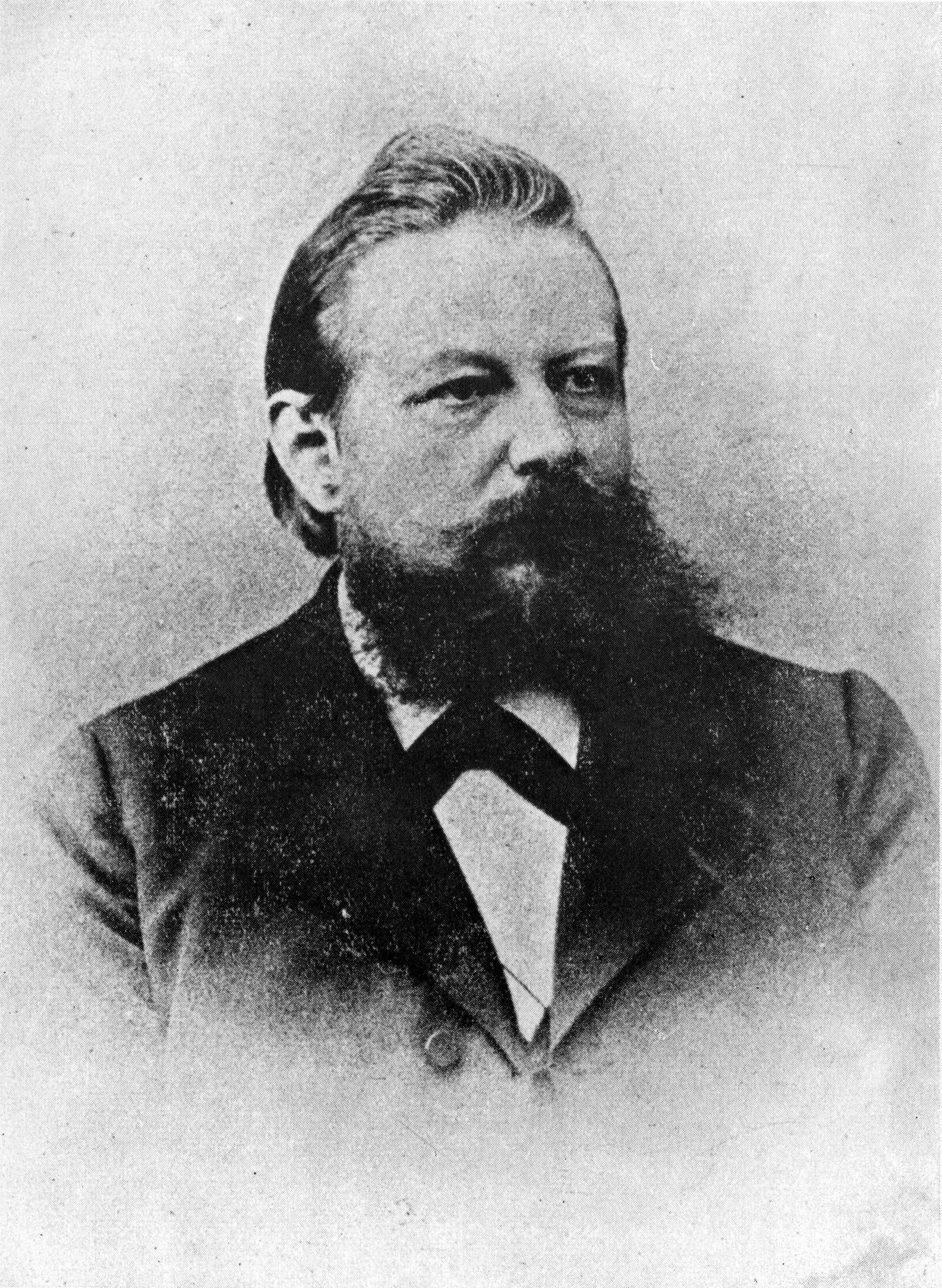
Wilhelm Windelband was a Southwest school Neo-Kantian.

The Southwest School (or Heidelberg School or Baden School) emphasized culture and value theory (notably the fact–value distinction), and included Lotze student Wilhelm Windelband (1848–1915), critical realist Alois Riehl (1844–1924), Heinrich Rickert (1863–1936), Ernst Troeltsch (1865–1923), and Emil Lask (1875–1915). Windelband influenced sociologist Max Weber (1864–1920), author of The Protestant Ethic and the Spirit of Capitalism (1905). Max's brother Alfred Weber (1868–1958) taught Karl Mannheim (1893–1947).

==== Neo-Friesian school ====
A third group, mainly represented by Leonard Nelson (1882–1927), was the Göttingen-based neo-Friesian School, which emphasized philosophy of science.

==== Psychologism dispute ====
The end of the 19th century saw the psychologism dispute. Psychologism was defended by Neo-Kantian Theodor Lipps (1851–1914), Dutch panpsychist Gerardus Heymans (1857–1930), psychologists Wilhelm Wundt (1832–1920), Theodor Elsenhans (1862–1918), and Benno Erdmann (1862–1918), pragmatist Wilhelm Jerusalem (1854–1923), and logician Christoph von Sigwart (1830–1904). Wundt taught Felix Krueger (1874–1948) and Oswald Külpe (1862–1915). Natorp and Riehl opposed psychologism.

=== Nietzsche ===
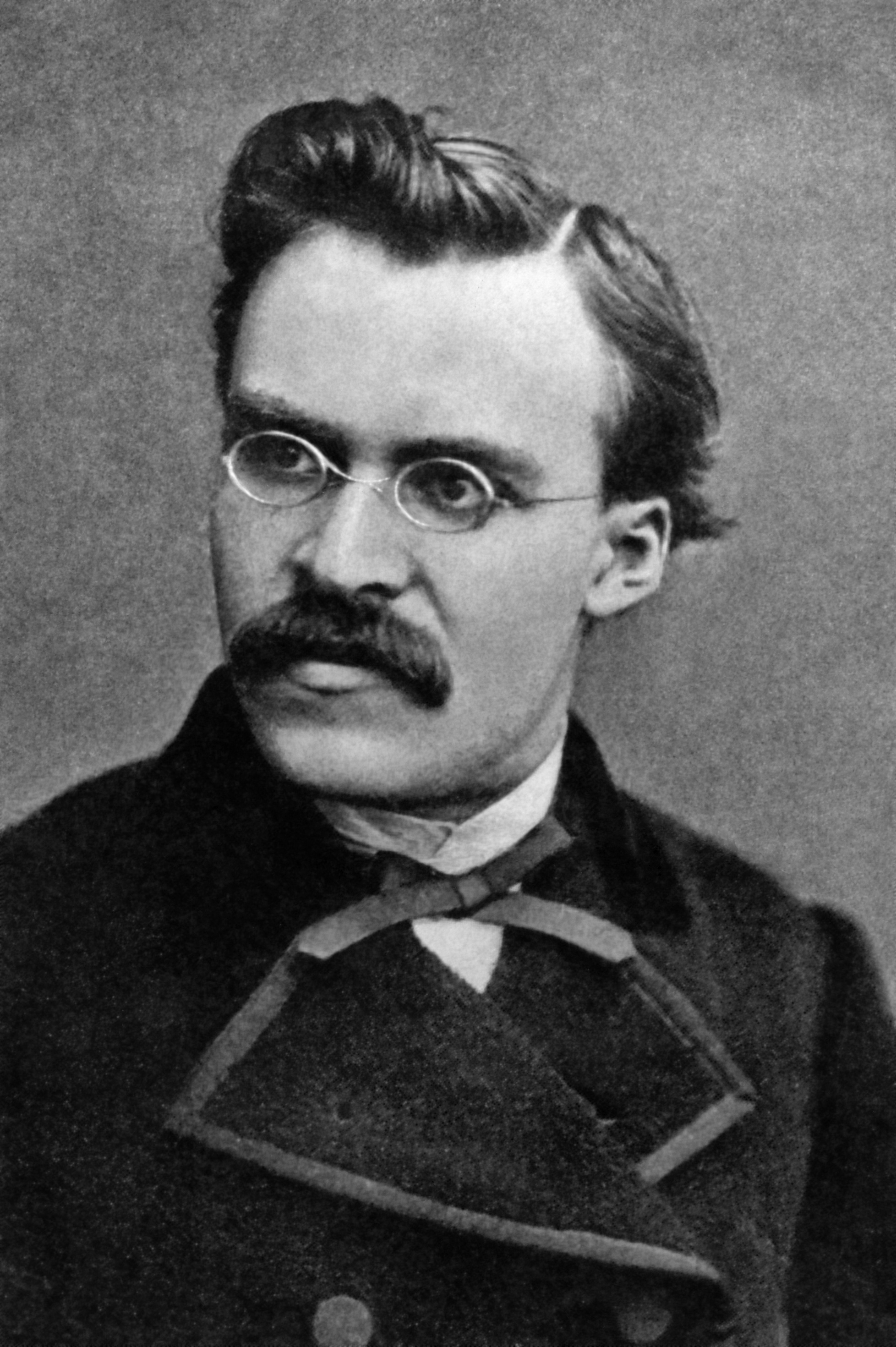
Friedrich Nietzsche backed the will to power

Friedrich Nietzsche (1844–1900) was an influential existentialist philosopher and philologist, and initially a proponent of Schopenhauer. Nietzsche was also an irrationalist and perspectivist influenced by Romanticism and Teichmuller. (Note: In the opinion of Marxist György Lukács, Nietzsche founded a modern irrationalism antithetical to that of the Romantics.)

Nietzsche soon replaced Schopenhauer's will to life with the will to power. He disavowed Schopenhauer's pessimism, and sought to provide a life-affirming, positive philosophy in works like Thus Spoke Zarathustra (1885) and The Gay Science (1882), a title from Friedrich Schlegel's novel Lucinde (1799). Nietzsche believed this task was urgent, since modernity and Christianity caused nihilism to spread across Europe, summed up in the phrase "God is dead". Nietzsche's proposed solution was the Übermensch and Eternal Recurrence.

Nietzsche next wrote the aphoristic Beyond Good and Evil (1886). In On the Genealogy of Morals (1887), Nietzsche gives a genealogical critique of Christian morality and related theory of master–slave morality. He continues the polemic against Christianity in The Antichrist (1895).

=== Dilthey ===
Trendelenburg student Wilhelm Dilthey (1833–1911) along with Nietzsche, Georg Simmel (1858–1918), and Ludwig Klages (1872–1956), founded the intuitionist and irrationalist school of German Lebensphilosophie.

Dilthey continued Schleiermacher's project of a hermeneutics which was a "general methodology of the humanities and social sciences". Dilthey was a historist who initiated a Romantic renaissance with his Schleiermacher biography and works on Novalis and Hölderlin. His vitalistic interpretations of Hegel and Goethe were influential; the latter led from Simmel and Friedrich Gundolf (1880–1931) to Klages, who coined the term logocentrism. Dilthey and Simmel influenced Austrian-Israeli existentialist Martin Buber (1878–1965), author of I and Thou (1923). Dilthey also influenced Hermann von Keyserling (1880–1946).

=== Mach ===
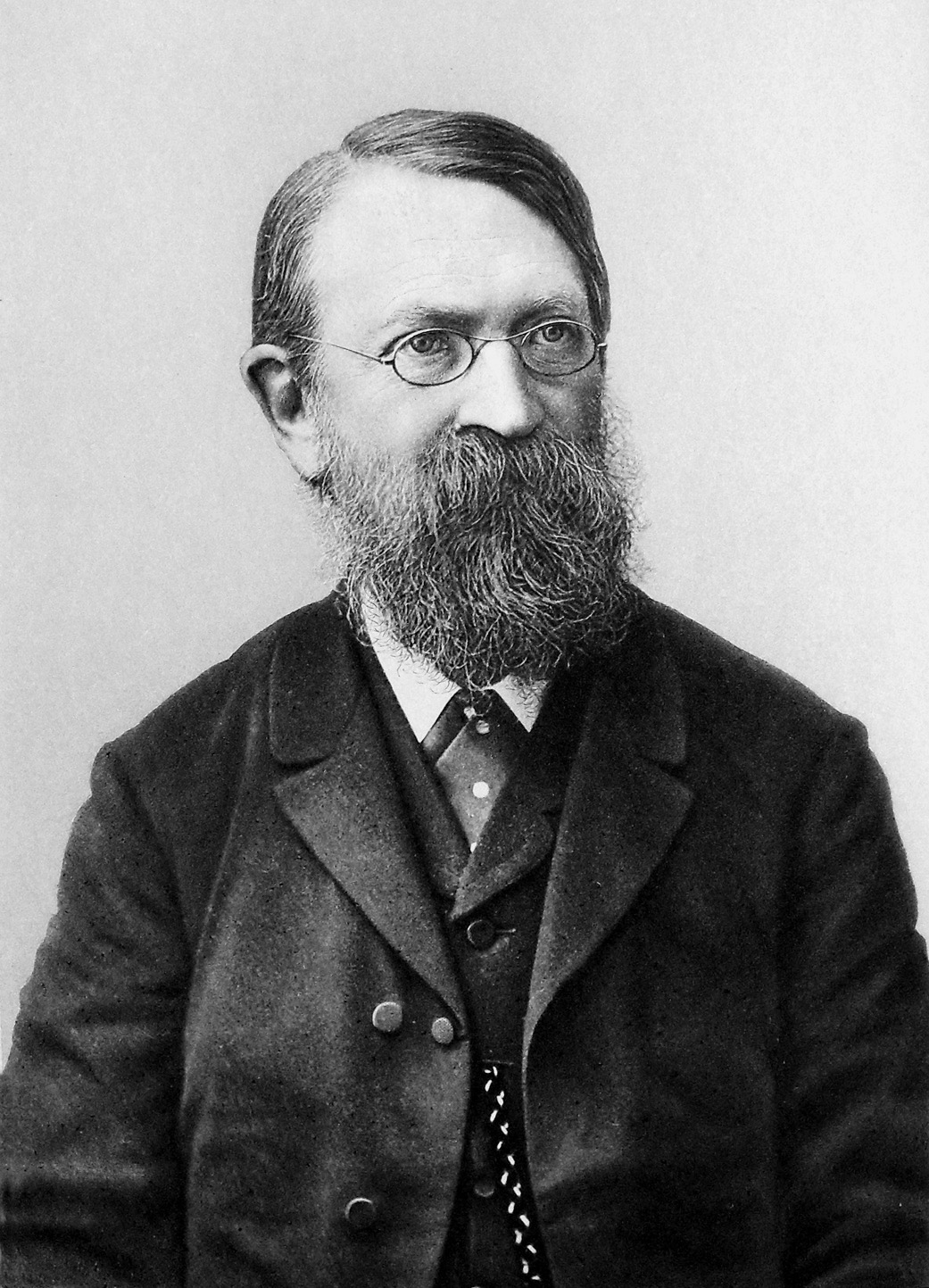
Ernst Mach believed in the "economy of thought"

Austrian physicist Ernst Mach (1838–1916) in works such as Analysis of Sensations (1885) and Cognition and Delusion (1905) propounded neutral monism, affirming everything was physical, yet equally considering everything to be “complexes of sensations,” rejecting an external world independent of consciousness.

Mach and teacher Gustav Kirchhoff (1824–1887) believed in the "economy of thought," to eliminate all superfluous metaphysical elements. Following Leibniz, Mach was a relationist about space. Mach's rival was Ludwig Boltzmann (1844–1906), notable for the Boltzmann brain thought experiment.

Fritz Mauthner (1849–1923) was Mach's student. Mach's views were widespread among physicists, including theory of relativity pioneer Albert Einstein, electromagnetism pioneer Heinrich Hertz (1857–1894), and Philipp Frank (1884–1966).

Mach's views also found support among Marxists such as Friedrich Adler (1879–1960) and Otto Bauer (1881–1938), and in Russia among a part of the Bolshevik intelligentsia. (Note: e. g. Alexander Bogdanov, Vladimir Bazarov, Anatoly Lunacharsky, Pavel Yushkevich, Nikolai Valentinov et al.)

Richard Avenarius (1843–1896) founded empirio-criticism. Avenarius similarly denied a world independent of consciousness. According to Avenarius, consciousness and being, subject and object ("I" and "environment") are in constant, obligatory connection ("fundamental coordination"). Joseph Petzoldt (1862–1929) was a disciple.

Communist revolutionary Vladimir Lenin (1870–1924) dedicated his entire book Materialism and Empirio-Criticism (1909) to the criticism of Mach, Frank, and Avenarius, writing "this philosophy serves the clergy, serves the same purposes as the philosophy of Berkeley and Hume."

=== Austrian realism ===
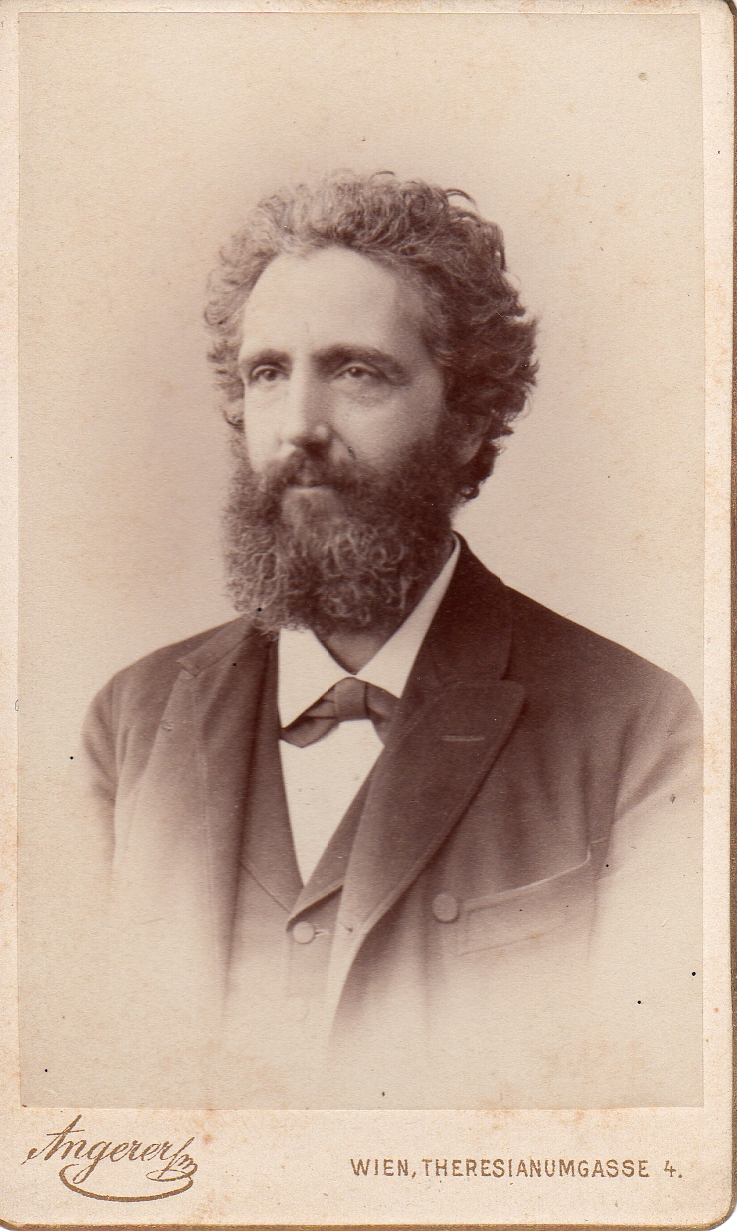
Franz Brentano re-introduced intentionality.

A school of thought called Austrian realism formed in the former state of Austria-Hungary, notable for influencing both analytic and continental philosophy. (Note: Michael Dummett has remarked analytic philosophy is better characterized as Anglo-Austrian rather than the usual Anglo-American.)

In Psychology from an Empirical Standpoint (1874), Trendelenburg student and University of Vienna philosopher and psychologist Franz Brentano (1838–1917) re-introduced the scholastic concept of intentionality, or aboutness. For Brentano, all mental events or acts of consciousness have a real, non-mental intentional object, which the thinking is directed at or "about". Intentionality is "the mark of the mental." Intentionality is to be distinguished from intention or intension.

The School of Brentano included Edmund Husserl (1859–1938) and Alexius Meinong (1853–1920). Meinong defends his unique ontology of empty names referring to real, nonexistent objects. This view is known as Meinongianism, or pejoratively as Meinong's jungle. According to Meinong, objects like flying pigs or golden mountains have real being, even though they do not exist. Meinong founded the Graz School, which included Ernst Mally (1879–1944).

Meinong's student Christian von Ehrenfels (1859–1932) is a founder of Gestalt psychology, also influenced by Goethe and Mach. Carl Stumpf (1848–1936), a student of Brentano and Lotze, founded the Berlin School of experimental psychology, which included Max Wertheimer, Wolfgang Köhler, and Kurt Koffka.

Brentano also influenced the Polish Lwów–Warsaw school, founded by Kazimierz Twardowski (1866–1938), who emphasized "small philosophy", or the detailed, systematic analysis of specific problems. Husserl, Meinong, and Twardowski were influenced by Bohemian Catholic and logical realist Bernard Bolzano (1781–1848). Bolzano foreshadowed analytic philosophy with talk of propositions, but in Kantian language, "sentences-in-themselves". (Note: Dummett remarked that Bolzano is analytic philosophy's great-grandfather.)

== 20th century ==
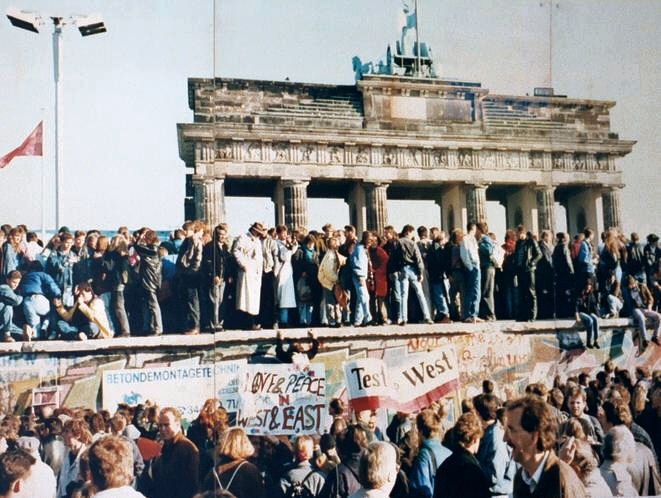
Shortly before its fall, Germans stand atop the Berlin Wall, in front of the Brandenburg Gate.

Germans influenced both major schools of 20th-century philosophy: the analytic and continental traditions. Ludwig Wittgenstein (1889–1951) and phenomenologist Martin Heidegger (1889–1976) are considered two of the century's most influential philosophers. (Note: For example, according to a poll by the Philosophical Gourmet Report.) So is phenomenologist Edmund Husserl; and "father of analytic philosophy" Gottlob Frege (1848–1925), who influenced Wittgenstein through his mentor, Briton Bertrand Russell. (Note: Russell wrote a book on Leibniz, which was reviewed by Cassirer.)

The 20th century also saw Imperial Germany's defeat in World War I (1914–1918) started by the assassination of Archduke Franz Ferdinand. Academic socialist Johann Plenge (1874–1963) wrote that World War I contrasted German socialism and organization against liberty and freedom.

Next was the Weimar Republic (1918–1933), Hitler's rise to power and the defeat of Nazi Germany (1933–1945) in World War II (1939–1945), and the subsequent Cold War (1947–1991) dividing Germany into East and West, until the Fall of the Berlin Wall (November 9, 1989) and German reunification (October 3, 1990).

=== Neo-Romanticism ===
Adam Müller influenced Austrian neo-romantic universalist Othmar Spann (1878–1950), who taught Friedrich Hayek (1899–1992), critic of scientism and winner of the 1974 Nobel Prize in economics.

=== Neo-Hegelianism ===
Neo-Hegelianism (or Post-Hegelianism) was a trend including Richard Kroner, Siegfried Marck, Arthur Liebert, and Hermann Glöckner. Richard Kroner (1884–1974) was a Jewish convert to Christianity who dubbed Hegel "the Protestant Aquinas".

=== Spengler ===
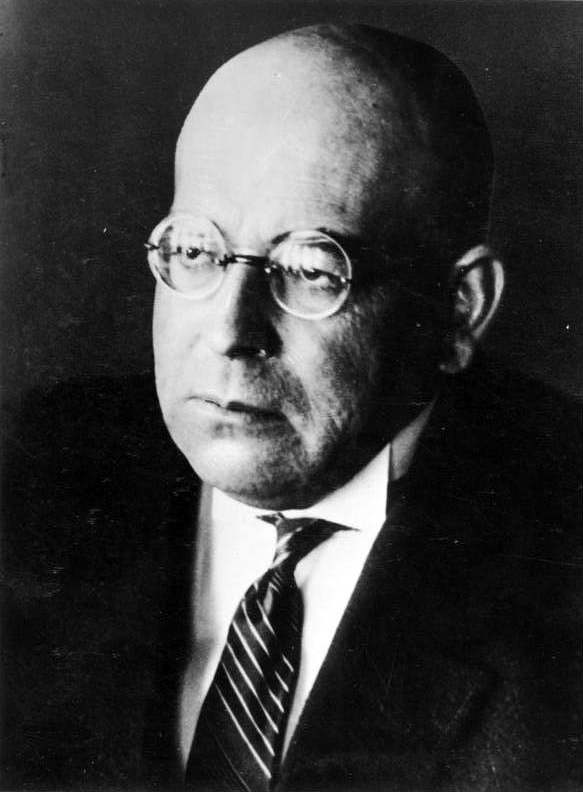
Oswald Spengler, the philosopher of decline.

German philosopher of history Oswald Spengler (1880–1936) was influenced by Goethe, Nietzsche, and Neo-Kantian scientific fictionalist Hans Vaihinger (1852–1933), author of The Philosophy of 'As if' (1911). Spengler's main work is The Decline of the West (1918), published shortly after World War I. Spengler predicts the inevitable collapse of European civilization. In Man and Technics (1931), Spengler said "Optimism is cowardice."

Spengler’s philosophy of history is based on analogy and denies causation, knowledge, and truth, preferring intuition and absolute relativism. Spengler contrasts the scientific understanding of natural historical development with historical fatalism or “destiny.”

Spengler rejects historical progress and linear, unified whig history. adopting a cyclical, organic theory of history. Independent, unique “cultures,” special organisms, guided by a unique idea and destiny, experience periods of early age emergence, middle age flourishing and old age dying. According to Spengler, the philosopher of history comprehends the “morphological structure” of the "soul" of each “culture". He calls Western European culture Faustian, ruled by the idea of infinity, and says its decline started in the 19th century, with the victory of capitalism. Spengler influenced Englishman Arnold Toynbee (1889–1975).

Spengler was an elitist who praised the era of feudalism and the “Old Prussian spirit” of monarchy, nobility and militarism, stating war is “an eternal form of higher human existence.” He disliked democracy, declaring "the mass", the “fourth estate”, (Note: To be distinguished from the usual usage of "fourth estate" to mean the press and news media.) “outside" of history and culture, a “radical nothing.” Historicist Friedrich Meinecke (1862–1954) criticized Spengler.

=== Spartacists ===
As World War I ended, Marxist Spartacus League and Communist Party of Germany (KPD) leaders such as Rosa Luxemburg (1871–1919) and Karl Liebknecht (1871–1919) sparked the November Revolution, including the Spartacist uprising and abdication of Kaiser Wilhelm II. The Freikorps defeated the revolutionaries.

=== Pan-Europeanism ===
Austro-Japanese Richard von Coudenhove-Kalergi (1894–1972) supported American president Woodrow Wilson's Fourteen Points following World War I, and was one of the first to articulate Pan-Europeanism, outlined in his Pan-Europa manifesto (1923). The First Paneuropean Congress took place in Vienna in 1926.

=== Nazi philosophy ===
Adolf Hitler came to power in 1933 and led Nazi Germany, with its combination of anti-semitism, nationalism and socialism, arguably influenced by Spengler, who in Prussianism and Socialism (1919) advances “German socialism” against “Marxist socialism”. The Nazi Party or National Socialist German Worker's Party was an outgrowth of the German Worker's Party founded shortly after World War I by Pan-German folkist Anton Drexler, poet Dietrich Eckart, economist Gottfried Feder, and Karl Harrer.

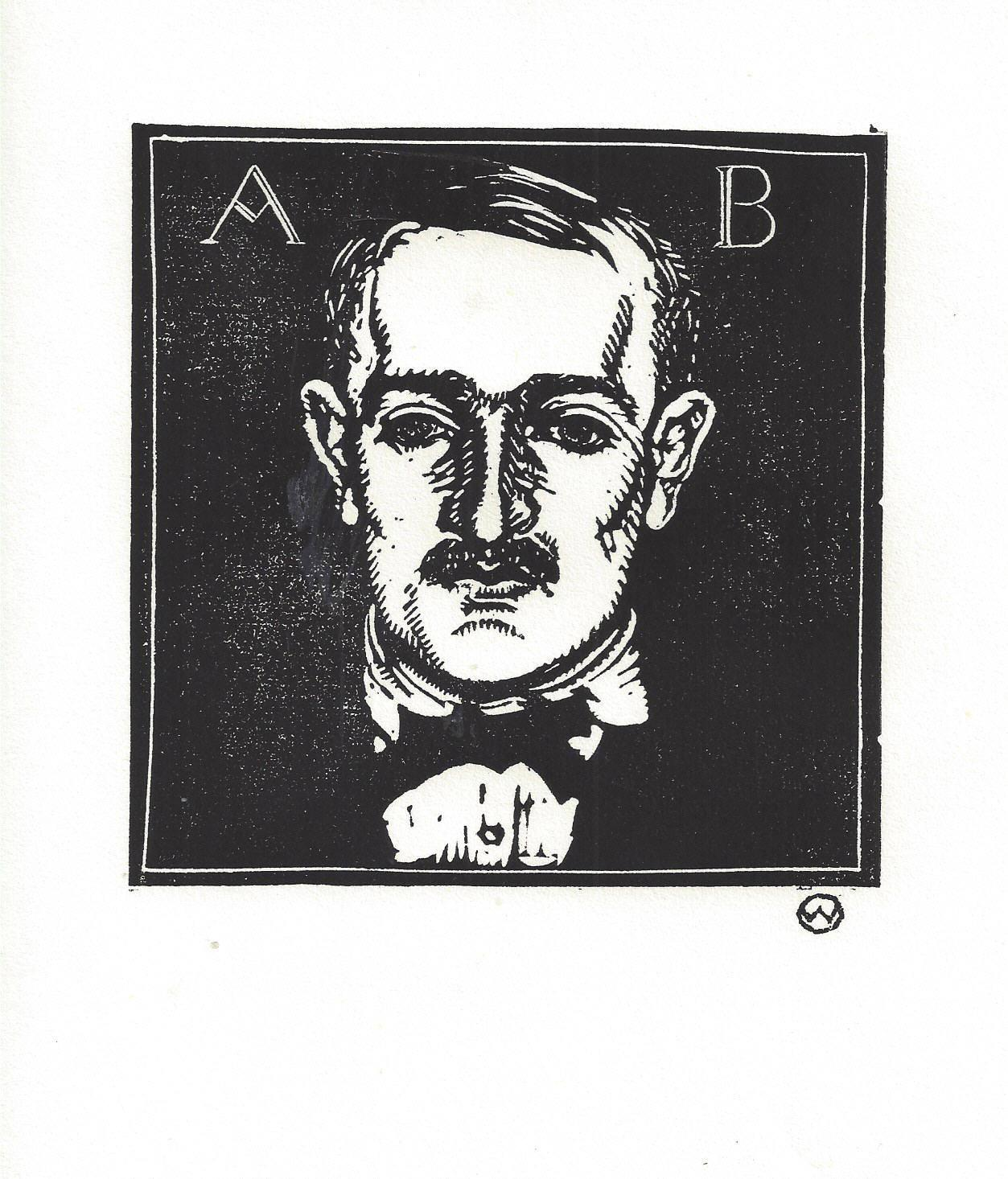
Alfred Baeumler, best known academic philosopher in Nazi Germany.

The Nazis propounded the Stab-in-the-back myth and opposed 'the system' of the Weimar Republic, denouncing the November Revolution and German leaders who signed the Treaty of Versailles and Armistice of November 11, 1918 as "November criminals".

The Nazi Party included philosophers Heidegger, who took the vow of allegiance, and Carl Schmitt (1888–1985), author of The Concept of the Political (1932). Ernst Mally joined the National Socialist Teachers League soon after the Anschluss (1938). Meinecke supported the invasion of Poland (1939).

The best known work of Nazi philosophy was The Myth of the Twentieth Century (1930) by head of the Militant League for German Culture Alfred Rosenberg (1893–1946). It said soul was race seen from within, and was awarded the State Prize for Art and Science for 1937. Its title was an homage to Houston Stewart Chamberlain's The Foundations of the Nineteenth Century (1899).

Nazi Germany's most prominent academic philosopher was Alfred Baeumler (1887–1968), director of the Institute for Political Pedagogy in Berlin, who advocated Nietzsche's philosophy. There was also anti-Kantian Ernst Krieck (1882–1947).

Positive Christianity was a religious movement in Nazi Germany claiming Christ was Aryan. The pagan German Faith Movement was founded by Tübingen Indologist Jakob Wilhelm Hauer (1881–1962) and influenced by occultist Guido von List (1848–1919), founder of Wotanism and author of The Secret of the Runes (1908).

By 1933, the various neo-Kantian circles in Germany had dispersed. The Nazis expelled both the analytic Vienna Circle and the continental Frankfurt School, entrenching them in American philosophy. Emil Fackenheim (1916–2003) was interned at Sachsenhausen concentration camp.

=== Analytic philosophy ===
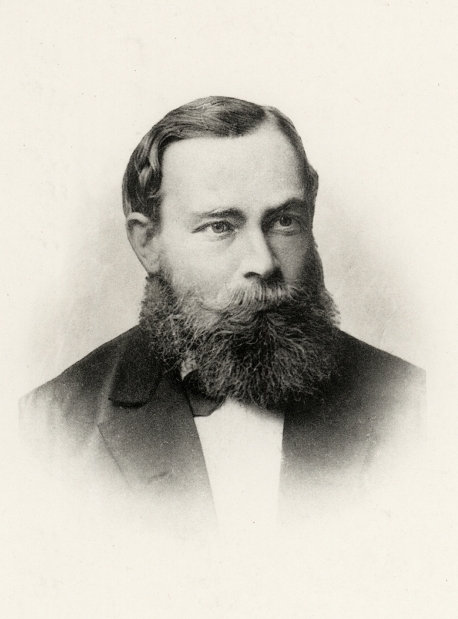
Gottlob Frege, founder of analytic philosophy.

==== Gottlob Frege ====
Advances in logic from Britain were imported by Ernst Schröder (1841–1902). The predicate logic of University of Jena professor Gottlob Frege found in Begriffschrift (1879) subsequently made the most substantial advance over Aristotelian logic. (Note: Kant incorrectly claimed in the Critique of Pure Reason that "Since Aristotle . . . logic has not been able to advance a single step, and is thus to all appearance a closed and completed doctrine.") Frege was also an influential opponent of idealism in the philosophy of language and philosophy of mathematics, beginning the "linguistic turn" and analytic philosophy, the dominant style in the Anglosphere. (Note: American philosopher John Searle called Frege the second greatest German philosopher, behind only Kant.)

Frege supported Leibniz and opposed Kant in the philosophy of mathematics. He advocated logicism, the project of reducing arithmetic to pure logic. In set theory Frege extended the work of German mathematicians Georg Cantor (1845–1918) and Richard Dedekind (1831–1916).

Frege was also influenced by Lotze. He argued for mathematical platonism and against psychologism in works like The Foundations of Arithmetic (1884). In the philosophy of language, Frege advocated a mediated reference theory in his paper On Sense and Reference (1892), and for platonism about propositions in the article Thought (1918).

==== Early Wittgenstein ====
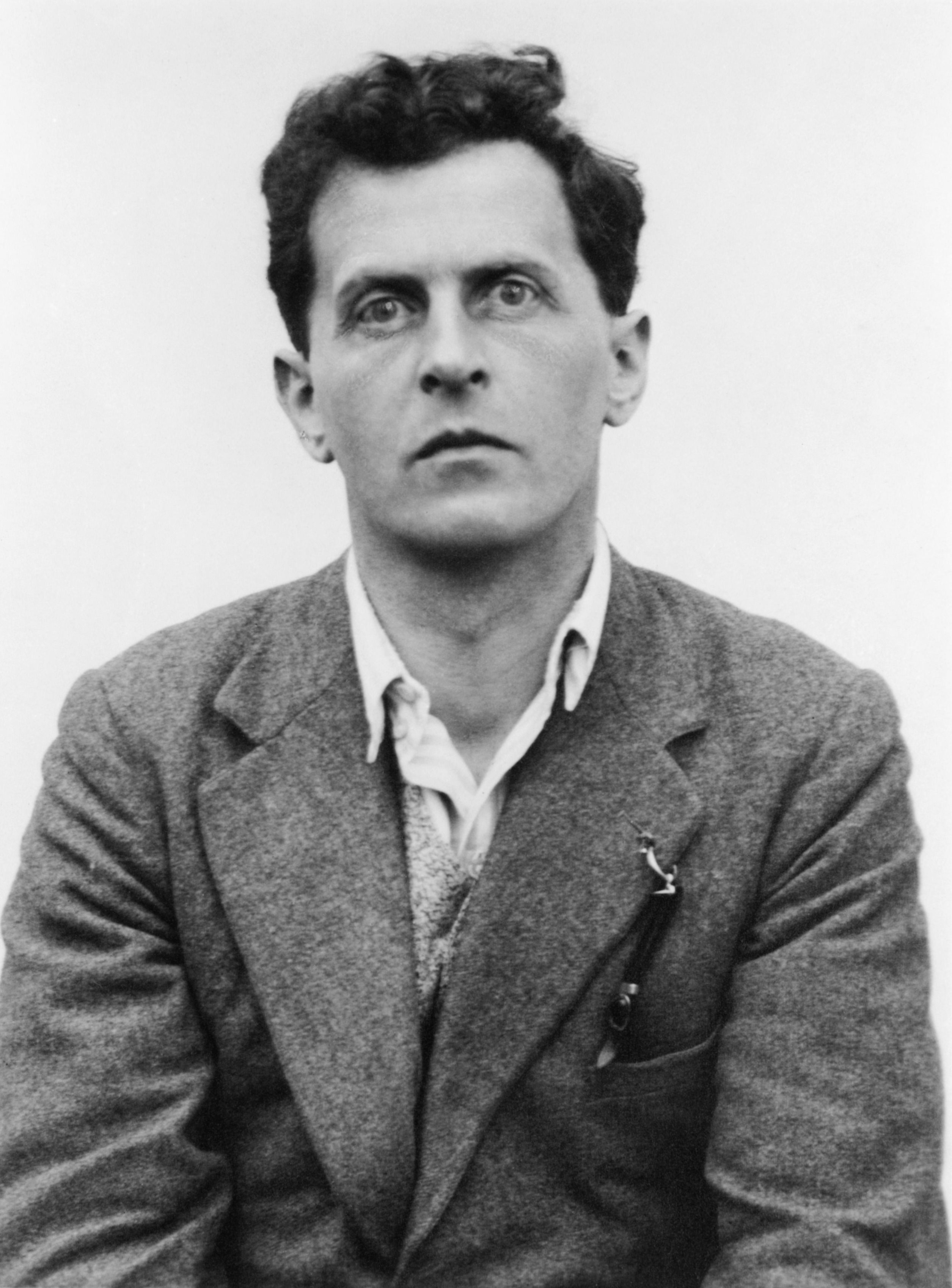
Ludwig Wittgenstein, author of the Tractatus

Ludwig Wittgenstein of the prominent Austrian-Jewish Wittgenstein family read solipsist and misogynist Otto Weininger (1880–1903) in his youth. (Note: Weininger committed suicide in the house where Beethoven had died.) After studying with Russell, Wittgenstein served for the Austro-Hungarian Army in World War I, simultaneously developing a comprehensive system of logical atomism and picture theory of meaning. When Wittgenstein published Tractatus Logico-Philosophicus (German: Logisch-Philosophische Abhandlung, 1921), he thought he solved all the problems of philosophy.

The Tractatus starts, "The world is all that is the case." Wittgenstein claims the universe is the totality of actual states of affairs, which can be expressed and mirrored by the language of predicate logic. Thus, a picture of the universe can be constructed by expressing facts in the form of atomic propositions and linking them using logical operators.

The Tractatus introduced philosophers to the terms tautology, truth conditions, and to the truth table method. Wittgenstein believed tautologies or logical truths say nothing, but show the logical structure of the world, and has been labeled a mystic who believed in the ineffable by some readers. The Tractatus further ultimately concludes that all of its propositions are meaningless, illustrated with a ladder one must toss away after climbing up it. The book ends, "Whereof one cannot speak, thereof one must be silent."

==== The Vienna Circle ====
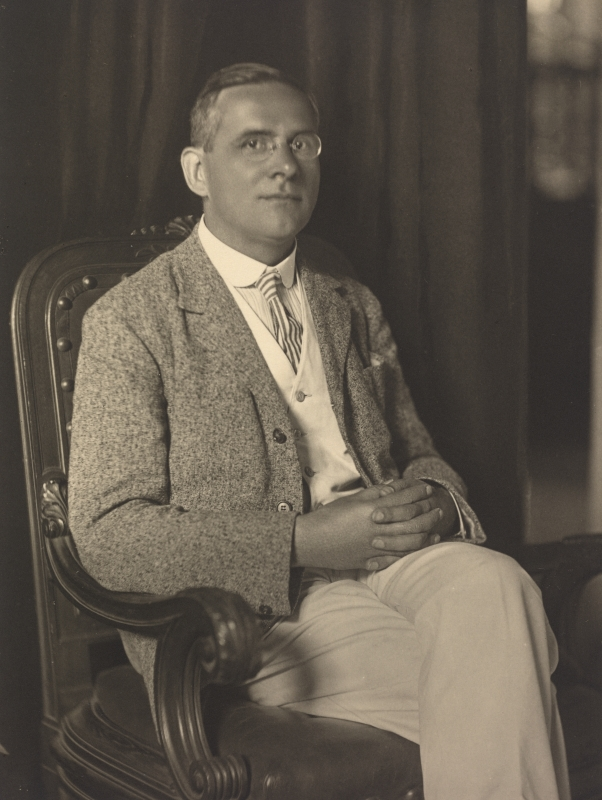
Moritz Schlick

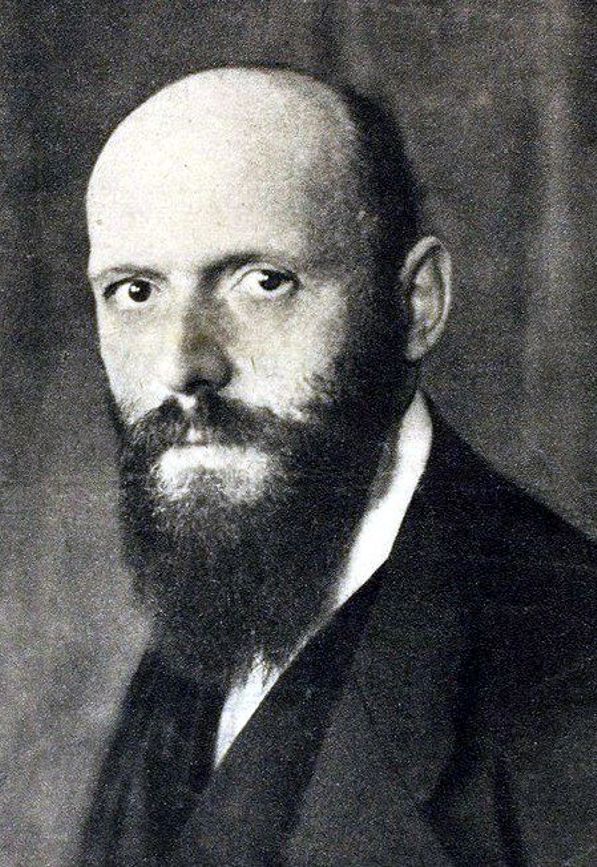
Otto Neurath

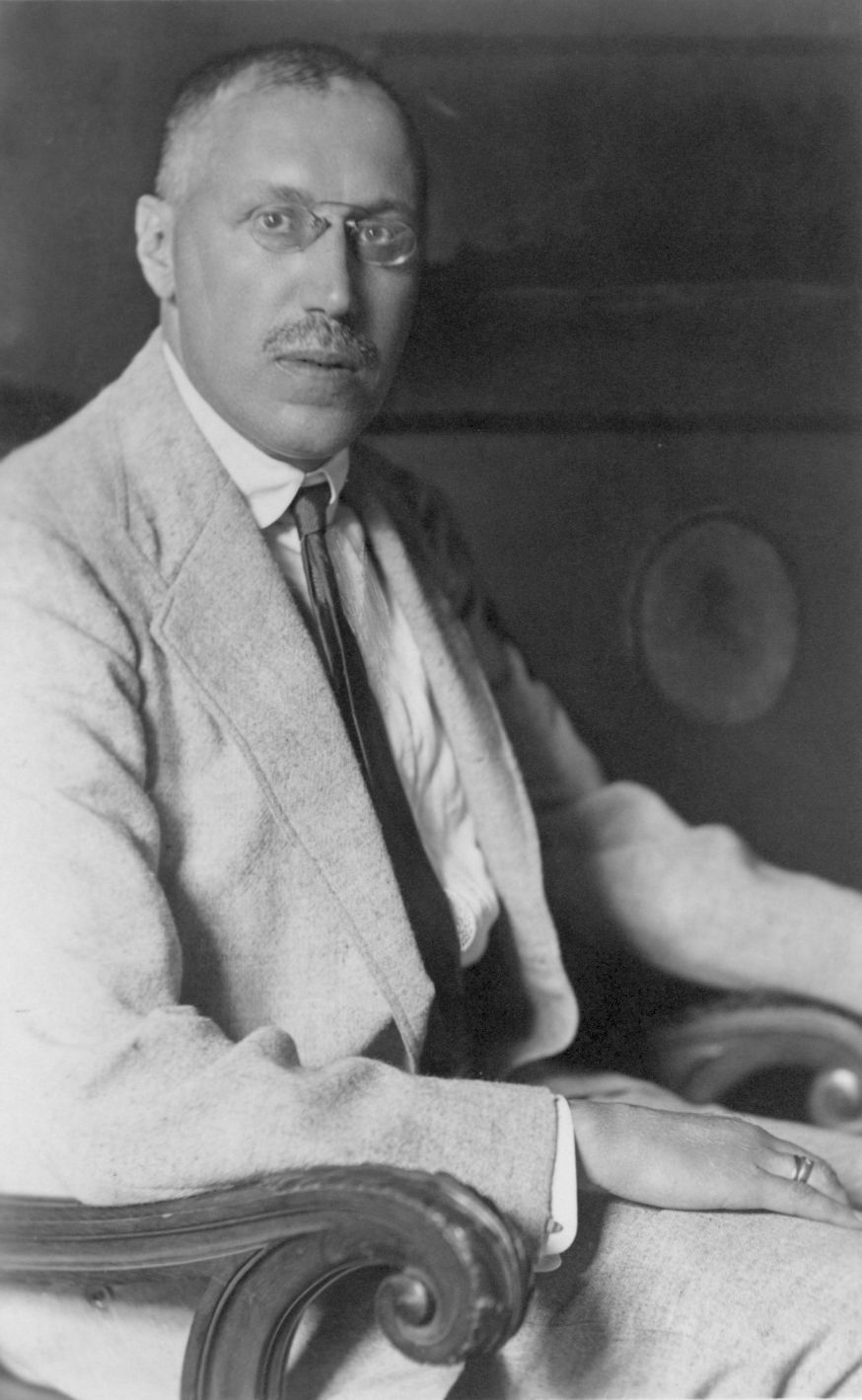
Hans Hahn

Rudolf Carnap

Members of the Vienna Circle

The Vienna Circle (originally the Ernst Mach society) formed to promote scientific thought and combat the influence of Hegelian system-building. Wittgenstein influenced their philosophy, called logical positivism, which believed every meaningful statement is either an analytic truth or a verifiable, synthetic truth. The Vienna Circle was led by Moritz Schlick, and included Rudolf Carnap (1891–1970), Philipp Frank, Hans Hahn (1879–1934), and Otto Neurath (1882–1945).

Neurath, notable for Neurath's boat, was also a socialist, incarcerated when the Bavarian Soviet Republic was defeated after the November Revolution, penning Anti-Spengler (1921) in prison.

The closely related Berlin Circle was led by Hans Reichenbach (1891–1953) and included Carl Hempel (1905–1997) and mathematician David Hilbert (1862–1943). (Note: There was also the Dutch significs group led by Frederik van Eeden, which included intuitionist LEJ Brouwer.) Hahn taught Kurt Gödel (1906–1978) whose incompleteness theorems (1931) showed Hilbert's program was impossible.

Carnap and Reichenbach started the journal Erkenntnis. Carnap advocated solving problems by "semantic ascent", talking about language instead of its objects. Carnap also distinguished between trivial internal questions and meaningless external questions. He is best known for works like The Logical Structure of the World (1967) and The Elimination of Metaphysics Through Logical Analysis of Language (1959).

Moritz Schlick 1882–1936) was murdered by his former student Johann Nelböck. Vienna Circle associate Karl Popper (1902–1994) was notable for falsification and The Open Society and Its Enemies (1945).

==== Later Wittgenstein ====
Wittgenstein then had a radical break with his early philosophy, as exemplified by the posthumously published Philosophical Investigations (1953).

The later Wittgenstein develops a therapeutic approach, introducing the concept of a "language-game" as a "form of life". By "language-game", one means a language simpler than an entire language. Wittgenstein argued that a word or sentence has meaning only as a result of the "rule" of the "game" being played. Depending on the context, for example, the utterance "Water!" could be an order, the answer to a question, or some other form of communication. Rather than his prior picture theory of meaning, the later Wittgenstein advocates a theory of meaning as use, according to which words are defined by how they are used within the language-game.

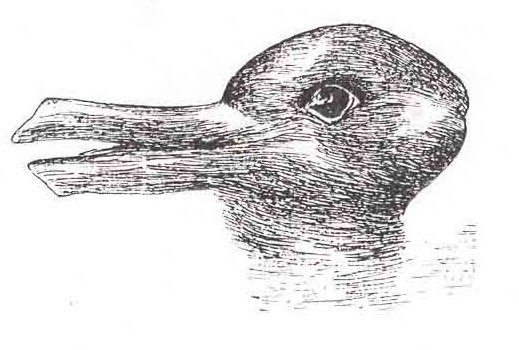
The duck-rabbit illusion became famous when Wittgenstein used it to distinguish "seeing that" from "seeing as".

The notion of family resemblance contends things apparently connected by one essential, common feature may in fact be connected by a series of overlapping similarities, where no one feature is common to all of them. Since Wittgenstein, games have been a classic example.

Philosophical Investigations also contains the private language argument. Another argument Wittgenstein makes against private language involves the beetle-in-a-box thought experiment. He asks the reader to imagine several people have a box, inside of which is something everyone intends to refer to with the word beetle. Further, suppose that no one can look inside another's box. Under such a situation, Wittgenstein says the word beetle is meaningless.

He also uses the duck-rabbit, an ambiguous image, to describe two aspects of seeing: "seeing that" versus "seeing as". Wittgenstein listed his influences as "Boltzmann, Hertz, Schopenhauer, Frege, Russell, Kraus, Loos, Weininger, Spengler, and Sraffa."

=== Continental philosophy ===
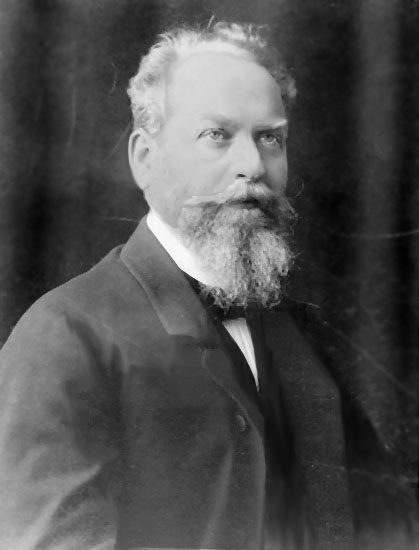
Edmund Husserl

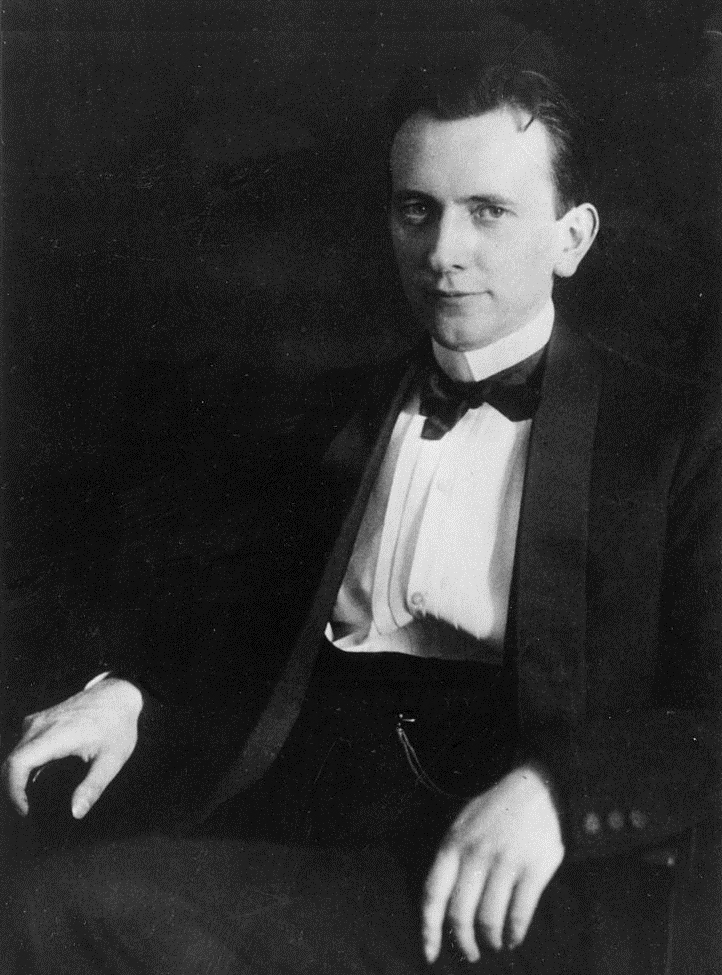
Karl Jaspers

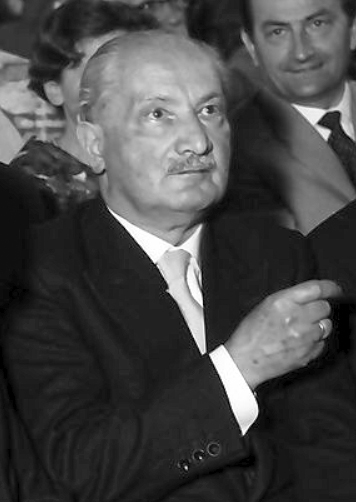
Martin Heidegger

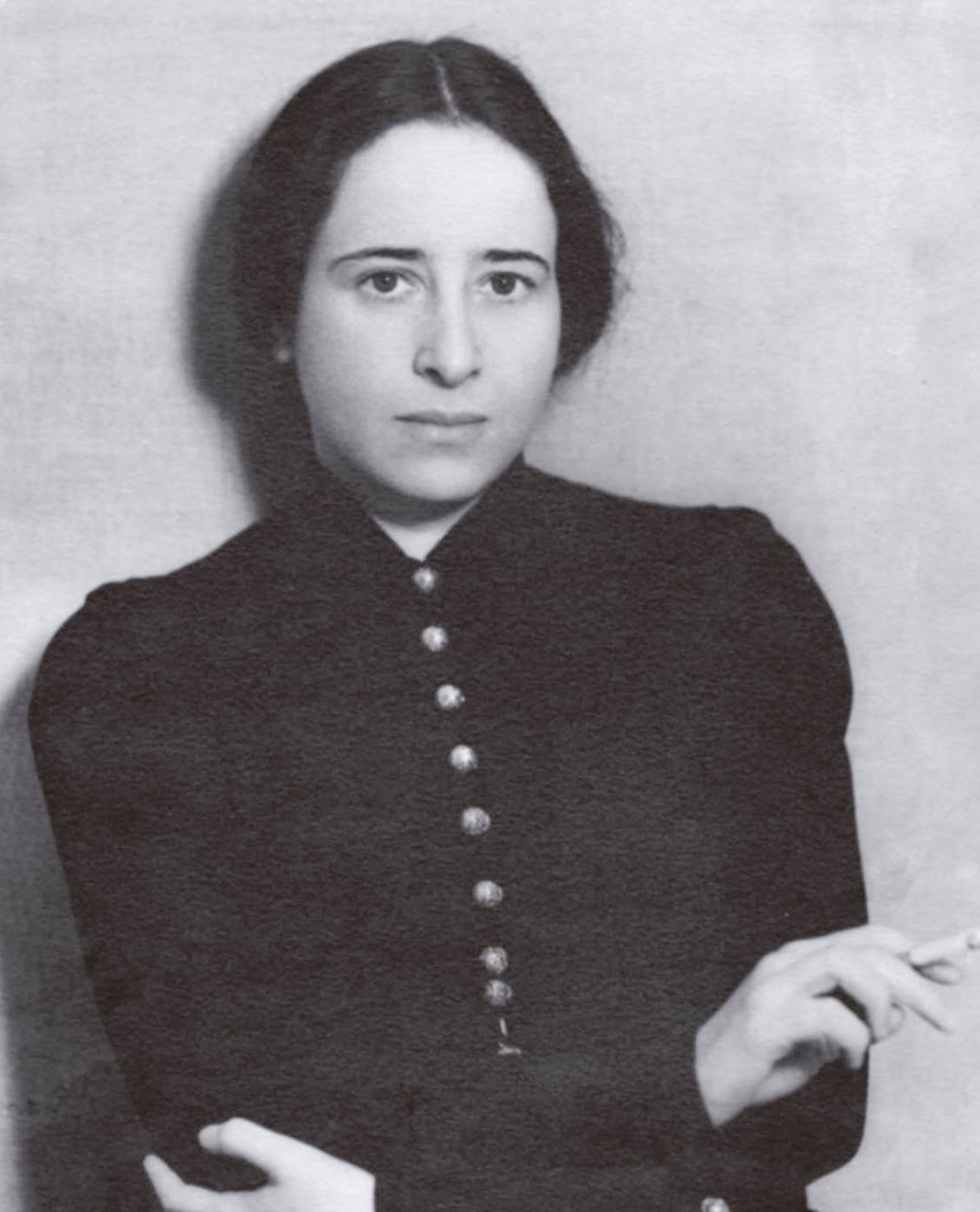
Hannah Arendt

Continental philosophers

While some of the seminal philosophers of analytic philosophy wrote in German, 20th-century German philosophy tends to be classified as 'continental' philosophy – as befits Germany's position on the European 'continent' as opposed to the British Isles or Anglosphere.

Existentialism influenced continental philosophy. Heidegger is often identified as an existentialist, though he rejected this. Karl Jaspers (1883–1969) also rejected the label, despite being a student of Kierkegaard and Nietzsche. Jaspers' early philosophy believed in the authentic self or existenz, found in Philosophy of Existence (1938). Heidegger and Jaspers student Hannah Arendt (1906–1975) was an influential political theorist.

==== Phenomenology ====
Phenomenology is philosophy which emphasizes phenomena as it is given to consciousness, attempting to avoid imposed explanations. It began with the transcendental phenomenology of Edmund Husserl, and has had a large influence on continental philosophy, particularly existentialism and poststructuralism.

===== Edmund Husserl =====
Influenced by Brentano and Stumpf, Husserl taught at the University of Göttingen. Frege responded to Husserl's psychologism from Philosophy of Arithmetic (1891), and Husserl subsequently changed his mind, refuting psychologism in Logical Investigations (1901). For Husserl, every mental act has noema or meaningful content.

Husserl's other best known work is the Cartesian Meditations (1931). Husserl believes phenomenology seeks the eidos or essence, with redness as his preferred example. Husserl advocates bracketing to focus on experience and achieve eidetic variation and reduction. Husserl introduced the concept of the lifeworld in The Crisis of European Sciences and Transcendental Phenomenology (1936).

Husserl influenced students of Lipps, such as World War I casualty Adolf Reinach (1883–1917), founder of Munich phenomenology, which included Max Scheler (1874–1928). He also influenced Alsatian Jean Héring (1890–1966), Polish aesthete Roman Ingarden (1893–1970), and philosophers of science like operationalist Hugo Dingler (1881–1954).

===== Martin Heidegger =====
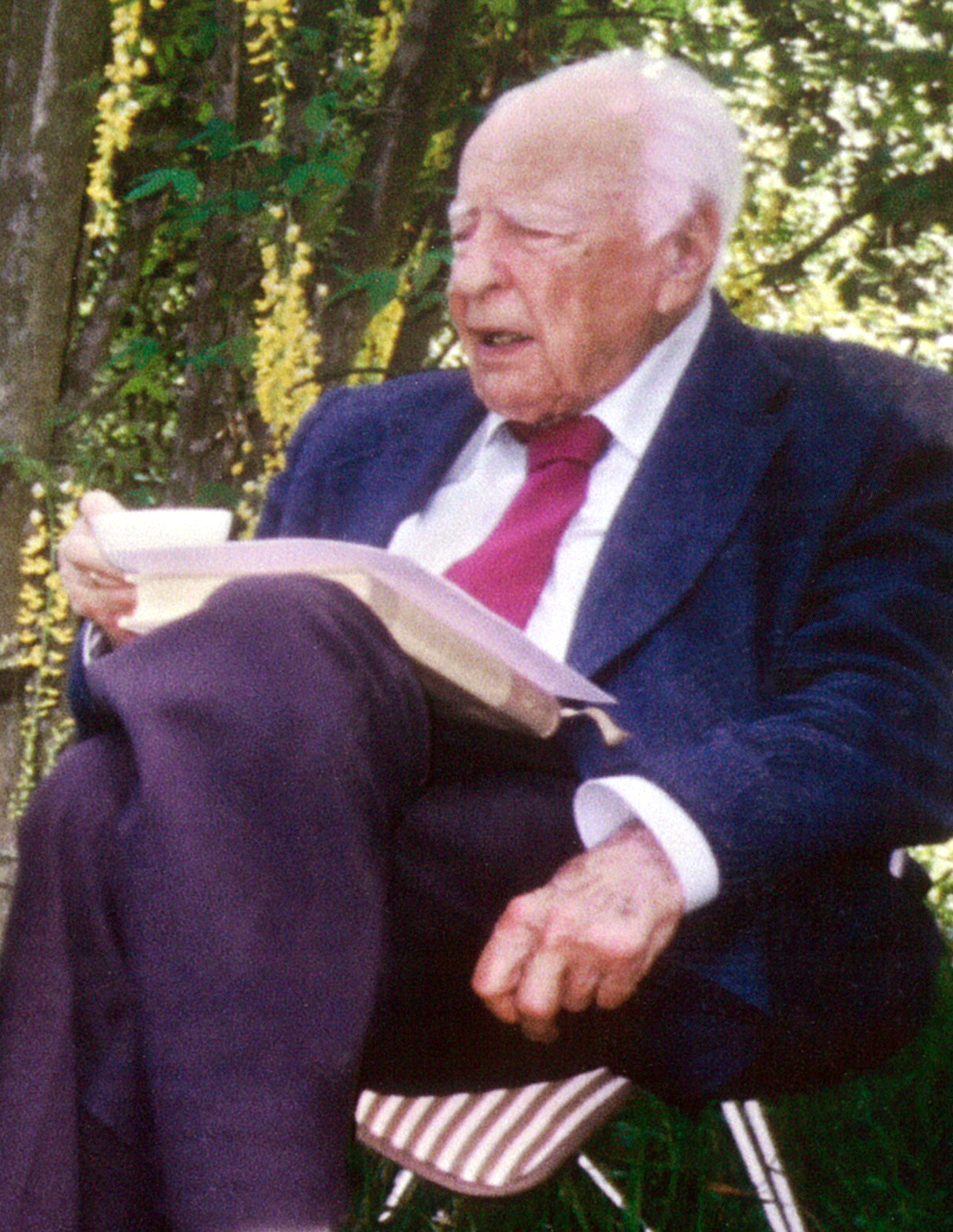
Hans-Georg Gadamer developed hermeneutics.

Martin Heidegger's magnum opus Being and Time (1927) applied phenomenology to ontology and discussed the metaphysics of presence. Heidegger is notable for such concepts as "care" and Dasein, the consciousness particular to people of "being there", and the "facticity" of "thrownness", being thrown into the world. He argued aletheia (usually translated as "truth") is better understood as disclosure.

Heidegger gave up "philosophy" in his later life, preferring the term "thinking". In works like Introduction to Metaphysics (1953), Heidegger believed "the thinking of Heraclitus and Parmenides, which lies at the origin of philosophy, was falsified and misinterpreted" by Plato and Aristotle, tainting all subsequent Western philosophy. His later philosophy was much concerned with technology, in works like The Question Concerning Technology (1954).

With Martin Heidegger's Being and Time, hermeneutics took an 'ontological turn', dealing with the most fundamental questions of being. Heidegger developed the concept of a hermeneutic circle in The Origin of the Work of Art (1950), further developed by his pupil Hans-Georg Gadamer (1900–2002), author of Truth and Method (1960).

==== Frankfurt School ====
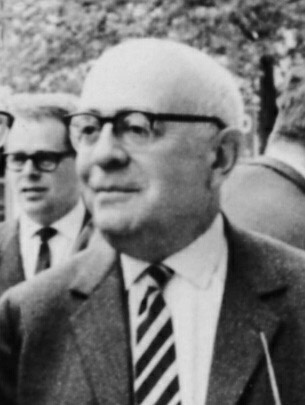
Theodor Adorno

In 1923, Carl Grünberg founded the Institute for Social Research, drawing from neo-Hegelianism, anti-Stalinist Marxism, Freud's psychoanalysis, and Max Weber, which came to be known as the "Frankfurt School", founders of critical theory and associated with writers such as Theodor W. Adorno (1903–1969), Arendt colleague Walter Benjamin (1892–1940), Ernst Bloch (1885–1977), Erich Fromm (1900–1980), Max Horkheimer (1895–1973), Herbert Marcuse (1898–1979), and Wilhelm Reich (1897–1957).

The school reorganized in Frankfurt after World War II, critiquing the alleged problems of the Enlightenment and modernity in Dialectic of Enlightenment (1947) by Adorno and Horkheimer and Negative Dialectics (1966) by Adorno.

In the 1960s and 1970s, Marcuse became the pre-eminent theorist of the New Left. The Frankfurt School has since been guided by Jürgen Habermas' (1929–2026) work on communicative reason and linguistic intersubjectivity. Habermas once debated philosopher of social science Niklas Luhmann (1927–1998).

== See also ==
- History of philosophy
- List of Austrian intellectual traditions
- List of German-language philosophers
- Dutch philosophy

== Sources ==
- Ayer, A. J., ed. (1959). "Editor's introduction". Logical Positivism. Free Press. pp. 3–30.
- Będkowski, Marcin, ed. (2020). Formal and Informal Methods in Philosophy. BRILL. ISBN 978-90-04-42050-2.
- Brentano, Franz (1973) [1874]. Psychology from An Empirical Standpoint. London: Routledge. ISBN 9780710074256.
- Dummett, Michael (1993). The Origins of Analytical Philosophy. Cambridge, MA: Harvard University Press. ISBN 978-0-674-64473-1.
- Korab-Karpowicz, W. Julian (2016). The Presocratics in the Thought of Martin Heidegger. Peter Lang. ISBN 978-3631712917.
- Monk, Ray (1990). Ludwig Wittgenstein: The Duty of Genius. Free Press.
- Oberman, H. A. (1967). The Harvest of Medieval Theology: Gabriel Biel and Late Medieval Nominalism. Baker.
- Ramsey, Frank P. (1923). "Critical notices". Mind. 32 (128): 465–478. doi:10.1093/mind/XXXII.128.465.
- Rose, Mary Carman (1983). "Foreword to the ROSE Edition". Something About Kierkegaard. By Swenson, David F. Swenson, Lillian Marvin (ed.). (ROSE ed.). Macon, GA: Mercer University Press. pp. xiii–xxiv. ISBN 978-0-86554-084-2 – via the Internet Archive.
- Vogt, Carl (1874). Physiologische Briefe (in German) (14 ed.). Gießen: Rickersche Buchhandlung.
- Wittgenstein, Ludwig (1922). Tractatus Logico-Philosophicus.
