= La Luz de Jesus =

Art gallery in Los Angeles, California

Coordinates: 34.1004°N 118.2899°W

La Luz de Jesus Gallery is a commercial art gallery founded in 1986 and located in Los Angeles, California. It is closely associated with the Lowbrow art movement, Kustom Kulture, and pop surrealism. It is located in Soap Plant / Wacko in Los Feliz.

== History ==
La Luz de Jesus Gallery was established in 1986, in Los Angeles, California by entrepreneur and art collector Billy Shire. The original gallery was located in a bright pink building on Melrose Avenue, upstairs from Shire's retail store Soap Plant / Wacko. As Melrose Avenue became increasingly gentrified, the gallery was relocated to the Los Feliz district on Hollywood Boulevard near Vermont Avenue. The early years of La Luz de Jesus gallery, before its relocation to Hollywood Boulevard, coincide with the Golden Age of Lowbrow.

In April 2005, Shire opened a sister gallery, Billy Shire Fine Arts, in Culver City, California, which closed in 2010.

== Mission and influence ==
La Luz de Jesus Gallery provides both an exhibition space and a support structure to Lowbrow and pop surrealist artists. The gallery's mission is to make underground artists and counterculture accessible to the general public. The gallery shows primarily figurative and narrative painting and unusual sculpture, with a focus on themes and styles including folk art, outsider art, religious art, taxidermy art, and alternative erotica. The gallery presents a new exhibit each month with an opening reception on the first Friday of every month.

The gallery has been the first to introduce to the public many then-unknown artists who have gone on to claim their place in the art world. These artists include Manuel Ocampo, Joe Coleman, Shag, and Robert Williams. Other notable artists that have exhibited at the gallery include Marco Almera, Joel Hernandez, and Joe Sorren.

In addition to regular solo and two-person shows, the gallery also hosts a variety of group shows, including a much-anticipated annual group exhibition entitled "Everything But the Kitschen Sync" which introduces relatively unknown and emerging artists at the beginning of their careers.
