= Gottfried Ploucquet =

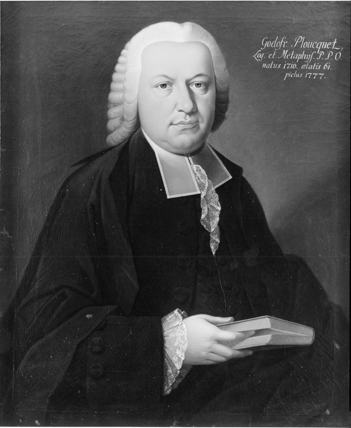
- Born: 1716
- Died: 1790 (aged 73–74)

Gottfried Ploucquet (1716–1790) was a German philosopher and logician. Ploucquet taught at the University of Tübingen. A student of Christian Wolff, Ploucquet was influenced by Leibniz's ideas of a universal language (characterista universalis) and a logical calculus (calculus ratiocenator). August Friedrich Bök was a student of Ploucquet. His logic influenced Johann Heinrich Lambert.

== Biography ==
Ploucquet was born in Stuttgart, the son of Gottfried Ploucquet, a Huguenot refugee who fled Lyon after the revocation of the Edict of Nantes (Edict of Fontainebleau, 1685). He became a professor at the University of Tübingen, as would his son, Wilhelm Gottfried Ploucquet. Other descendants of Ploucquet include Christoph Friedrich Ploucquet, founder of a clothmaking company, and Hermann Ploucquet, a taxidermist.
