= Hermann Ploucquet =

German taxidermist (1816–1878)

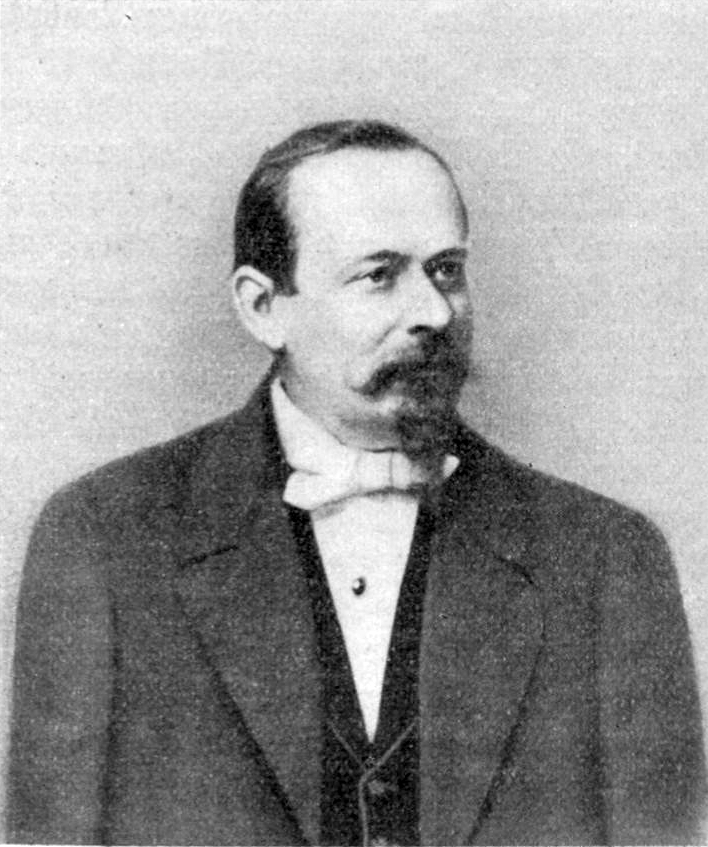
- Hermann Ploucquet in 1878
- Born: 12 April 1816; Stuttgart, Kingdom of Württemberg
- Died: 16 February 1878 (aged 61); Stuttgart, Kingdom of Württemberg
- Occupation: Taxidermist

Hermann Ploucquet (12 April 1816 – 16 February 1878) was a German naturalist and taxidermist best known for his works of anthropomorphic taxidermy. Born in Stuttgart in what was then the Kingdom of Württemberg, Ploucquet was employed as a taxidermist in the royal natural history cabinet of Stuttgart from 1833 to 1858. A collection of his work displayed at the 1851 Great Exhibition in London is credited with popularising the practice of anthropomorphised novelty taxidermy in the United Kingdom.

== Life and work ==
Etchings of Ploucquet's taxidermy at the 1851 Great Exhibition by George Cruikshank

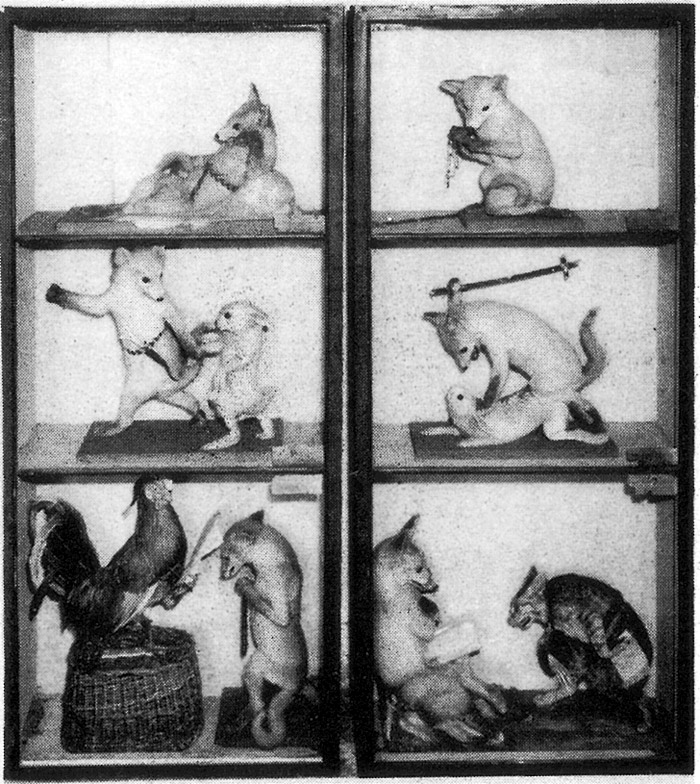
Ploucquet's dioramas depicting the fable of Reynard the Fox

Hermann Ploucquet was born on 12 April 1816 in Stuttgart in what was then the Kingdom of Württemberg. He was the youngest child of a dyer and the daughter of an agricultural inspector, and his ancestors were Huguenots who emigrated from Lyon in 1685 and settled in Stuttgart – among these ancestors were Gottfried Ploucquet and his son Wilhelm Gottfried Ploucquet, both professors at the University of Tübingen. As a child, Ploucquet learnt taxidermy methods from an instructional book and began catching and preparing small wild animals. He would sell these mounts, as well as taking on commission work mounting deceased pets, and used these earnings to support his parents. After completing an apprenticeship with the royal gardener, he began working as an assistant preparator in the royal natural history cabinet in Stuttgart in 1833, aged seventeen. He continued taking commissions and preparing mounts for private collectors during this time, including works of anthropomorphic taxidermy wearing clothes sewn by his sister Pauline.

Ploucquet was promoted to the role of chief taxidermist of the royal natural history cabinet in 1847. Having received positive newspaper coverage for his taxidermy and winning a medal at a trade fair in Leipzig in 1850, Ploucquet entered a collection of his work in the Great Exhibition of 1851 in London. His entries included both anthropomorphic and non-anthropomorphic works. The non-anthropomorphic works included scenes of predators and their prey – hunting birds of prey, polecats raiding a hawk's nest, groups of hounds baiting a boar and bringing down a stag – as well as more peaceful scenes of frolicking fox cubs and domestic birds with their young. Though a critic writing in the Illustrated London News on 26 July 1951 called the hunting scenes "disgustingly painful" and "absolutely revolting", he also noted that the scenes drew artistic inspiration from popular depictions of hunting in painting and sculpture at the time, particularly the work of Frans Snijders. The anthropomorphic works included weasels hunting hares, duelling dormice, kittens drinking tea, ice-skating hedgehogs, shaving frogs, and a weasel schoolmaster disciplining rabbit students. The most famous of these anthropomorphic works was a set of mounts illustrating the fable of Reynard the Fox, based on Wilhelm von Kaulbach's 1846 illustrations of Johann Wolfgang von Goethe's poem The Story of Reynard the Fox.

The collection was described by contemporary magazine The Athenaeum as a "most popular group of objects in the Glass Palace" and drew praise from Queen Victoria, who described the collection in her diary as "really marvellous". A reviewer for The Morning Chronicle wrote that "the animals borrow exaggerated expression, without losing their brute looks" and that "[English] artists would do well to note what constitutes the inimitable expression of these small animals". An entry on Ploucquet's mounts in the 1851 Great Exhibition Official Descriptive and Illustrated Catalog spans several paragraphs, notable among the two-or-three-line entries afforded to other displays. French photographer Antoine Claudet captured daguerreotypes of Ploucquet's mounts during the exhibition and wood engravings of these would be published as a book, The Comical Creatures from Wurtemberg, in August 1851. Claudet's original daguerreotypes are now lost.

Ploucquet left his position at the royal natural history cabinet in 1858 to found a private museum, with his post as chief taxidermist succeeded by Martin Hinrich Lichtenstein. In the mid-1860s the site of Plocuquet's museum was seized under eminent domain to build a railway – he received compensation for the seizure and was able to temporarily house the collection at a nearby site before moving the museum to Vienna. However, he was forced to return to Stuttgart following the outbreak of the Austro-Prussian War in 1866. Shortly after returning to Stuttgart he sold his collection and, reportedly almost blind since departing the royal natural history cabinet in 1858, he did not produce any taxidermy mounts after this point.

== Death and legacy ==
Ploucquet died in Stuttgart on 16 February 1878. Some of his surviving works are held in private collections. In the years prior to his death he sold much of his taxidermy collection to the operators of the Mineral Baths Berg, who went on to resell it in 1873 to the operators of the Crystal Palace permanent exhibition in Sydenham Hill, United Kingdom. Ploucquet's collection remained on display there until it was lost in the 1936 fire that destroyed the Crystal Palace. His most famous work, the six-piece diorama depicting the fable of Reynard the Fox, was owned by the Leigh family and kept at Stoneleigh Abbey in Warwickshire for several decades until it was sold at auction by Christie's in 1981. It is now held in a private collection.

Ploucquet's work, particularly the dioramas presented at the Great Exhibition in 1851, is credited with popularising the practice of anthropomorphised novelty taxidermy in the United Kingdom, and may have inspired the work of English taxidermist Walter Potter. German-British zoologist and taxidermist Albert Günther, who studied under Ploucquet in the 1850s, referred to him in a letter as "a perfect artist and the greatest taxidermist then living".
