= Soap Plant / Wacko =

Store in California

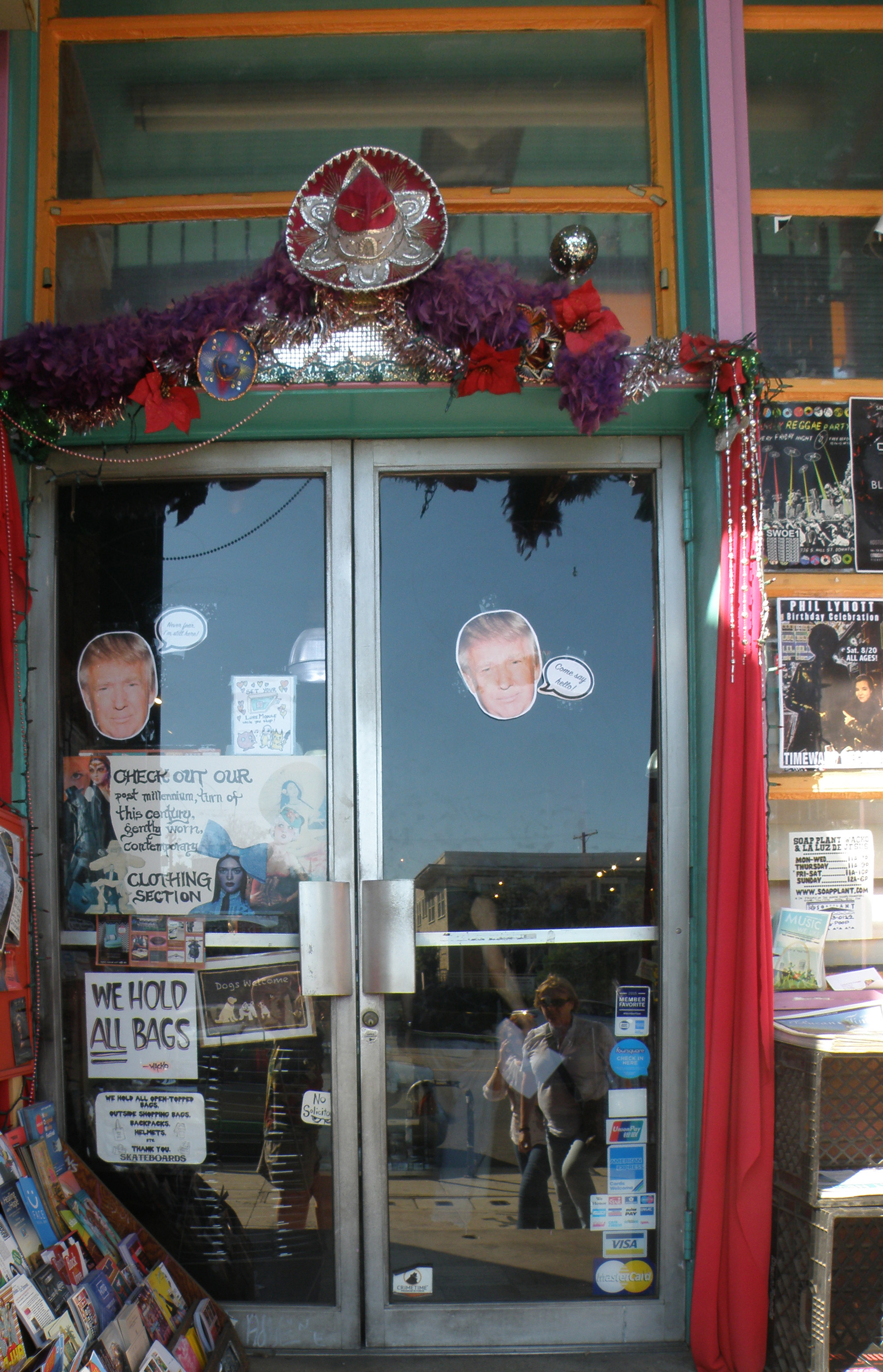
- Entrance to the store in 2016
- Coordinates: 34.1002°N 118.2900°W
- Address: 4633 Hollywood Blvd, Los Angeles, CA 90027
- Opened: June 19, 1971
- Owner: Billy Shire
- Floor area: 10,000 sq ft (930 m^{2})
- Website: www.wackola.com

Soap Plant / Wacko is a store in the Los Feliz neighborhood of Los Angeles, California. It is known for selling eclectic and novelty items, making it a popular attraction. Its inventory contains over 10,000 unique items. The La Luz de Jesus art gallery is located in the store.

== History ==
The store opened on June 19, 1971, as Soap Plant. It was originally a family-run shop, with each member producing certain products. Peter and Billy Shire created ceramic items and leatherware, while their father, Hank, made graphics and their mother, Barbara produced soaps. Billy's flamboyant leather creations attracted clients such as Elton John and the New York Dolls. One of his denim jackets won a design competition that was sponsored by Levi Strauss & Co. in 1973, further increasing his popularity. It was later shown in an exhibition at the Los Angeles County Museum of Art. In the early 1980s, Billy assumed sole control of the shop and moved it to a larger location at Melrose Avenue. With more space, he included more varieties of items in the store, including books and jewelry. Billy opened Wacko in 1984 after some adjacent stores became vacant. He also established the La Luz de Jesus art gallery on Soap Plant's top floor in 1986. Billy returned to the original location in 1995, bringing over his other ventures there too.

== Description ==
The Soap Plant sells a large variety of soaps, oils, and lotions. They are all hand-made. Wacko mainly sells pop culture toys and miscellaneous products but also has one of the largest collections of postcards in Los Angeles. Many celebrities, including Johnny Depp, Jack Nicholson, and Madonna, have visited the shop.
