= Taxidermy =

Stuffing and mounting dead animals for display

Selection of British Bats Taxidermy, Cumberland House Natural History Museum

Taxidermy is the art of preserving an animal's body by mounting (over an armature) or stuffing, for the purpose of display or study. Animals are often, but not always, portrayed in a lifelike state. The word taxidermy describes the process of preserving the animal, but the word is also used to describe the end product, which are called taxidermy mounts or referred to simply as "taxidermy".

The word taxidermy is derived from the Ancient Greek words τάξις taxis (order, arrangement) and δέρμα derma (skin). Thus taxidermy translates to "arrangement of skin".

Taxidermy is practiced primarily on vertebrates (mammals, birds, fish, reptiles, and less commonly on amphibians) but can also be done to larger insects and arachnids under some circumstances. Taxidermy takes on a number of forms and purposes including hunting trophies and natural history museum displays. Unlike meat harvesting, taxidermy does not require killing an animal that could have otherwise remained alive. Museums use taxidermy as a method to record species, including those that are extinct and threatened, in the form of study skins and life-size mounts. Taxidermy is sometimes also used as a means to memorialize pets.

A person who practices taxidermy is called a taxidermist. They may practice professionally, catering to museums and sportspeople (hunters and fishers), or as amateurs (hobbyists). A taxidermist is aided by familiarity with anatomy, sculpture, painting, and tanning.

== History ==
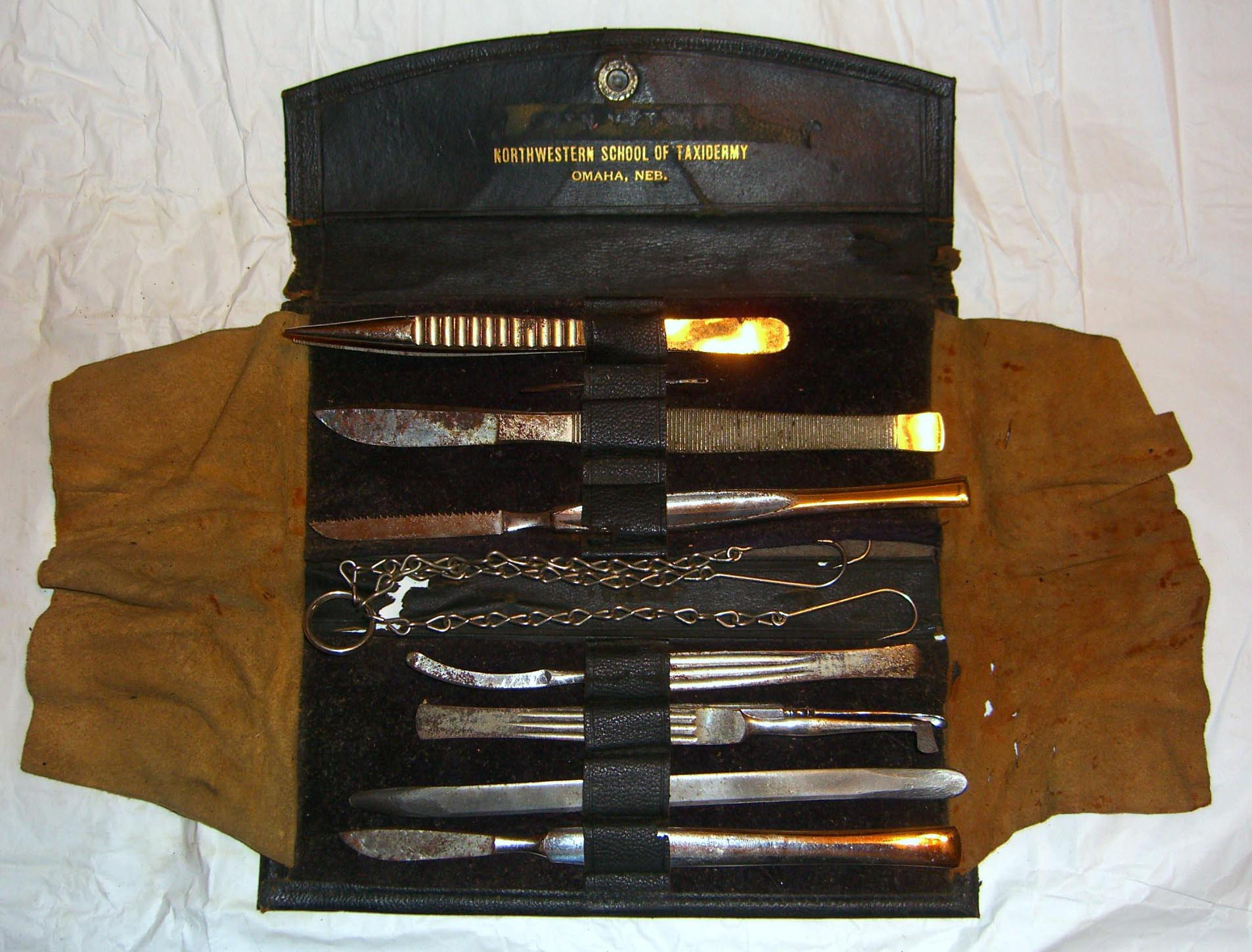
Theodore Roosevelt's taxidermy kit, private collection

=== Tanning and early stuffing techniques ===
Preserving animal skins has been practiced throughout human history. For example, embalmed animals have been found with Egyptian mummies.

In Tenochtitlan, the capital of the Aztec Empire, taxidermy was a common practice, not only for preserving animals, but also because it held a deep symbolic value within Aztec culture. Eagles had the most symbolic impact; a particular cut mark on an eagle's skull indicates its having received treatment to taxidermize it. An important find in the remains of Tenochtitlan is twelve golden eagles that were found near the monolith of the goddess Tlaltecuhtli. The eagles were found dressed with copper anklets and pectorals of wood on their chests. Through intricate ritual events with different objects, including the taxidermized eagle skulls, the people of Tenochtitlan believed that they could create a link between the earthly and the divine.

Although embalming incorporates lifelike poses, it is not considered taxidermy. In the Middle Ages, crude examples of taxidermy were displayed by astrologers and apothecaries. The earliest methods of preservation of birds for natural history cabinets were published in 1748 by René-Antoine Ferchault de Réaumur in France. Techniques for mounting were described in 1752 by M. B. Stollas. There were several pioneers of taxidermy in France, Germany, Denmark, and England. For a while, clay was used to shape some of the soft parts, but this made specimens heavy.

By the 18th century, a majority of towns had a tannery business. It was around the same time, with the work of Jean-Baptiste Bécœur in particular, that taxidermy became a more serious practice. Louis Dufresne, a taxidermist at the Muséum National d'Histoire Naturelle in France, rediscovered Bécœur's taxidermy process using arsenical soap and made it known through an article in the Nouveau dictionnaire d'histoire naturelle (1803–1804). This technique enabled the museum to build an immense collection of taxidermy birds. In the 19th century, some hunters took their trophies to upholstery shops, where the upholsterers would sew up the animal skins and stuff them with rags and cotton. The term "stuffing" or a "stuffed animal" evolved from this crude form of taxidermy. Professional taxidermists prefer the term "mounting" to "stuffing". More sophisticated cotton-wrapped wire bodies supporting sewn-on cured skins soon followed.

Dufresne's methods spread to England in the early 19th century, where updated and non-toxic methods of preservation were developed by some of the leading naturalists of the day, including Rowland Ward and Montague Brown. Ward established one of the earliest taxidermy firms, Rowland Ward Ltd. of Piccadilly. However, the art of taxidermy remained relatively undeveloped, and the specimens remained stiff and unconvincing.

Between 1887 and 1894, many naturalist scientists from all over the world went to Costa Rica to research its bird wildlife. At that time, Costa Rica had unique bird species not found in other parts of the world. For environmental reasons, it was difficult for scientists to maintain the specimens in good condition, so they used stuffing techniques to preserve the specimens for later analysis. Dry-tanning was common among the natives of Costa Rica during this time-period as well.

=== Taxidermy as art ===
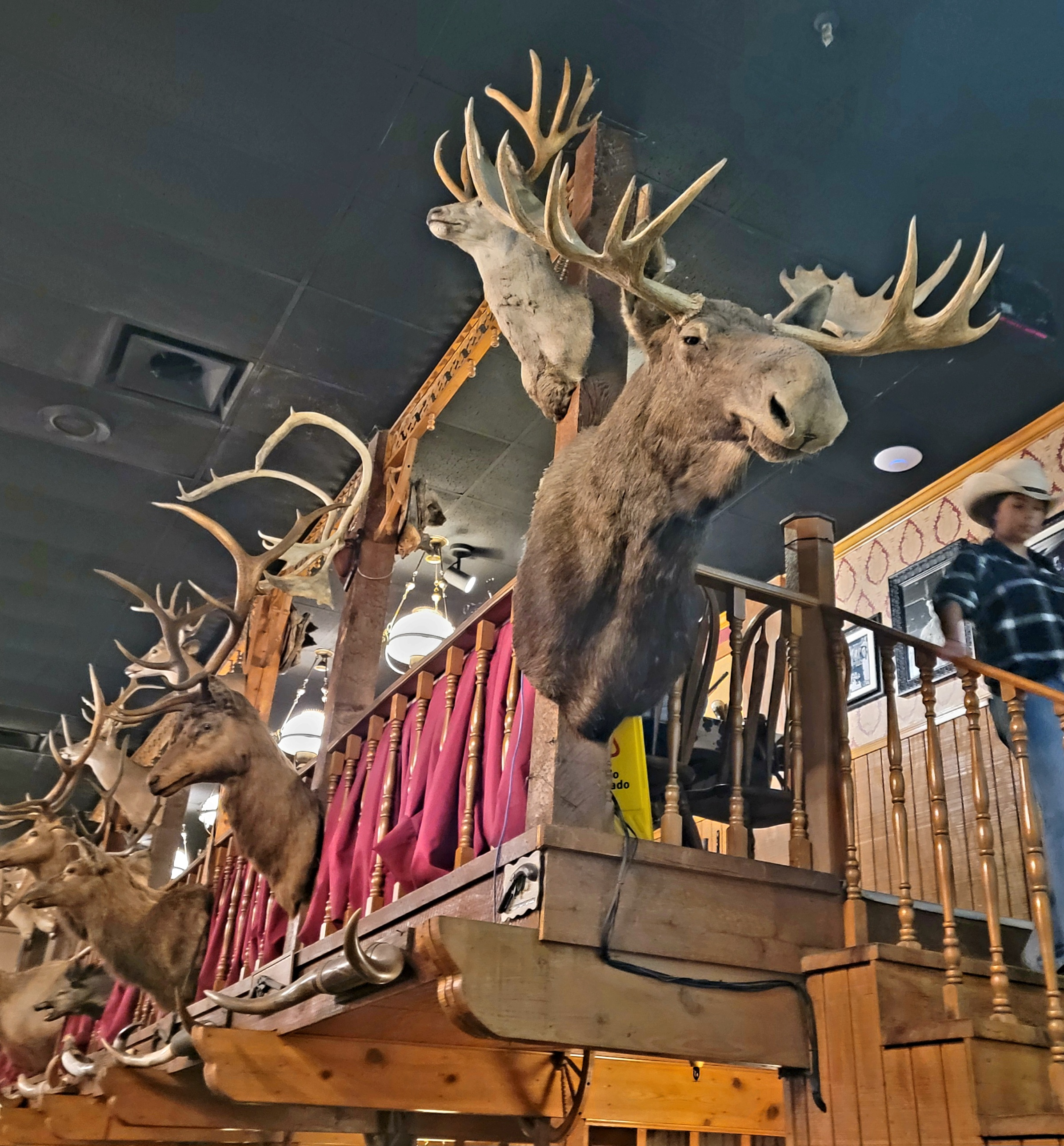
Taxidermied moose and deer heads at the Big Texan Steak Ranch in Amarillo, Texas

The golden age of taxidermy was during the Victorian era, when mounted animals became a popular part of interior design and decor. English ornithologist John Hancock is considered to be the father of modern taxidermy. An avid collector of birds, which he had shot personally, he began modeling them with clay and casting in plaster.

For the Great Exhibition of 1851 in London, he mounted a series of stuffed birds as an exhibit. They generated much interest among the public and scientists alike who considered them superior to earlier models, and they were regarded as the first lifelike and artistic specimens on display. A judge remarked that Hancock's exhibit "... will go far towards raising the art of taxidermy to a level with other arts which have hitherto held higher pretensions".

Hancock's display sparked great national interest in taxidermy, and amateur and professional collections for public view proliferated rapidly. Displays of birds were particularly common in middle-class Victorian homes – even Queen Victoria amassed an impressive bird collection. Taxidermy was also increasingly used by the bereaved owners of dead pets to 'resurrect' them.

=== Anthropomorphic taxidermy ===
Walter Potter's Rabbit School, 1930s

In the late 19th century, a style known as anthropomorphic taxidermy became popular. A 'Victorian whimsy', mounted animals were dressed as people or displayed as if engaged in human activities. An early example of this genre was displayed by Herman Ploucquet, from Stuttgart, Germany, at the Great Exhibition in London.

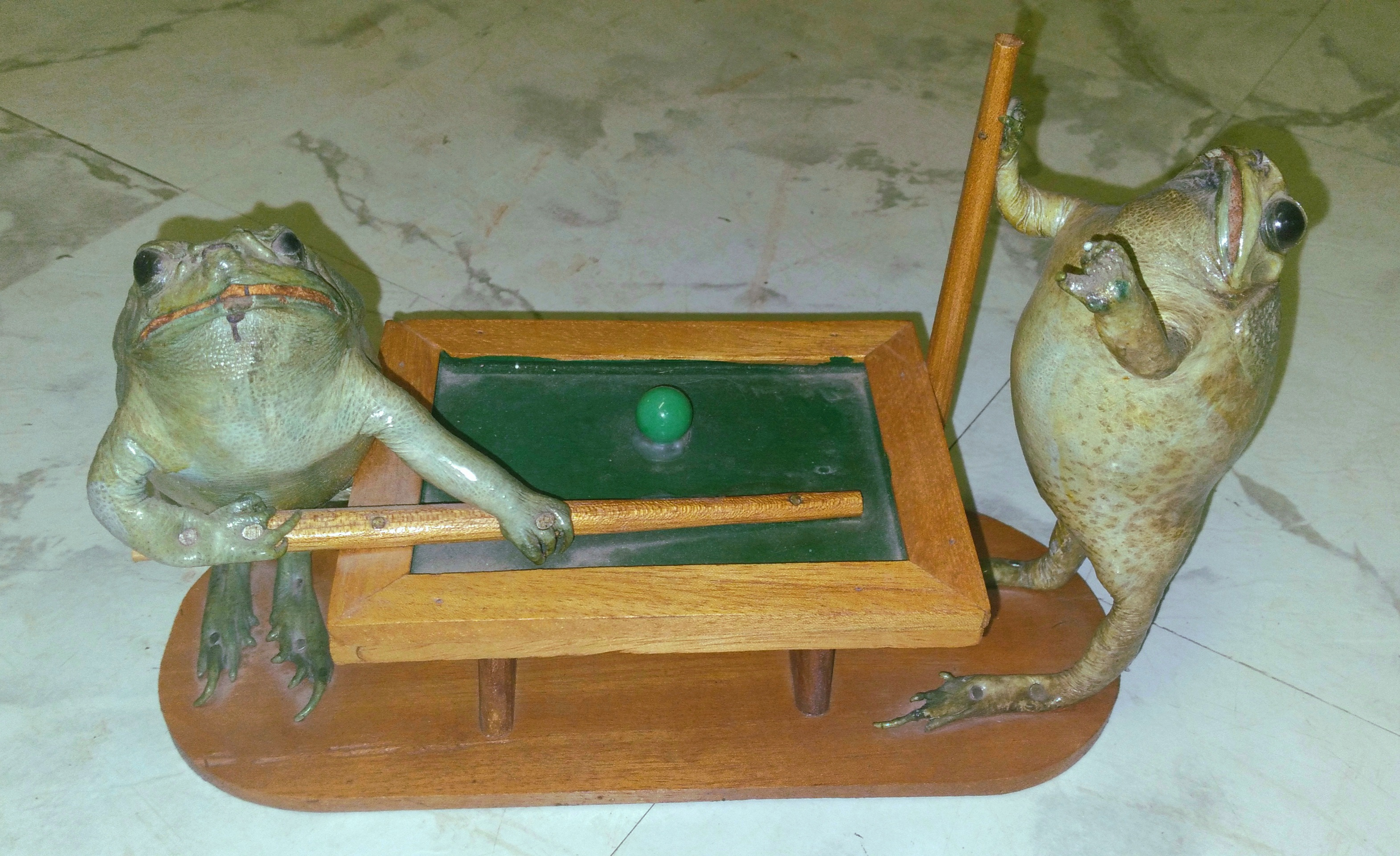
Taxidermy frogs playing pool.

The best-known practitioner in this genre was the English taxidermist Walter Potter, whose most famous work was The Death and Burial of Cock Robin. Among his other scenes were "a rat's den being raided by the local police rats ... [a] village school ... featuring 48 little rabbits busy writing on tiny slates, while the Kittens' Tea Party displayed feline etiquette and a game of croquet." Apart from the simulations of human situations, he had also added examples of bizarrely deformed animals such as two-headed lambs and four-legged chickens. Potter's museum was so popular that an extension was built to the platform at Bramber railway station.

Other Victorian taxidermists known for their iconic anthropomorphic taxidermy work are William Hart and his son Edward Hart. They gained recognition with their famous series of dioramas featuring boxing squirrels. Both William and Edward created multiple sets of these dioramas. One 4-piece set of boxing squirrel dioramas (circa 1850) sold at auction in 2013 for record prices. The four dioramas were created as a set (with each diorama portraying the squirrels at a different stage during their boxing match); however, the set was broken up and each was sold separately at the same auction. The set was one of a number they created over the years featuring boxing squirrels.

World Famous Gopher Hole Museum Jungle Diorama Torrington Gopher Hole Museum

Famous examples of modern anthropomorphic taxidermy include the work of artist Adele Morse, who gained international attention with her "Stoned Fox" sculpture series, and the work of artist Sarina Brewer, known for her Siamese twin squirrels and flying monkeys partaking in human activities. The Torrington Gopher Hole Museum in Alberta, Canada is a small, rural museum filled with taxidermied Richardson's ground squirrels in whimsical Diorama.

=== 20th century ===
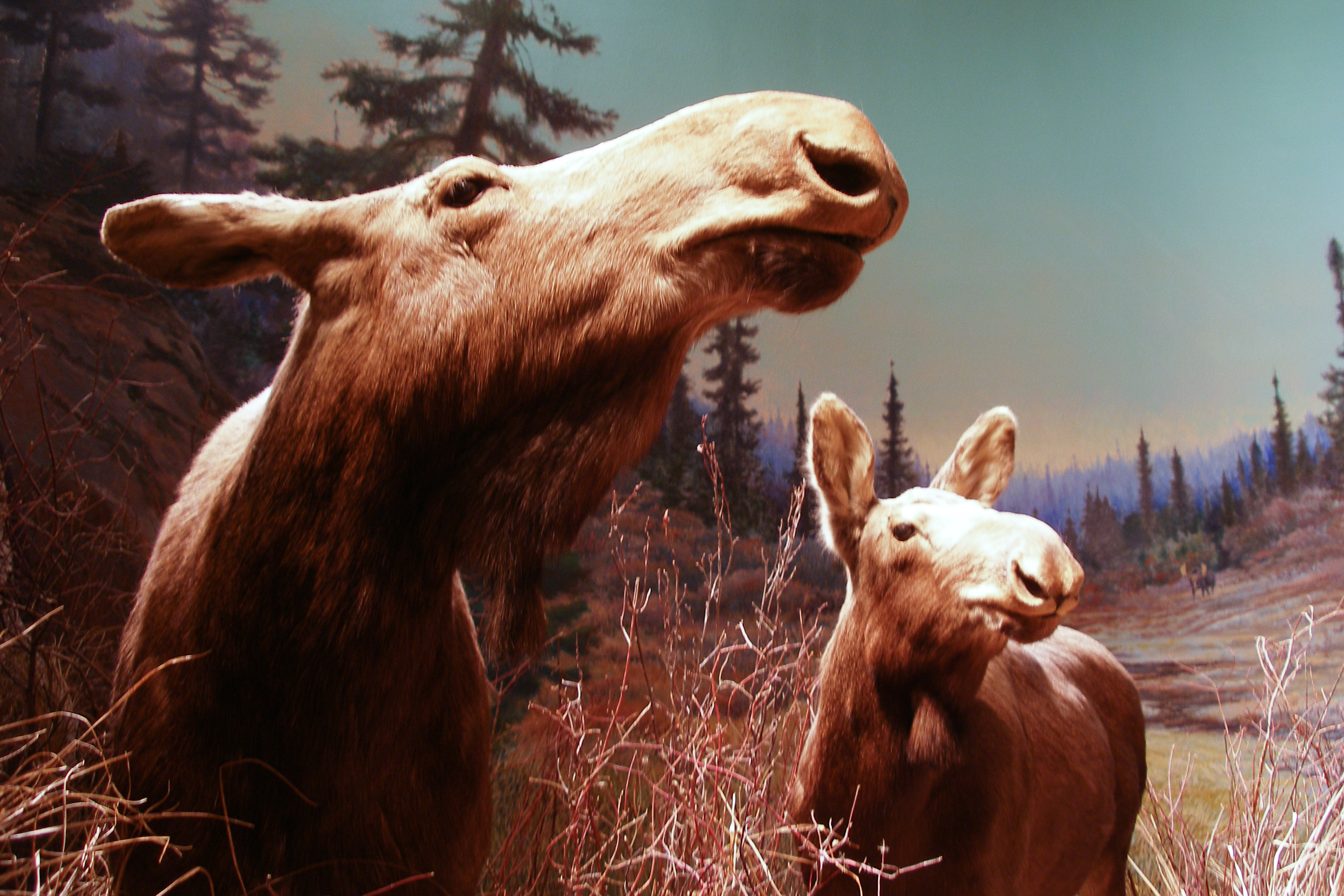
Mother moose and calf diorama, Manitoba Museum

In the early 20th century, taxidermy was taken forward under the leadership of artists such as Carl Akeley, James L. Clark, William T. Hornaday, Coleman Jonas, Fredrick, and William Kaempfer, and Leon Pray. These and other taxidermists developed anatomically accurate figures which incorporated every detail in artistically interesting poses, with mounts in realistic settings and poses that were considered more appropriate for the species. This was quite a change from the caricatures popularly offered as hunting trophies.

Additional modern uses of taxidermy have been the use of "faux taxidermy" or fake animal heads that draw on the inspiration of traditional taxidermy. Decorating with sculpted fake animal heads that are painted in different colors has become a popular trend in interior design.

=== Rogue taxidermy ===
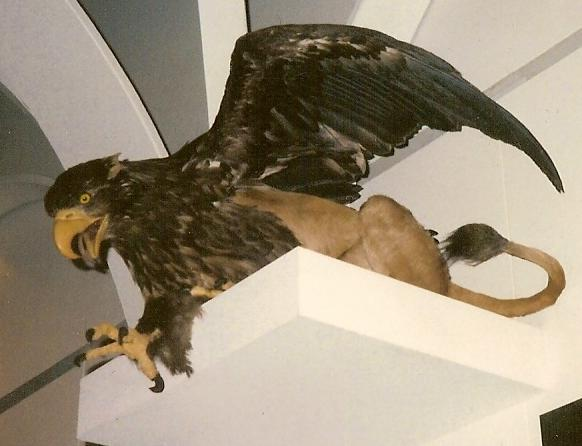
An example of rogue taxidermy in the form of a griffin, exhibited in the Zoological Museum, Copenhagen

Rogue taxidermy (sometimes referred to as "taxidermy art" or "botched taxidermy") is a form of mixed media sculpture. Rogue taxidermy art references traditional trophy or natural history museum taxidermy, but is not always constructed out of taxidermied animals; it can be constructed entirely from synthetic materials. Additionally, rogue taxidermy is not necessarily figurative, as it can be abstract and does not need to resemble an animal. It can be a small decorative object or a large-scale room-sized installation. There is a very broad spectrum of styles within the genre, some of which falls into the category of mainstream art. "Rogue taxidermy" describes a wide variety of work, including work that is classified and exhibited as fine art. Neither the term, nor the genre, emerged from the world of traditional taxidermy. The genre was born from forms of fine art that utilize some of the components found in the construction of a traditional taxidermy mount. The term "rogue taxidermy" was coined in 2004 by an artist collective called The Minnesota Association of Rogue Taxidermists. The Minneapolis-based group was founded by artists Sarina Brewer, Scott Bibus, and Robert Marbury as a means to unite their respective mediums and differing styles of sculpture. The definition of rogue taxidermy set forth by the individuals who formed the genre (Brewer, Bibus, and Marbury) is: "A genre of pop-surrealist art characterized by mixed media sculptures containing conventional taxidermy-related materials that are used in an unconventional manner". Interest in the collective's work gave rise to an artistic movement referred to as the Rogue Taxidermy art movement, or alternately, the Taxidermy Art movement. Apart from describing a genre of fine art, the term "rogue taxidermy" has expanded in recent years and has also become an adjective applied to unorthodox forms of traditional taxidermy such as anthropomorphic mounts and composite mounts where two or more animals are spliced together. (e.g.; sideshow gaffs of conjoined "freak" animals and mounts of jackalopes or other fictional creatures) In addition to being the impetus for the art movement, the inception of the genre also marked a resurgence of interest in conventional (traditional) forms of taxidermy.

== Methods ==
=== Traditional skin-mount ===
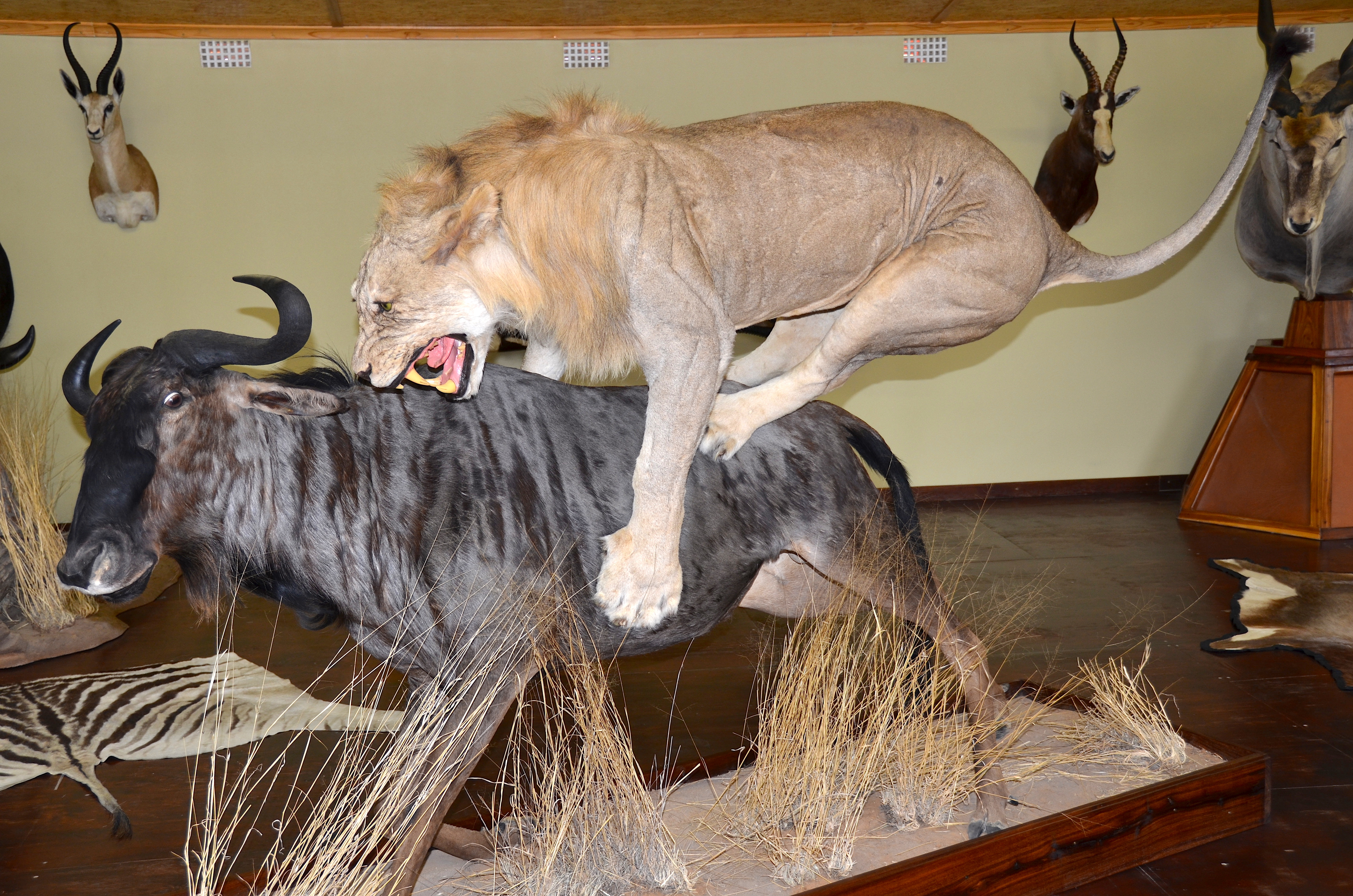
Two examples of traditional skin-mounts, a Lion and Blue Wildebeest from Namibia

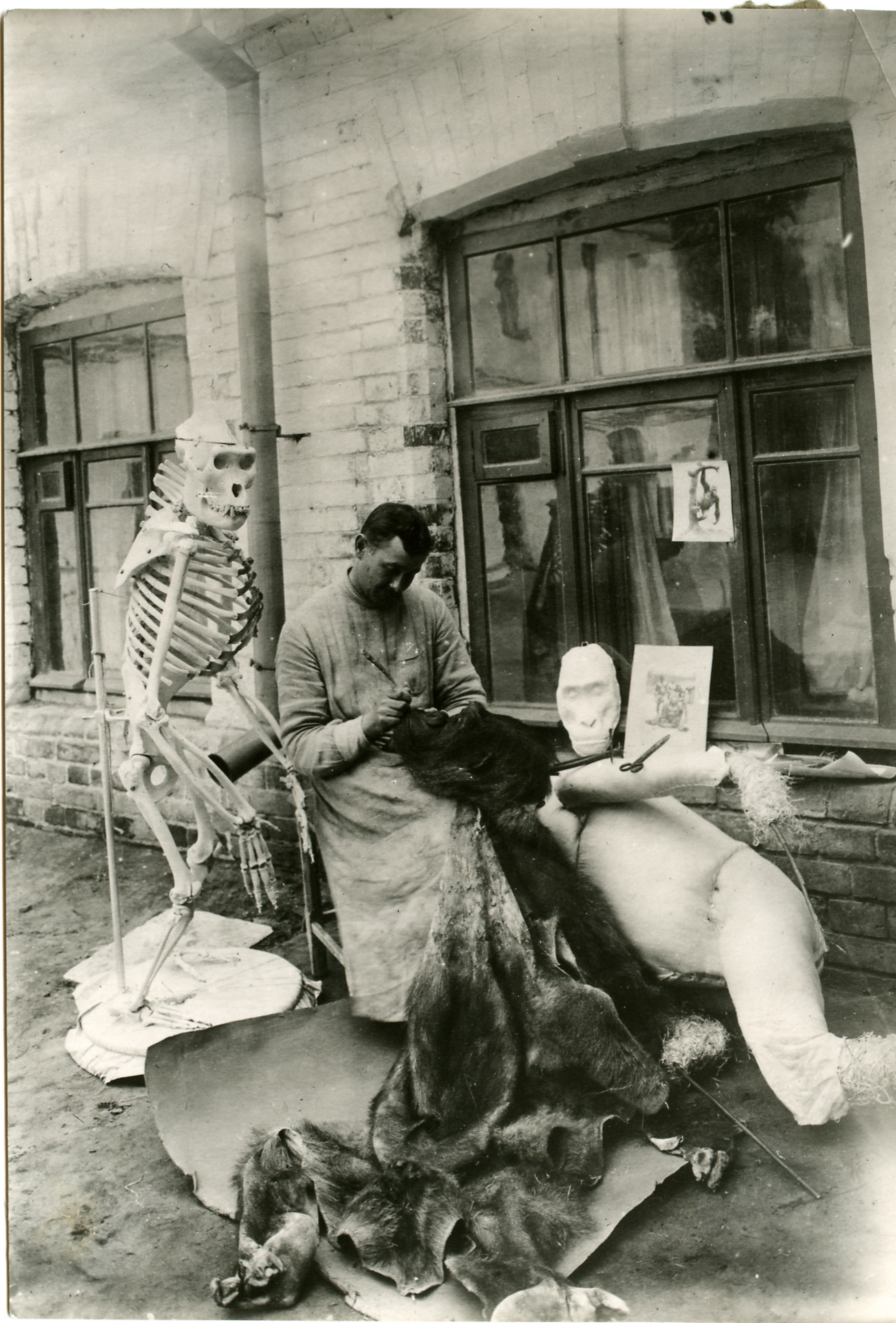
Russian taxidermist F. E. Fedulov preparing a mount of a gorilla for the State Darwin Museum.

The methods taxidermists practice have been improved over the last century, heightening taxidermic quality and lowering toxicity. The animal is first skinned in a process similar to removing the skin from a chicken prior to cooking. This can be accomplished without opening the body cavity, so the taxidermist usually does not see internal organs or blood. Depending on the type of skin, preserving chemicals are applied or the skin is tanned. It is then either mounted on a mannequin made from wood, wool, and wire, or a polyurethane form. Clay is used to install glass eyes and can also be used for facial features like cheekbones and a prominent brow bone. Modeling clay can be used to reform features as well; if the appendage was torn or damaged, clay can hold it together and add muscle detail. Forms and eyes are commercially available from a number of suppliers. If not, taxidermists carve or cast their own forms.

Taxidermists seek to continually maintain their skills to ensure attractive, lifelike results. Mounting an animal has long been considered an art form, often involving months of work; not all modern taxidermists trap or hunt for prized specimens.

Animal specimens can be frozen, then thawed at a later date to be skinned and tanned. Numerous measurements are taken of the body. A traditional method that remains popular today involves retaining the original skull and leg bones of a specimen and using these as the basis to create a mannequin made primarily from wood wool (previously tow or hemp wool was used) and galvanised wire. Another method is to mould the carcass in plaster, and then make a copy of the animal using one of several methods. A final mould is then made of polyester resin and glass cloth, from which a polyurethane form is made for final production. The carcass is then removed and the mould is used to produce a cast of the animal called a 'form'. Forms can also be made by sculpting the animal first in clay. Many companies produce stock forms in various sizes. Glass eyes are then usually added to the display, and in some cases, artificial teeth, jaws, tongue, or for some birds, artificial beaks and legs can be used.

=== Freeze-dried mount ===
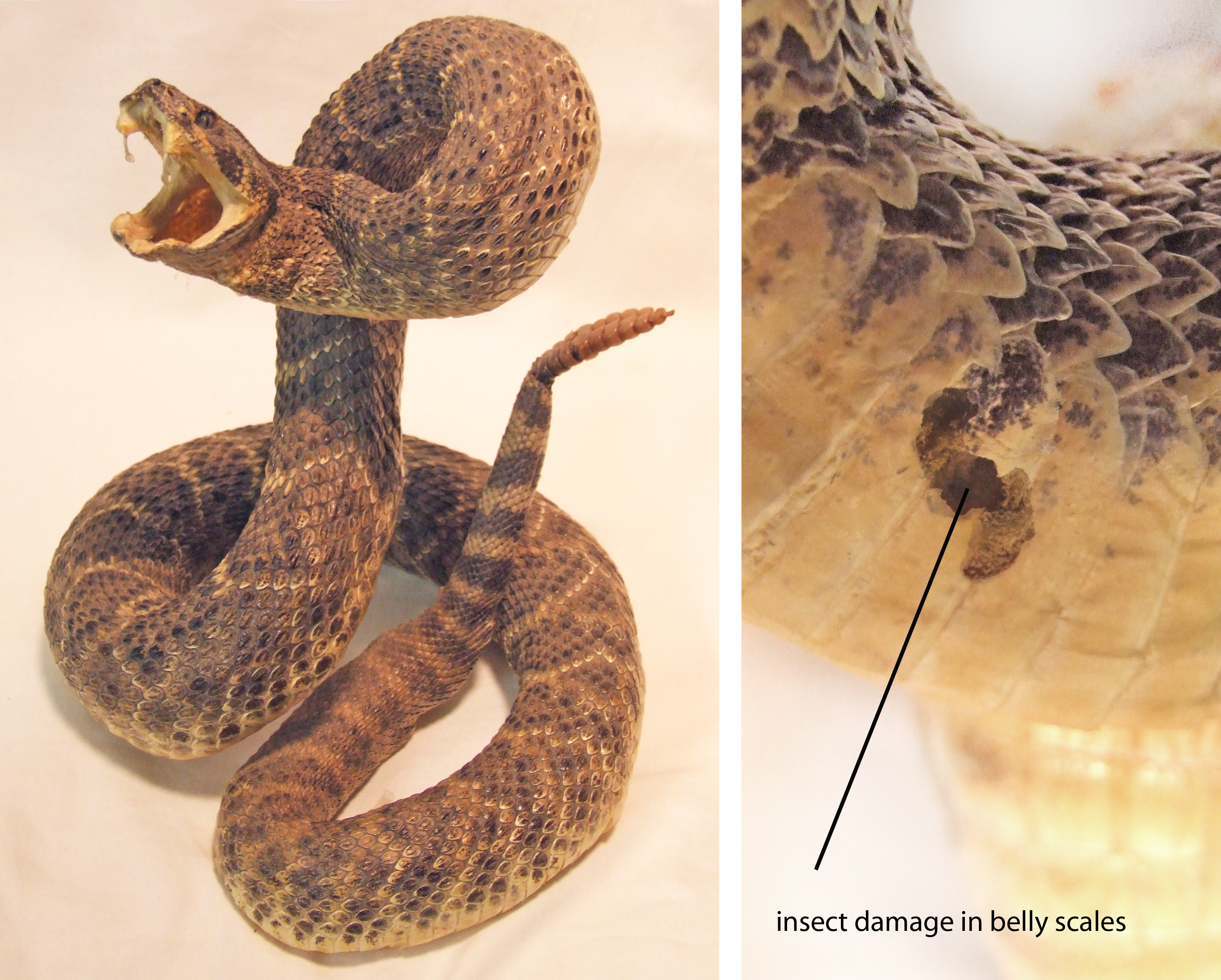
Example of dermestid beetle damage to a freeze-dried taxidermy mount of a rattlesnake

An increasingly popular trend is to freeze-dry the animal. For all intents and purposes, a freeze-dried mount is a mummified animal. The internal organs are removed during preparation; however, all other tissue remains in the body. (The skeleton and all accompanying musculature is still beneath the surface of the skin) The animal is positioned into the desired pose, then placed into the chamber of a special freeze-drying machine designed specifically for this application. The machine freezes the animal and also creates a vacuum in the chamber. Pressure in the chamber helps vaporize moisture in the animal's body, allowing it to dry out. The rate of drying depends on vapor pressure. (The higher the pressure, the faster the specimen dries.) Vapor pressure is determined by the temperature of the chamber; the higher the temperature, the higher the vapor pressure is at a given vacuum. The length of the dry-time is important because rapid freezing creates less tissue distortion (i.e.; shrinkage, warping, and wrinkling) The process can be done with reptiles, birds, and small mammals such as cats, rodents, and some dogs. Large specimens may require up to six months in the freeze dryer before they are completely dry. Freeze-drying is the most popular type of pet preservation. This is because it is the least invasive in terms of what is done to the animal's body after death, which is a concern of owners (Most owners do not opt for a traditional skin mount). In the case of large pets, such as dogs and cats, freeze-drying is also the best way to capture the animal's expression as it looked in life (another important concern of owners). Freeze-drying equipment is costly and requires much upkeep. The process is also time-consuming; therefore, freeze-drying is generally an expensive method to preserve an animal. The drawback to this method is that freeze-dried mounts are extremely susceptible to insect damage. This is because they contain large areas of dried tissue (meat and fat) for insects to feed upon. Traditional mounts are far less susceptible because they contain virtually no residual tissues (or none at all). Regardless of how well a taxidermy mount is prepared, all taxidermy is susceptible to insect damage. Taxidermy mounts are targeted by the same beetles and fabric moths that destroy wool sweaters and fur coats and that infest grains and flour in pantries.

=== Reproduction mount ===
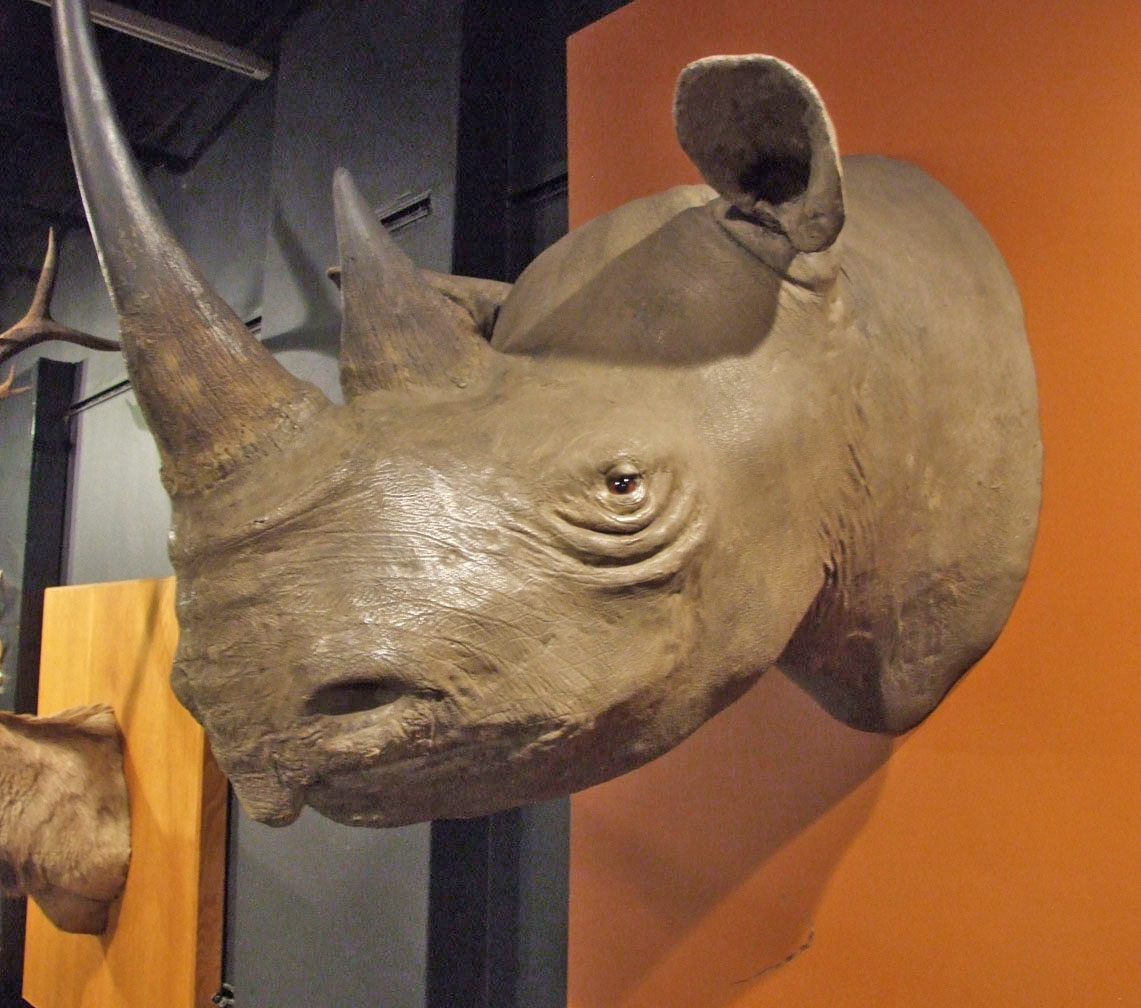
Reproduction mount of a rhinoceros made of fiberglass

Some methods of creating a trophy mount do not involve preserving the actual body of the animal. Instead, detailed photos and measurements are taken of the animal so a taxidermist can create an exact replica in resin or fiberglass that can be displayed in place of the real animal. No animals are killed in the creation of this type of trophy mount. One situation where this is practiced is in the world of sport fishing where catch and release is becoming increasingly prevalent. Reproduction mounts are commonly created for (among others) trout, bass, and large saltwater species such as the swordfish and blue marlin. Another situation where reproduction trophies are created is when endangered species are involved. Endangered and protected species, such as the rhinoceros, are hunted with rifles loaded with tranquilizer darts rather than real bullets. While the animal is unconscious, the hunter poses for photos with the animal while it is measured for the purpose of creating a replica, or to establish what size of prefabricated fiberglass trophy head can be purchased to most closely approximate the actual animal. The darted animal is not harmed. The hunter then displays the fiberglass head on the wall in lieu of the real animal's head to commemorate the experience of the hunt.

=== Re-creation mount ===
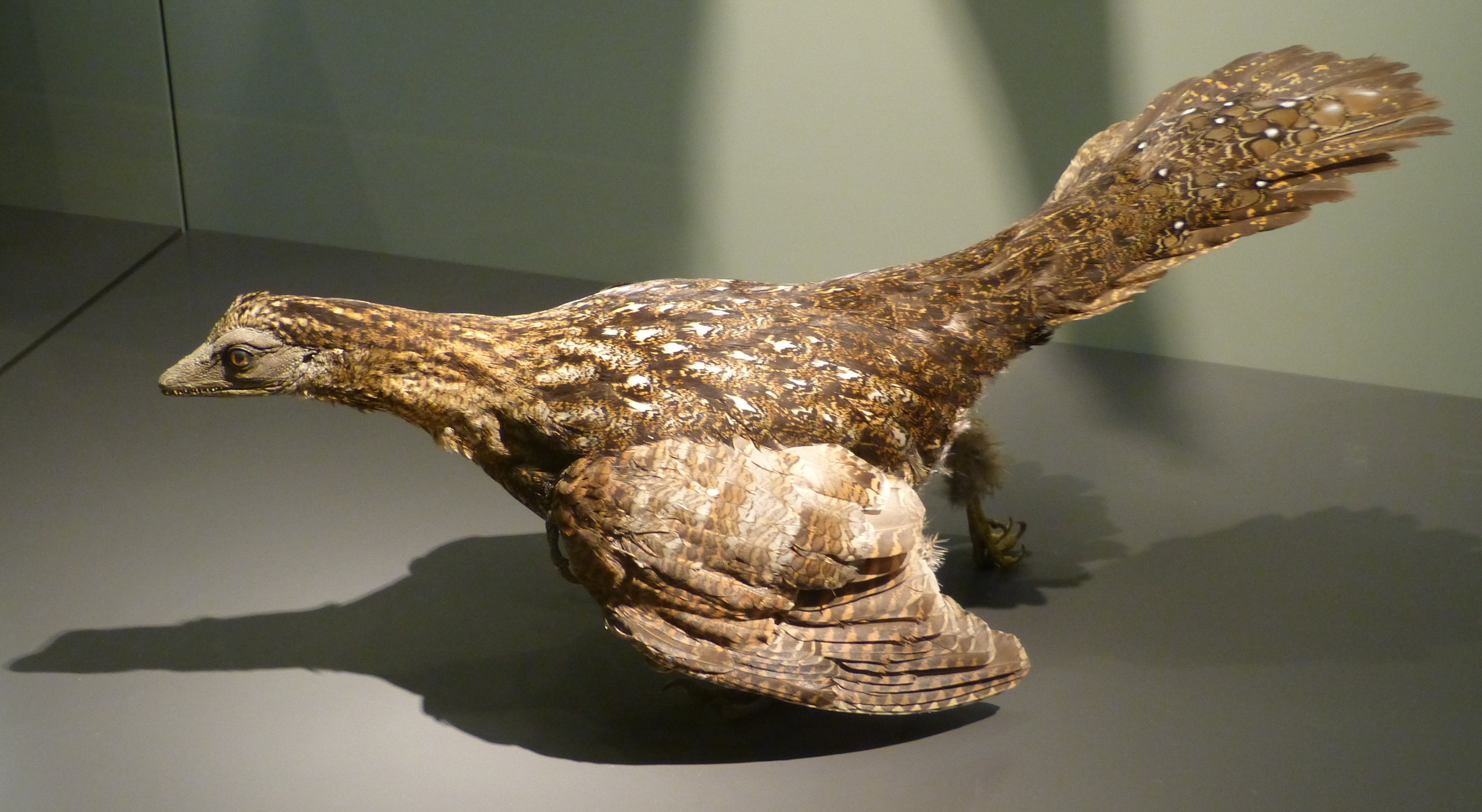
A taxidermy re-creation of an extinct avialan species, Archaeopteryx, created with the wings and feathers of an extant variety of grouse.

Re-creation mounts are accurate life-size representations of either extant or extinct species that are created using materials not found on the animal being rendered. They utilize the fur, feathers, and skin of other species of animals. According to the National Taxidermy Association: "Re-creations, for the purpose of this [competition] category, are defined as renderings which include no natural parts of the animal portrayed. A re-creation may include original carvings and sculptures. A re-creation may use natural parts, provided the parts are not from the species being portrayed. For instance, a re-creation eagle could be constructed using turkey feathers, or a cow hide could be used to simulate African game". A famous example of a re-creation mount is a giant panda created by taxidermist Ken Walker that he constructed out of dyed and bleached black bear fur.

=== Study skins ===
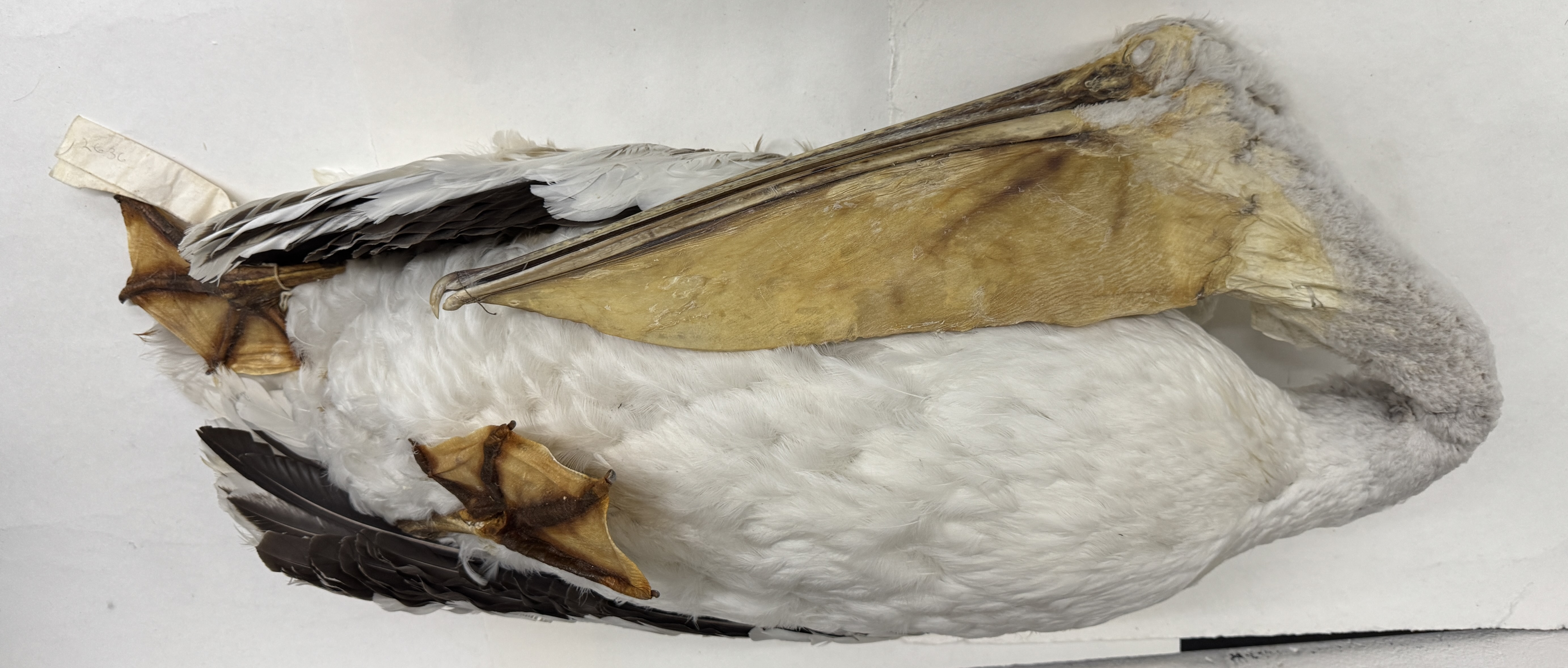
An American White Pelican taxidermized in a "study skins" style from the University of Wisconsin-Stevens Point's Ornithology Collection.

A study skin is a taxidermic zoological specimen prepared in a minimalistic fashion that is concerned only with preserving the animal's skin, not the shape of the animal's body. As the name implies, study skins are used for scientific study (research), and are housed mainly by museums. A study skin's sole purpose is to preserve data, not to replicate an animal in a lifelike state. Museums keep large collections of study skins in order to conduct comparisons of physical characteristics to other study skins of the same species. Study skins are also kept because DNA can be extracted from them when needed at any point in time.

A study skin's preparation is extremely basic. After the animal is skinned, fat is methodically scraped off the underside of the hide. The underside of the hide is then rubbed with borax or cedar dust to help it dry faster. The animal is then stuffed with cotton and sewn up. Mammals are laid flat on their belly. Birds are prepared lying on their back. Study skins are dried in these positions to keep the end product as slender and streamlined as possible so large numbers of specimens can be stored side-by-side in flat file drawers, while occupying a minimum amount of space. Since study skins are not prepared with aesthetics in mind they do not have imitation eyes like other taxidermy, and their cotton filling is visible in their eye openings.

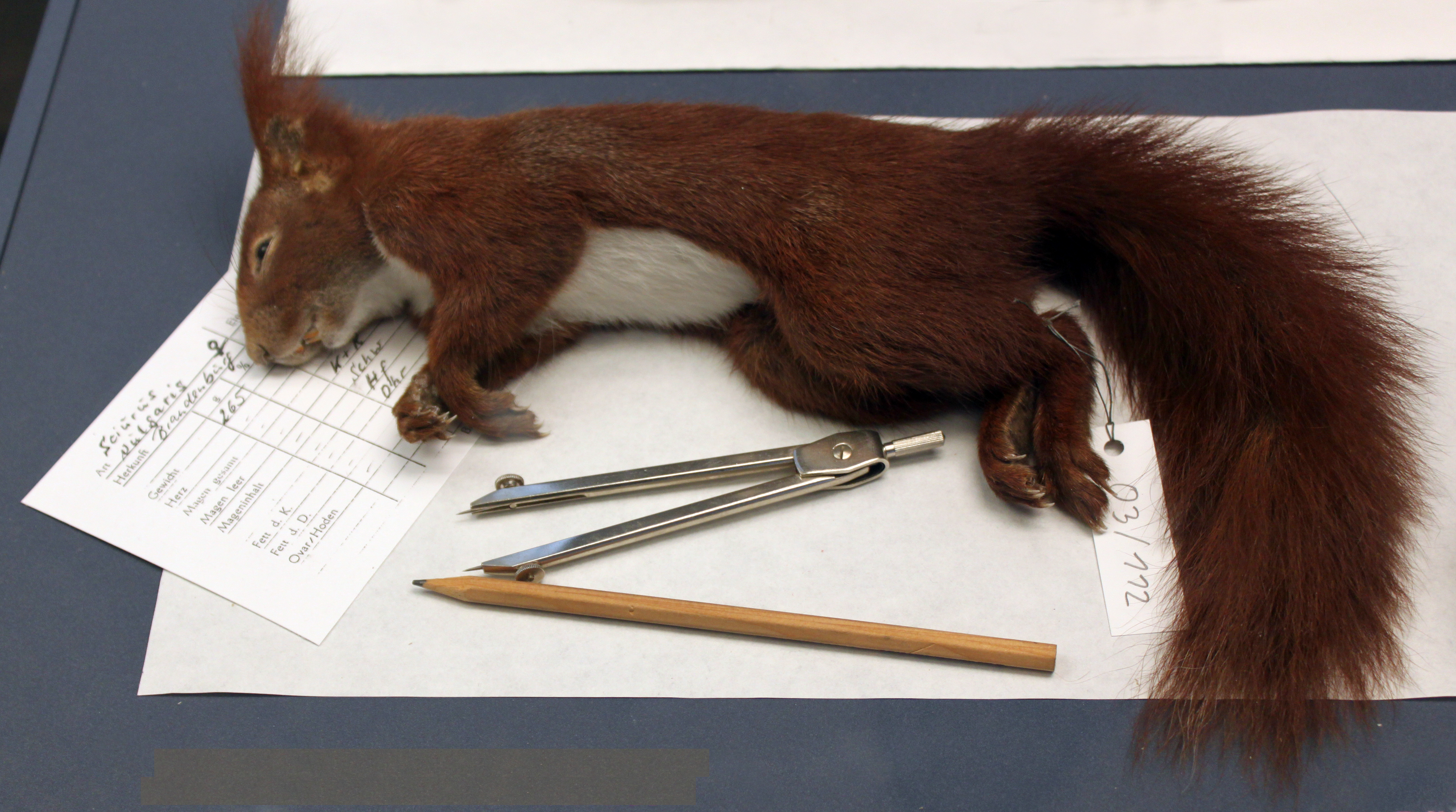
1. Measurements are collected

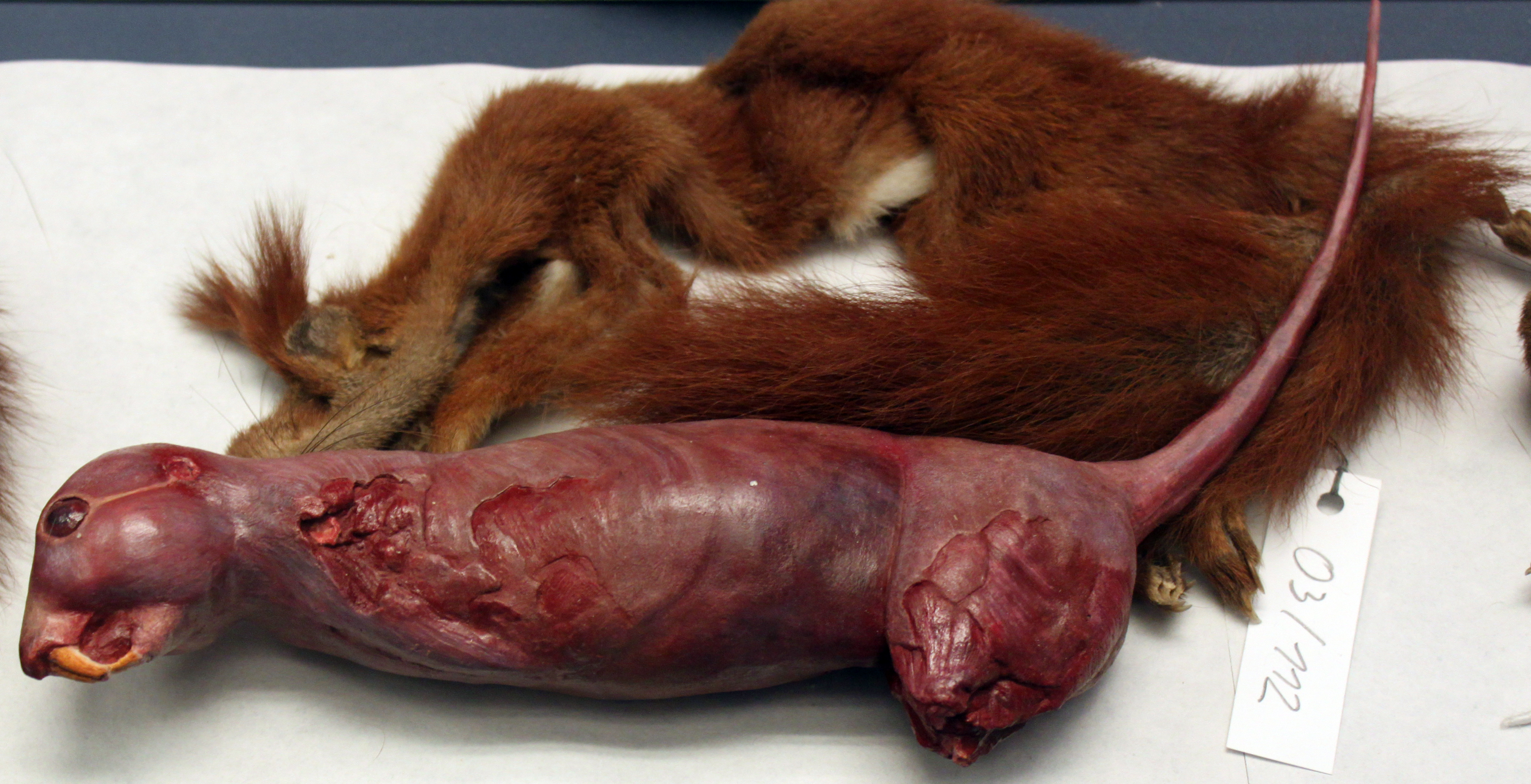
2. Animal is Skinned. Notes on internal organs are recorded

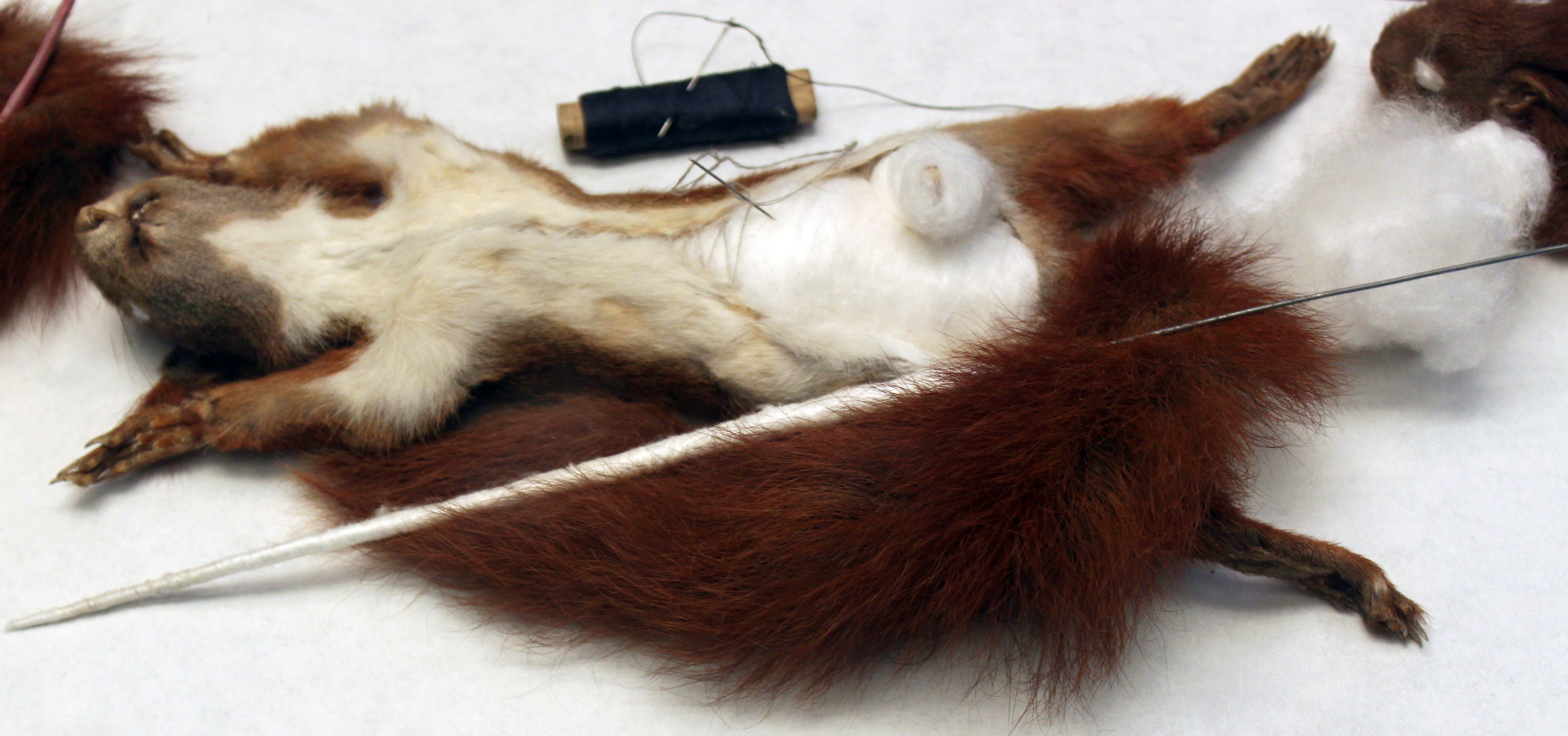
3. Skin is stuffed with cotton

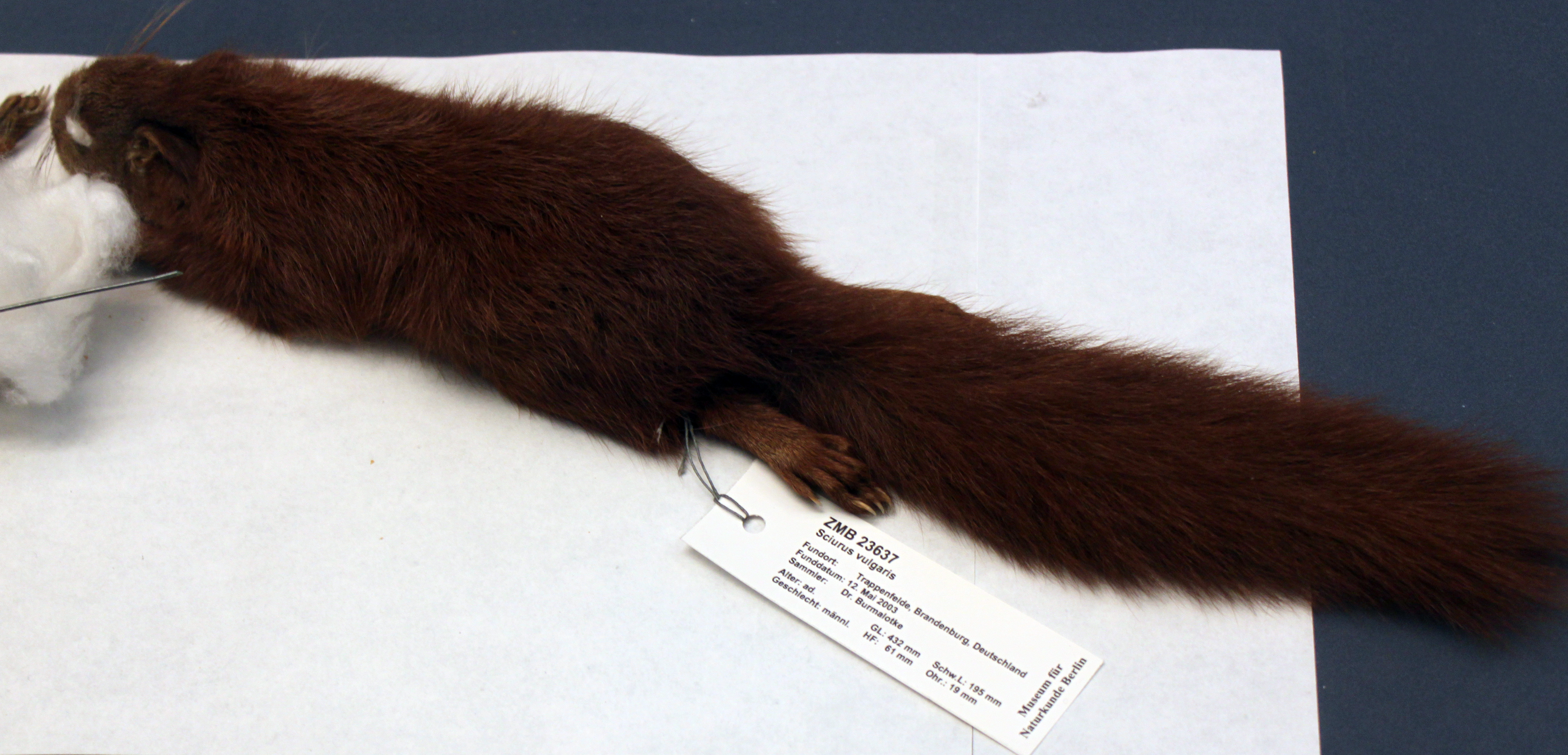
4. Completed study skin is labeled with a data tag

== Taxidermists ==
- Carl Akeley (1864–1926), the father of modern taxidermy
- Jean-Baptiste Bécœur (1718–1777), French ornithologist, taxidermist, and inventor of arsenical soap
- Harry Ferris Brazenor (1863–1948), 19th-century British taxidermist
- James Dickinson, MBE (1959–), retired British taxidermist, known for his restorations of existing specimens
- John Edmonstone (c. 1790-?), British-Guyanese taxidermist who taught Charles Darwin the art of taxidermy in 1825
- William Temple Hornaday (1854–1937), American zoologist, conservationist, and taxidermist who was the first director of the Bronx Zoo
- Martha Maxwell (1831–1881), American naturalist, taxidermist, and artist who was the first female naturalist to obtain and taxidermy her own specimens
- Charles Johnson Maynard (1845–1929), American naturalist, ornithologist, and taxidermist who discovered many new species and authored many notable publications
- Charles Willson Peale (1741–1827), American painter, Revolutionary War veteran, inventor, naturalist, and polymath who organized the first U.S. scientific expedition in 1801
- Hermann Ploucquet (1816–1878), German naturalist and taxidermist best known for his works of anthropomorphic taxidermy
- Walter Potter (1835–1918), Victorian era British creator of iconic whimsical anthropomorphic taxidermy dioramas
- Jules Verreaux (1807–1873), French botanist, ornithologist, and taxidermy collector and trader
- James Rowland Ward (1848–1912), British taxidermist and founder of Rowland Ward Limited, known for its furniture and household items made of animal parts
- Carl Cotton (1918–1971), the first African American taxidermist at the Field Museum

== See also ==
- Bird collections
- Conservation and restoration of taxidermy
- Dermestarium
- Deyrolle, internationally known purveyor of taxidermy located Paris
- Green hunting
- Negro of Banyoles, example of a taxidermied human
- Julia Pastrana, a sideshow performer preserved via taxidermy
- Plastination
- Skinning
- Skull mounts
- Taxidermy art and science
