= August Friedrich Bök =

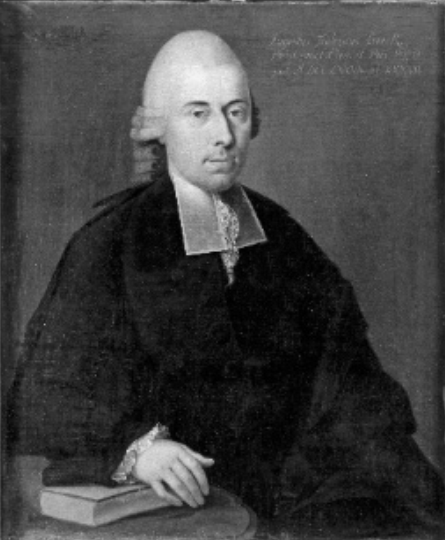
- Born: December 6, 1739; Stuttgart, Germany
- Died: August 21, 1815 (aged 75); Tübingen, Germany

August Friedrich Bök (December 6, 1739 – August 21, 1815) was a German philosopher at the University of Tübingen. He was influenced by Gottfried Ploucquet. His son-in-law was Johann Heinrich Ferdinand Autenrieth. He was a colleague of Jacob Friedrich von Abel, and taught G. W. F. Hegel and Friedrich Hölderlin.
