= Jean-Baptiste Bécœur =

French ornithologist (1718–1777)

Jean-Baptiste Bécœur (16 April 1718, Metz, France – 16 September 1777) was a French ornithologist.

Bécœur's parents were well-placed. His father, François Bécœur, was an apothecary, his mother, Anne Vaucremont, was the daughter of a doctor. He studied pharmacy first with his father and then in Germany, and finally in Paris where he attended the courses of Antoine de Jussieu. He then returned to Metz.

He was initially interested in philosophy and mathematics, but then devoted himself to natural history, studying mainly insects and birds. At this time, conservation techniques were mediocre. Bécoeur developed a method that preserved bird specimens and prevented them from being damaged by insect attack. He sent birds thus prepared to the Jardin du Roi, later to become the Muséum national d'Histoire naturelle, which earned him the praises of naturalist Georges-Louis Buffon and helped revolutionize the conservation of birds and ornithology at the museum. He tried several times, without success, to become an assistant at the museum.

His method of conservation was based on arsenic, but he died without publishing the recipe for his arsenical soap. It appeared again early in the 19th century in publications by Daudin and Dufresne, who were connected with the Muséum d'Histoire Naturelle in Paris. Bécoeur's secret had been handed over to François Levaillant (1753–1828), who sold the recipe together with his collection of animals and plants to the French government in 1797. The arsenical soap remained in widespread usage until the 1950s.

Bécoeur was an associate of François Levaillant, who played a significant role in the establishment of French ornithology. Bécoeur's huge collection was purchased by the Charles II August, Duke of Zweibrücken for the cabinet of curiosities of the Château de Karlsberg, destroyed after the Siege of Mainz in 1793, during the First French Revolutionary War.
