= Marco Almera =

Southern California artist

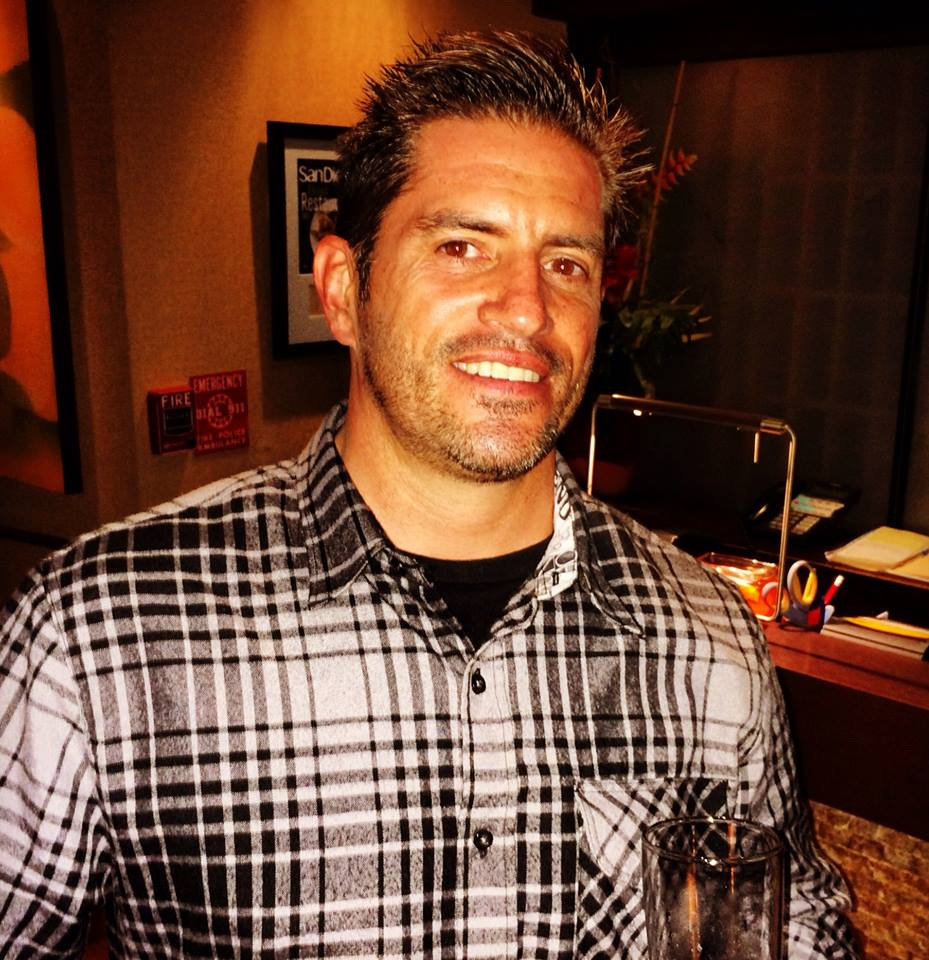
- Citizenship: American
- Occupation: Artist

Marco Almera is a Southern California artist.

== Biography ==
Growing up in Orange County, Marco Almera's artistic career emerged from the Southern California surfing, skateboarding and rock 'n' roll subculture of the late 1980s. A Southern California native, Almera was inspired by the do-it-yourself style of this subculture, and began by creating his own graphics and fine art. The artist has many influences and references that show up in his work: the surfing and beach subculture, skateboarding, rock 'n' roll and underground music; the iconic "California Girl", hot rods, iconography and the timeless coastal lifestyle.

Having studied at University of California, Santa Cruz, Almera has spent his career working independently creating t-shirt designs, album covers, rock music posters, commercial graphics and commissioned paintings. Over the years, his art and hand-printed serigraphs have been in Japan, Germany, England, The Netherlands and all over the United States.

== Exhibitions and collections ==
The artist began showing his fine art in galleries in 1999, and has since participated in many solo and group shows, mostly on the West Coast. Galleries that have shown his work include The Copro Gallery and La Luz de Jesus Gallery in Los Angeles, The Laguna Beach Art Museum, the Track 16 Gallery Santa in Monica, 111 Minna Gallery and the Shooting Gallery in San Francisco, the Huntington Beach Surf Museum, the Huntington Beach Art Museum, the Santa Barbara Maritime Museum, the Art Institute of California San Diego and Roq La Rue Gallery in Seattle. In 2000, 2001 and 2002 the artist had a series of gallery and local art shows in Antwerp, London, Hamburg, Berlin, Munich, Frankfurt and Amsterdam. Recently, Almera's black velvet paintings of several rock 'n' roll artists have become featured in Alex's Bar, a dive bar and music club in Long Beach, California.

== Media coverage ==
The artist has been interviewed and featured in several art and surfing magazines in the U.S., Europe and Japan; most notably, Surfer Magazine, Skateboarding (Germany), and Juxtapoz Magazine. He has also been interviewed and featured in a few hardcover books. The Art of Modern Rock, published in 2004, included both an interview and a series of Almera's rock posters. The artist also had some of his rock posters included in the book Rockin' Down the Highway, by the same author, Paul Grushkin. Kustom Graphics 2, following up the book Kustom Graphics, published by Korero Books, also features Almera and showcases some of his newer work. In 2011, the artist was included in La Luz de Jesus Gallery's 25th Anniversary Group Show and the accompanying hardcover book, as well as Surf Graphics, released by Korero Books (U.K.) in 2012. Almera's art has also been featured in numerous television and cinema productions. ABC's Wife Swap, the 2013 movie Old School, and the Robert Rodriguez and Quentin Tarantino films Grindhouse and Machete have all cleared and used Almera originals, serigraphs and lithographs for set dressings. In Summer 2012, the Robert Rodriguez production studio again contacted the artist and cleared 7 additional pieces to be used in their production, Machete Kills. That same year, three Almera rock posters were used as set dressing in a political promotion video featuring Samuel L. Jackson.

The 2017 movie The Long Way Back: the story of Sublime and Todd Zalkins, included the artist's Long Beach Dub Allstars rock poster as set dressing.

Almera lists Metallica frontman James Hetfield and comedian David Cross among his collectors.

Most recently, Almera has been included in Robb Havassy’s Surf Story Volume 2, as well as the Rockabilly/Psychobilly Anthology published by Schiffer Publishing.

On January 5, 2022, Almera was arrested for threatening death or great bodily injury upon another. He is currently serving a 2 year prison sentence. https://apps.sdsheriff.net/wij/wijDetail.aspx?BookNum=R1UipTT6%2fmgdmUGkhXdugUQCFOzcLHveVc8KfbF13Dw%3d
