= Bird collections =

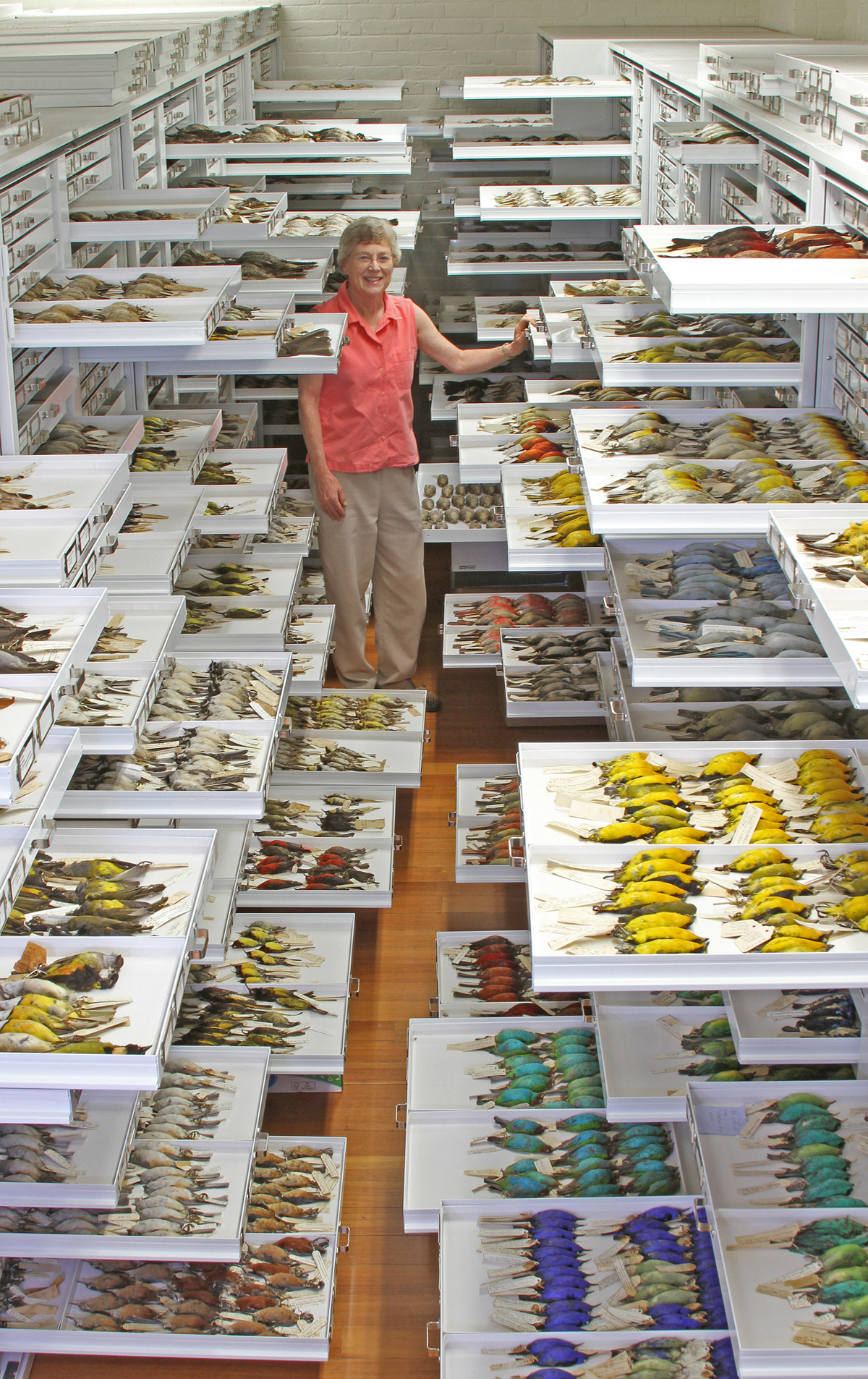
Cabinets at the Museum of Comparative Zoology, Harvard University

Bird collections are curated repositories of scientific specimens consisting of birds and their parts. They are a research resource for ornithology, the science of birds, and for other scientific disciplines in which information about birds is useful. These collections are archives of avian diversity and serve the diverse needs of scientific researchers, artists, and educators. Collections may include a variety of preparation types emphasizing preservation of feathers, skeletons, soft tissues, or (increasingly) some combination thereof. Modern collections range in size from small teaching collections, such as one might find at a nature reserve visitor center or small college, to large research collections of the world's major natural history museums, the largest of which contain hundreds of thousands of specimens. Bird collections function much like libraries, with specimens arranged in drawers and cabinets in taxonomic order, curated by scientists who oversee the maintenance, use, and growth of collections and make them available for study through visits or loans.

== History of bird collections ==
=== Origin ===
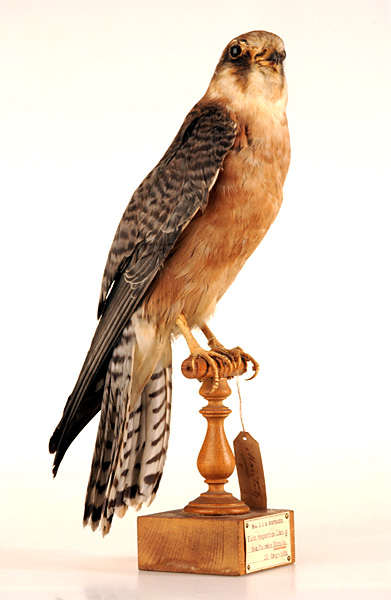
Early collection used lifelike mounts like this red-footed falcon.

The roots of modern bird collections are found in the 18th- and 19th-century explorations of Europeans intent on documenting global plant and animal diversity. It was a fashion to collect and display natural curiosities in Victorian England. Some wealthy cabinet naturalists were able to amass large collections using networks of field collectors. These early collections were not intended for scientific study and the collectors gave importance to aesthetics rather than scientific value. It grew into a more scientific pursuit much later.

=== Growth ===
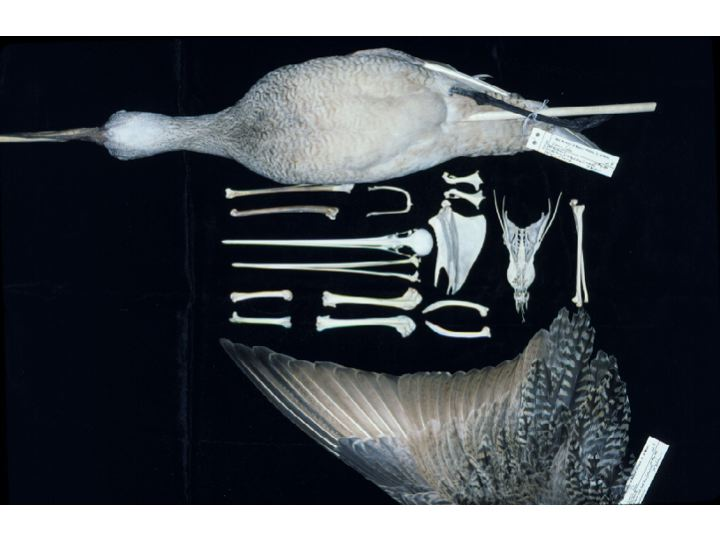
Marbled godwit, Limosa fedoa, prepared as a skin (shmoo), skeleton, and spread wing

Early scientific bird collections included those belonging to Pallas and Naumann in Germany, Latham and Tunstall in England and Adanson in France. Collections grew in size with increasing maritime activity, exploration and colonialism. For example, Charles Darwin collected over 400 bird specimens during his travels on the Beagle, and it was many years after his return to England that his bird collections from the Galapagos inspired (in part) his theory of evolution through natural selection. The Paris museum had 463 bird specimens in 1793 and this grew to 3411 in 1809; the Berlin museum had 2000 specimens in 1813 growing to 13,760 around 1850. In 1753 there were 1172 bird specimens in the museum established by Sir Hans Sloane but these appear to have perished before they moved to the British Museum. Early specimens from Captain Cook's voyages as well as those described by Latham in his General Synopsis of Birds (1781–1785) were also lost possibly due to poor preservation techniques. The scale of collections grew to the point where they needed more space and full-time curators. In the earliest days of ornithology, collecting was the dominant method of bird observation and study. This approach has diminished with the growth of the discipline. The use of mist-netting and photography, blood sampling (for DNA, immunological and other studies), the development of optics and the use of other new techniques for studying birds have reduced the need to collect specimens for research, yet collections continue to act as a vital shared resource for science (particularly taxonomy) and conservation. In an era of mass extinction, bird collections will evidence lost species.

== Collection and preservation techniques ==
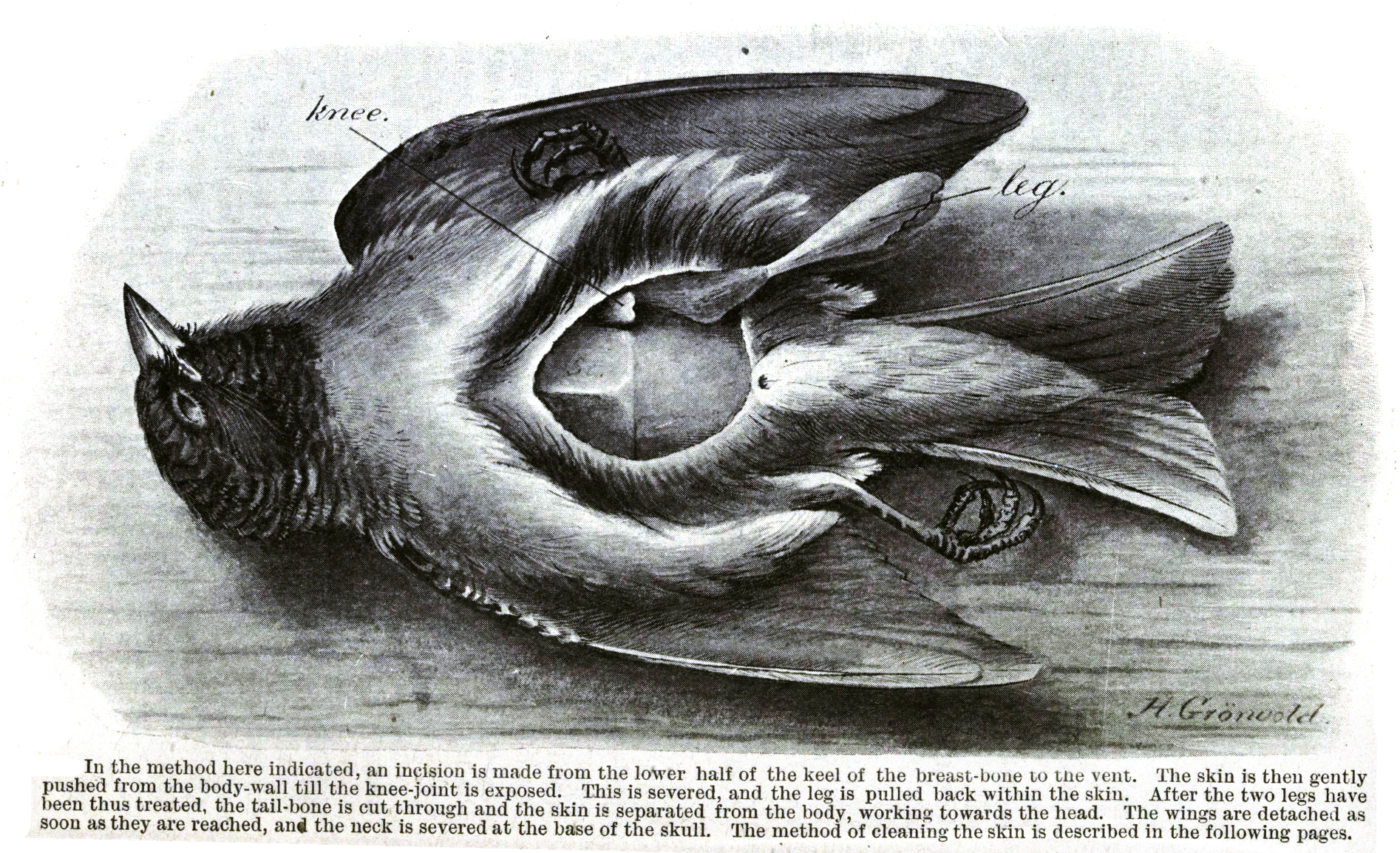
Skinning a bird

Early specimens represent birds that were pets or came from menageries. The oldest surviving bird specimens include an African grey parrot once owned by Frances Teresa Stuart (1647–1702) that was buried with its owner in London’s Westminster Abbey. Several mummified ibis and falcons have been recorded from Egyptian tombs dating from 600 to 300 BC. Bird specimens obtained from the 18th century for natural history collections were most often obtained using firearms. Shotguns with "dust" shot were preferred to reduce damage to the specimens. Today, specimens come from a variety of sources. Many (perhaps most) are salvaged from birds killed by window and communications tower strikes, domestic cats, by-catch from fisheries, die-offs from disease, vehicle strikes, and other accidental sources of mortality. However, the world's bird collections have been argued to be inadequate in documenting avian diversity, from taxonomic, geographic, and temporal perspectives, with some parts of tropical regions considered under-represented in particular museums. Underrepresented taxa continue to be actively collected by ornithologists, generally using either firearms or mist-nets. Permitting agencies oversee these activities in most countries.

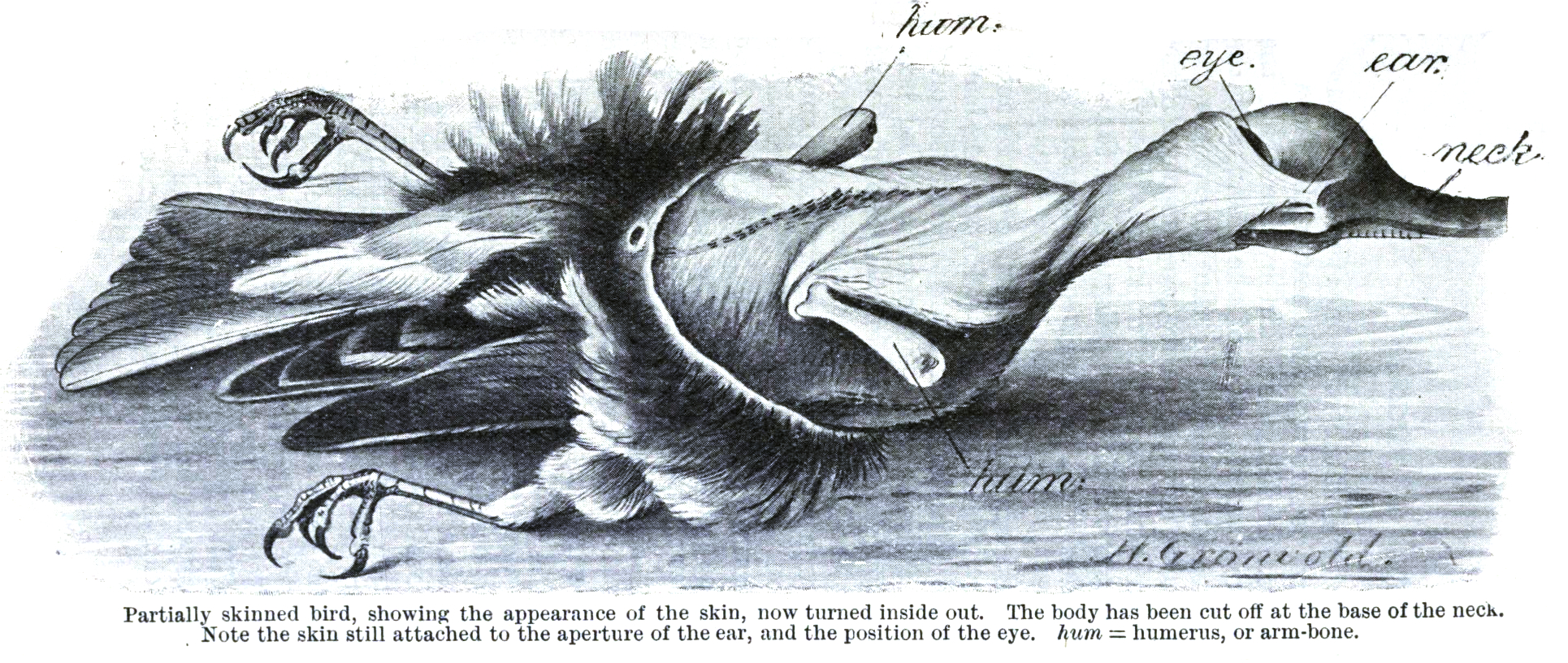
A partly skinned bird

Techniques to preserve birds were attempted even from the early 16th century as shown in the writings of Conrad Gesner and Pierre Belon. Belon provided instructions on the removal of viscera and the use of salt to preserve bird specimens in his 1555 book on birds. These were further improved in the 17th century and a range of preservatives included ash (potassium carbonate), salt, sulphur, alum, alcohol and various plant extracts were used. In the early days of bird collections, most specimens were mounted in unrealistic positions often with their wings raised as if they were about to take flight. These were kept in the open and the colours were prone to fading and the specimens themselves prone to damage by beetles. In Berlin, J. L. Frisch started using tightly enclosed glass jars for every mount to prevent pest damage. During this time, Comte de Reaumur at the Paris Museum had managed to find techniques to preserve specimens dry and without loss of colour. This technique was however a secret and similar results were later achieved by pickling using salt, ground pepper and alum and drying for a month with threads holding the bird in a natural position. The use of arsenic to preserve specimens was first introduced by Jean-Baptiste Bécoeur (1718-1777) but this method was publicly revealed only in 1800 by Louis Dufresne in Daudin's Traité Élémentaire et Complet d’Ornithologie (1800). In modern collections, salvaged or collected birds may be preserved in a number of ways. The most traditional preparation is a study skin, in which almost all of the body inside the skin is removed and replaced with cotton so that the final result resembles a bird lying on its back with its wings folded. Borax is used as the preferred preservative as it is low in toxicity. This stereotypic posture was developed to enable many skins to be kept together in cabinets to protect them from insect and light damage. If a complete skeleton is desired, a flat skin may be prepared: all bones, muscle, digestive and other soft tissue is carefully removed and the feathers and skin are stretched flat and dried.

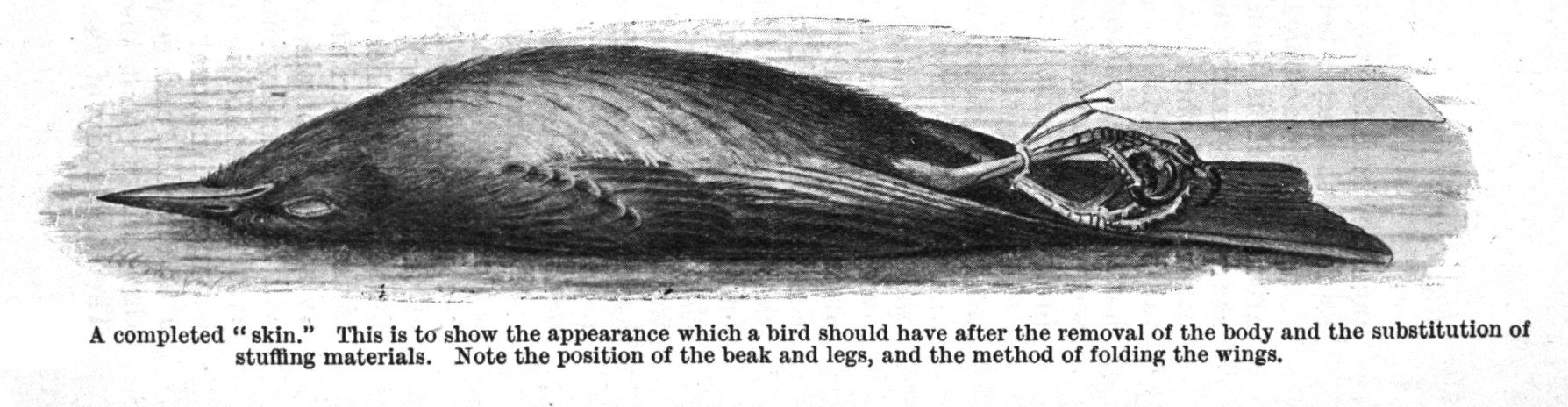
A prepared skin

A more recent preparation method pioneered by the Royal Ontario Museum removes all bones for a complete skeleton while also producing a round skin without bill or legs (called a ROM, though if one set of wing and leg bones remain with the skin the preparation is called a shmoo in North America). Alternatively, the entire bird (or any soft parts associated with preparations described above) may be preserved in alcohol. For any of these methods, several supplemental preparations may be made. For example, a wing may be removed and preserved separately as a spread wing for better study of flight feathers; a tissue sample may be removed and frozen for molecular analyses; or a recording of the bird's song before collection may be archived. Neither molecular samples nor sound recordings require a bird to be collected (killed). Finally, if the bird is too rotten for the skin and feathers to be preserved, as is the case with some salvaged specimens, the skeleton alone may be preserved. Dried tissue is removed from skeletons by using dermestid beetle larvae (genus Dermestes). Whereas in the past arsenic was routinely added to skins to protect them from destruction by insects, specimens prepared today are generally protected by an initial freezing period to kill insects and their eggs followed by keeping them in high-quality museum cases in a climate-controlled room. Each specimen has data associated with it, and the amount of data available is usually directly correlated with the specimen's scientific value. Most specimens are of little value for research without accompanying information, such as the time and place the bird was found or collected. This and other important information, such as mass, sex, fat deposition, and degree of skull ossification, is written on a label along with a unique field and museum number. Modern computerized museum databases include all of this information for each specimen, as well as the types of methods used to prepare the bird. Modern collections seek to maximize the utility of each preserved individual, and this includes recording detailed information about it. Most modern specimens also include a tissue sample preserved for genetic study. Online access to collections' data is becoming increasingly available, and a cross-institutional database covering millions of computerized bird records is in development. Freeze drying of whole specimens, especially of small birds, has been adopted for use in teaching collections.

== Uses of bird collections ==
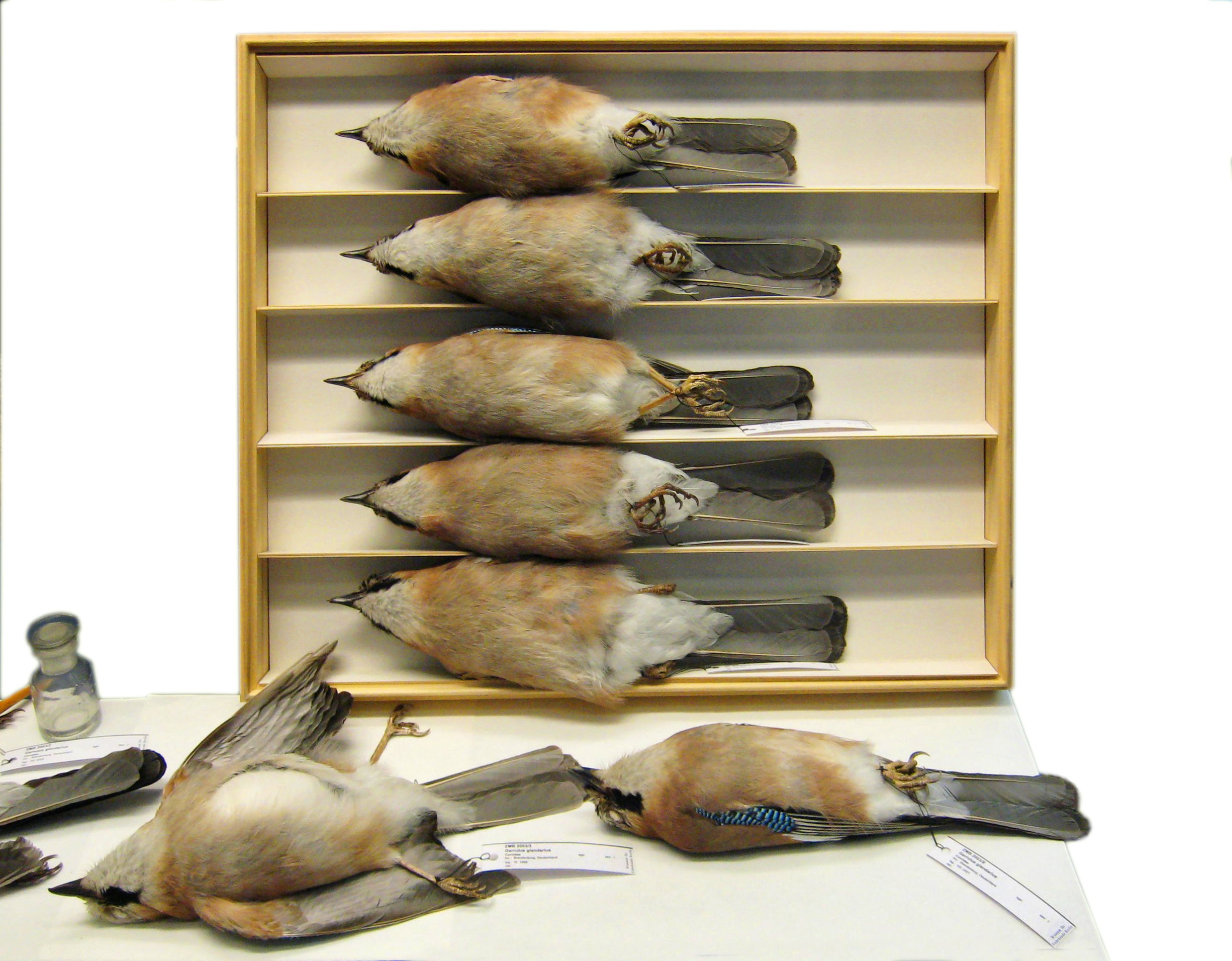
Study skins of Garrulus glandarius in Museum für Naturkunde, Berlin

Bird collections are used for a wide variety of purposes. All biological species including those of birds are represented by a holotype, the vast majority of which are full specimens (mostly skins) and in modern times explicitly designated in the original description of the taxon. All other putative members of the species may be compared to the holotype to confirm their identification. Rigorous studies of avian taxonomy are based on specimens from bird collections. Taxonomic studies rely on morphological and genetic characters to determine species limits and evolutionary relationships. Museum specimens have been the preferred source for scoring these characteristics, as they allow studies to be replicated – anyone may go back and repeat the study using the same specimens to verify the conclusions. However, it has alternatively been argued that such re-examination can be undertaken from archived photographs without killing the study piece.

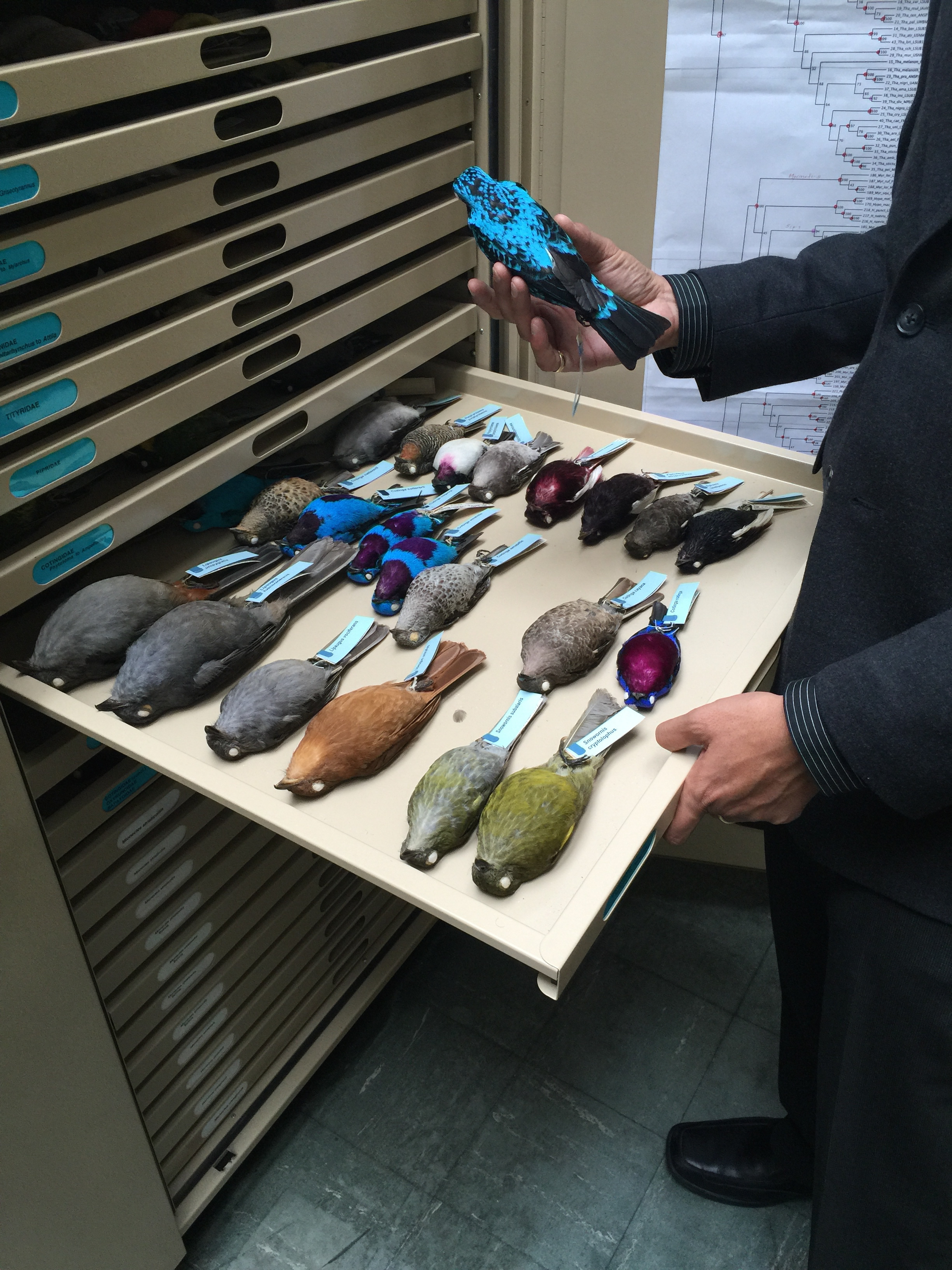
Cabinet with study skins, Louisiana State University

In the case of molecular studies, the preservation of a specimen that can vouch for the source of the tissue sample used to gather genetic data has been recommended, as genetic analysis often yields surprising results that make reexamination of the original specimen crucial.

Studies on ectoparasites, usually obtained during capture, but also obtained from old museum specimens, are valuable for studies on coevolution and zoonoses.

In addition to taxonomic research, collections can provide information relevant to the study of variety of other ornithological questions, including comparative anatomy, ecology, behavior, disease, and conservation. Forensic ornithologists use collections to identify species involved in aircraft bird strikes, imported materials containing bird parts, and birds killed through various human activities, legal and illegal. In addition, collections are used by zooarchaeologists to identify bird bones at prehistoric human sites or species of origin for feathers used in human cultural artifacts. Collections also have been heavily used by artists, particularly for the production of plates for ornithological field guides. The close-up observation and opportunity for manipulation provided by preserved study skins makes them, together with field observations and photography, to be an important basis for painters of field guide plates of birds. Most bird species have several unique plumages that distinguish immature from adults, males from females, and breeders from non-breeders. Thus, many different specimens may be required to produce a thorough plate for identification of a given species. Accurate colour measurements using spectrometry are possible from specimens. For seabirds, museum specimens are adequate proxies for feather colour but not for skin colour.

Bird collections have been useful for retrospective studies. Bird collections offer the potential for current and future researchers to make in-depth morphological and molecular study of past avian diversity. One of the earliest and most famous examples of this was the use of egg collections from the 19th and early 20th centuries in determining that the pesticide DDT was producing eggshell-thinning in raptors. The ornithologists who collected the eggs could never have known that their work would one day help establish causes for declines and help in making conservation strategies to save bird such as peregrine falcons from possible extinction.

As threats to bird populations grow and extinctions continue, historical specimens are valuable in documenting the impacts of human activities and causes of decline for threatened species. Bird collections have also been used to gauge the flow of environmental pollutants over time. A study of soot deposits on specimens collected within the United States Manufacturing Belt was used to track concentrations of atmospheric black carbon over a 135-year span. Other possible uses for bird specimens not known today may arise in the future.

== Collection debates ==
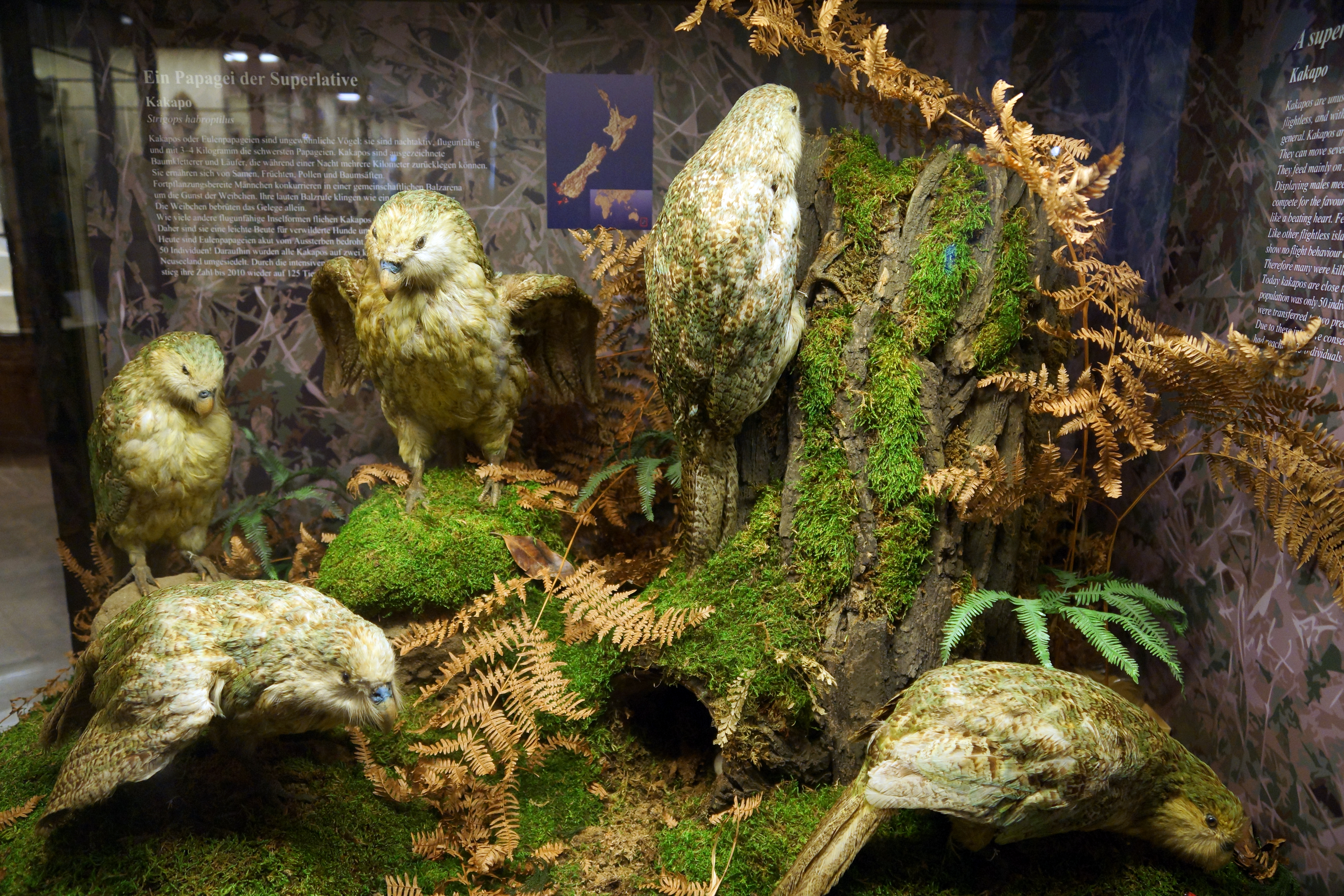
Specimens of the endangered kākāpō at the Vienna Museum of Natural History; thousands of kākāpō were collected for museums across the world

The issue of whether birds should continue to be actively collected for research has been the subject of some debate among ornithologists (examples of this can be found in the lively exchanges between Remsen and Bekoff & Elzanowski, between Vuilleumier and Donegan, and between Dubois & Nemesio and Donegan). Those opposed to collecting believe that much of current collecting is unnecessary, arguably motivated by the personal field scores of individuals or by competition between museums, rather than the result of a strict scientific rationale; that collecting, in extreme cases of species on the verge of extinction, can pose a threat to bird populations; and that in many cases in which the necessity of specimens is claimed, new technology such as digital photography and blood sample analysis of mist-netted individuals could instead be used. Finally, at a time of rampant deforestation and species extinctions, scientists and conservationists should take the lead in providing an example to local people not to kill or hunt birds. Where other techniques not involving killing of a bird are feasible, to take a specimen is viewed by some as simply unethical. Proponents of collecting counter-argue that compared to the many millions of birds killed each year by habitat destruction, domestic cats, window strikes, and tower kills, scientists collect only a few thousand birds per year worldwide and populations will quickly recover from an episode of collecting as long as their habitat remains. Supporters of continued collecting also point to the greater scientific utility and legacy of museum specimens compared to blood samples or photographs, and argue that collecting for research offers the only source of avian mortality with a positive outcome for birds in terms of the biological knowledge gained. Although taking small blood samples from wild birds is often viewed as a harmless alternative to collecting, it reduces survival by as much as 33% and does not provide the benefits of a voucher specimen. Scientists have pointed out that bird populations represent renewable resources, and that scientific collecting represents only a tiny and non-additive proportion of annual bird mortality. However, examples exist of species whose extinction was directly contributed to by museum collecting (e.g. Guadalupe caracara, ivory-billed woodpecker). The last bird of the extinct Black Mamo from Molokai was shot for collecting.
