= Taxidermy art and science =

There have been attempts to categorise taxidermy in both artistic and scientific terms for over a century. An 1896 review of Montagu Browne’s Artistic and Scientific Taxidermy and Modelling notes that “Any work which will aid in more clearly defining the difference between the art of taxidermy and the trade of taxidermy is to be welcomed.” Stephen T. Asma suggests that natural history museums are places where the art and science of taxidermy work in tandem. He writes, “natural history museums are inherently aesthetic representations of science in particular and conceptual ideas in general.” Asma also notes the taxidermy of Carl Ethan Akeley (1864-1926). Akeley’s work is known for merging the science and artistry of taxidermy through his “revolutionary action-pose techniques.” It is suggested that, “Akeley’s artistic powers were heightened by his firsthand studies of animal anatomy and animal behaviour.”

== Taxidermy and science ==
Taxidermy has contributed to the study of taxonomy. Sally Gregory Kohlstedt writes that as early as the nineteenth century, “natural history museums were the principal location for dialogues and exchange of specimens among those debating identification and connection among natural objects.” Traditional taxonomy primarily concerns "morphology." More recently, advances in, “genetic and other molecular studies,” has enabled scientists to explore techniques to extract genetic information from, “ancient and historical samples." These methods of extracting material from preserved animals provide genetic taxonomical information; genetic taxonomy seeks to, “[measure] the genetic distance between different species.”

Preserved specimens have also been used in the study of endangered and extinct species. A study conducted by Mireia Casas-Marce et al., is documented in the article “The Value of Hidden Scientific Resources: Preserved Animal Specimens from Private Collections and Small Museums.” In this study, the acquisition of extinct or rare specimens from private taxidermy collections, as well as from collections present in natural history museums are seen as important sources to the preservation of these uncommon animal materials. One technique used for the extraction of molecular and genetic material from taxidermy specimens is, “invasive sampling.” Casas-Marce, et al., regard the study of taxidermy specimens as one method, “to better understand how species change over time and, in the face of global change, how they cope with the decline and fragmentation of their populations and habitats.”

== Taxidermy and art ==
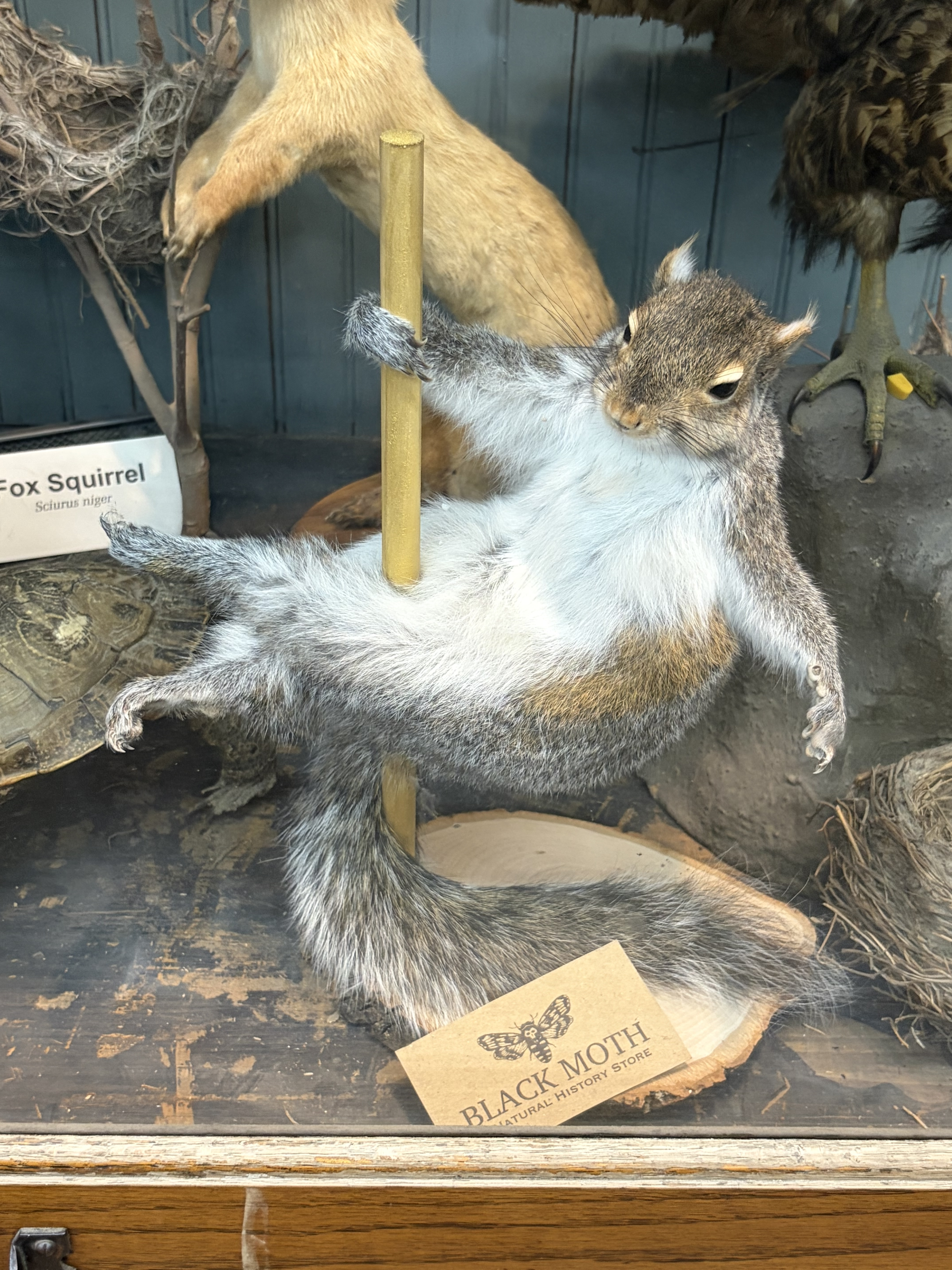
Taxidermied squirrel “pole dancing” at the St. Louis City Museum

For private practice or on public display, taxidermy is considered an art. Like other arts, taxidermists try to achieve, "artistic authenticity." In taxidermy, this is done through representing the animal to look as natural, real, or "alive" as possible. In another contemporary review of Montagu Browne’s Artistic and Scientific Taxidermy and Modelling, F.A. Lucas suggests that the artistic integrity of the taxidermist relies, "not so much on the mechanical devices employed as on the artistic eye and skilled hand of the workman." Lucas recommends using artificial materials in order to present the specimen as a representation that is true to nature:

"Now it is recognized that at least one of the objects of a public museum is to give the public glimpses of living creatures as they really appear, and it is admitted that it is better to replace such appendages as combs and wattles, or even to obscure the scales of a bird's foot with paint, than to show the public dried, distorted and dingy effigies."

Taxidermy or elements of taxidermy are also used in branches of bio art.

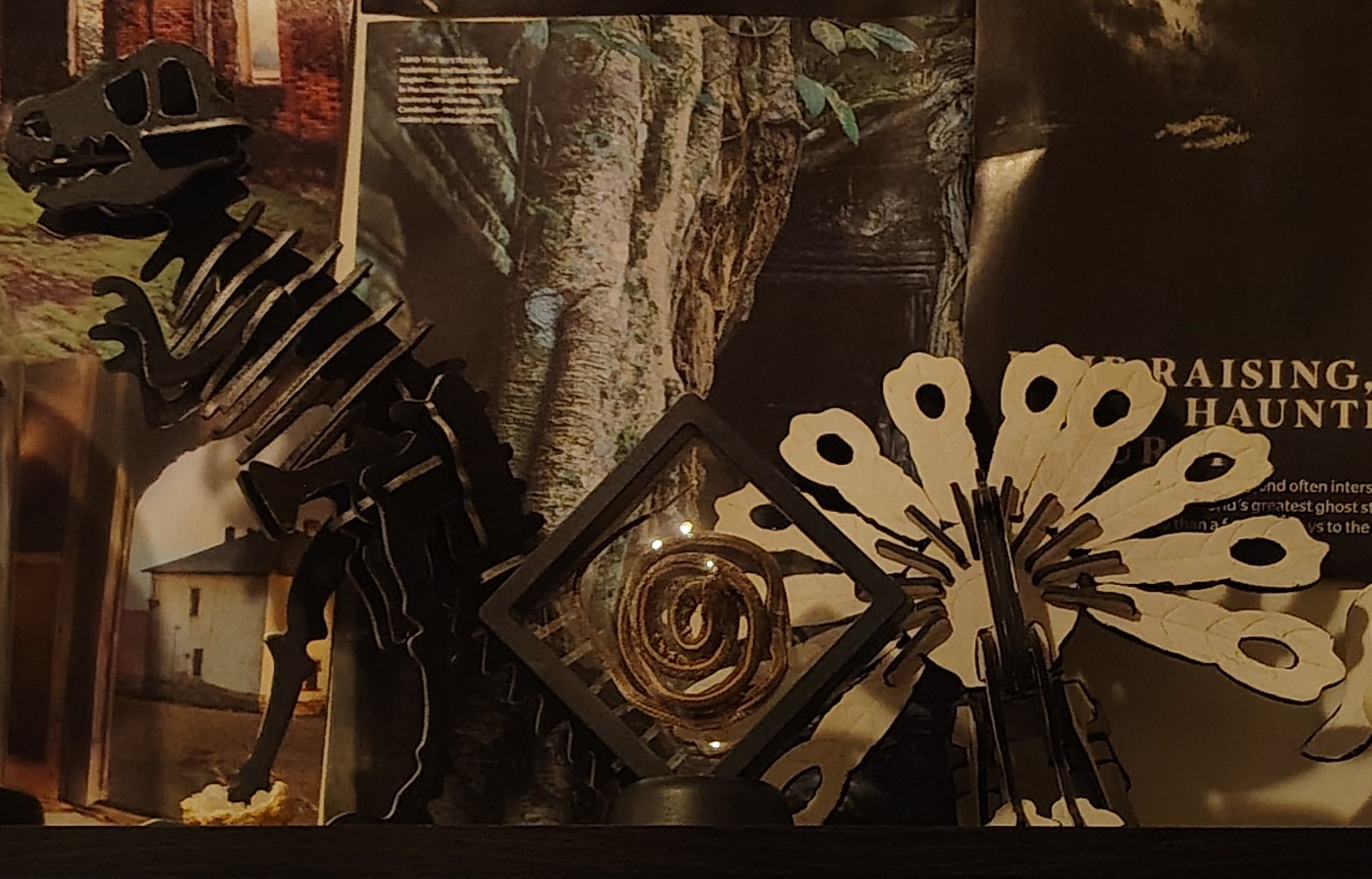
Taxidermy Garter Snake use as personal decoration

Whole preserved animals or parts of animals, such as their skins, are sometimes used in this art. Bio art and traditional taxidermy can be seen as being in conflict based on artistic philosophies of authenticity and the purpose behind representation. Rikke Hansen writes, "Bio art does not simply break with notions of representation, but instead actively critiques practices of representation as they take place within science and cultural life." Her article "Animal Skins in Contemporary Art" suggests that, "Traditional taxidermy pushes forward the belief that animals are their skin." Hansen discusses the nature of human and animal subjectivity through taxidermy practices, using Bryndis Snaebjörnsdottir and Mark Wilson’s nanoq: flat out and bluesome (2004) as an example. Hansen describes the preserved polar bears of Snaebjörnsdottir and Wilson as, "mak[ing] explicit the way in which animal life is 'serialized' through the use and display of the 'specimen'."
