= Sarina Brewer =

American artist (born 1970)

- Born: 1970 (age 55–56); Minneapolis, Minnesota, U.S.
- Education: Minneapolis College of Art and Design
- Known for: Taxidermy sculpture
- Movement: Rogue taxidermy
- Website: sarina-brewer.com

Sarina Brewer is a Minneapolis-based American artist known for her avant-garde taxidermy sculpture and her role in the popularization of taxidermy-related contemporary art. Brewer is one of the individuals responsible for the formation of the genre of Rogue Taxidermy, a variety of mixed media art. A primary directive throughout her career has been the use of ethically procured animal materials.

== Early life ==
Brewer was born in 1970. Brewer's parents, also artists, raised her in an environment centered around wildlife and family pets. Her art arose from an interest in biology and nature. She studied at the Minneapolis College of Art and Design (MCAD), earning a Bachelor of Fine Arts degree in 1993. During her formative years at MCAD, she worked primarily with found objects, most of which were mummified animal remains. Her early works were shrines to the animals they incorporated and often involved the gold leafing of animal mummies, a technique still utilized in her current body of work. Her work with the remains of animals evolved into taxidermy over the years, and she is self-taught in this realm. She states her work is an extension of her childhood belief in reincarnation and that her taxidermy sculptures serve as symbolic bodies for transmigrating animal spirits. She describes the art she has created throughout her career as an hommage to the animals she uses. Brewer is a conservationist and former wildlife rehabilitator who volunteered in the biology department at the Science Museum of Minnesota for over a decade.

== Career ==
To form her own movement and break off from conventional taxidermy and its traditions, Brewer and two colleagues coined the term Rogue Taxidermy. In 2004, Brewer and two fellow Minneapolis artists established The Minnesota Association of Rogue Taxidermists (MART), an international collective of artists who use taxidermy-related materials (both organic and synthetic) as the common thread to unite their respective styles of mixed-media sculpture. The work of Brewer and the other founders of MART dramatically changed the way taxidermy materials are used. The pioneering work of Brewer and her fellow co-founders gained worldwide attention in 2005 after they appeared on the front page of the New York Times art section following their inaugural gallery exhibition. The article featured Brewer's taxidermy sculpture titled Goth Griffin. Positive response from other artists following the exhibition led to the formation of the collective. Public interest in the genre gave rise to an art movement. Taxidermy art (a term used interchangeably with Rogue Taxidermy) is a trend that started in Minnesota with the work of Brewer and fellow MART co-founders and now has an international following. An influx of people working within the genre has led to a taxidermy revival in recent years.

Brewer maintains an ethical stance against traditional taxidermy culture. She does not kill animals for the purpose of creating art and she is noted as a trendsetter in this arena. Her work is made from recycled animal components salvaged from ethical sources such as natural deaths and road kill. She brought this policy with her when she helped construct MART. Brewer and her fellow co-founders incorporated this precept into the group's ethics charter, to which members of the collective were required to adhere. MART's "no-harm-no-waste" approach was one of the genre's founding elements; further, the use of ethically sourced materials has since become a tenet associated with the art movement, and broadened the art form to appeal to people who previously opposed taxidermy for moral reasons.

Brewer is regarded as an influential figure within the genre which has been noted for being largely female-driven, and she is acknowledged for playing a role in the shaping of it aesthetically as well as ethically. She has exhibited across the United States and has received international recognition. Her work has been included in Midwestern, West Coast, East Coast, and European venues. Among notable venues are the Los Angeles Art Show and The Natural History Museum of Geneva.

== Selected exhibitions ==
- 2016 The L.A. Art Show (Los Angeles Art Show), Los Angeles Convention Center, Los Angeles CA
- 2015 Myths & Legends, Lancaster Museum of Art and History (MOAH), Lancaster CA
- 2006 The Artists of Juxtapoz, Soo Visual Arts Center, Minneapolis MN
- 2006 Fabulous Sea Monsters, fr:Océanopolis, Brittany France
- 2004 Wunderkabinet of Ichthyological Curiosities, Natural History Museum of Geneva,

Unabridged exhibition list available on artist website

== Notable collections ==
- Natural History Museum of Geneva, Switzerland
- fr:Océanopolis Culture & Science Center, Brest France
- Mark Parker, Nike CEO. Nike World Headquarters, Portland, Oregon
- Guillermo del Toro, film producer and director. Los Angeles, California
- Richard Garriott, astronaut and digital gaming magnate. Britannia Manor, Austin, Texas

== See also ==
- Contemporary Art
- Rogue Taxidermy
- Polly Morgan (taxidermist)
- Angela Singer
- Lisa Black
- Kate Clark (artist)
- Mark Dion
- Julia deVille
