= Woollahra Small Sculpture Prize =

Australian art award

The Woollahra Small Sculpture Prize is an annual acquisitive award for small sculpture, organised by the Woollahra Council in New South Wales, Australia. It is recognised as Australia's leading small-scale sculpture competition with a prize pool of over A$29,000. In 2024 the prize attracted over 750 submissions from Australian and international artists.

The Woollahra Small Sculpture Prize was established in 2001 and is open to any freestanding sculptural work up to 80 cm in any direction. The major award earns a place in the Woollahra Council’s permanent public art collection.

The prize consists of the main Woollahra Small Sculpture Prize valued at $25,000, the non-acquisitive Special Commendation award of $2,000, Mayor's Award of $1,000 and the Viewers' Choice award of $1,000.

== Selected winners ==
- 2001 – Sebastian Di Mauro with Snare – Shimmer Suite
- 2002 – Jan King with Leda
- 2003 – Mikala Dwyer with Empty Sculpture
- 2004 – Bruce Slatter with Smashing
- 2005 – Jessie Cacchillo & Craig Waddell with Ruby Rabbit
- 2006 – Louis Pratt with The Ambassador’s Skull 3.1
- 2007 – Archie Moore with Humpy Goona
- 2008 – Adam Cullen with Pegasus flying over Sydney
- 2009 – Alexander Seton with I...U
- 2010 – Archie Moore with Humpy Goona
- 2011 – Margaret Seymour with Pas de deux
- 2012 – Thor Beowulf with The Carbon Credit Machine
- 2013 – Julia deVille with Sorrow
- 2014 – Natalie Guy with Form for modern living #2
- 2015 – Robert Owen with Symmetria #37’
- 2016 – Todd Robinson with Psychic Staircase
- 2017 – Sanné Mestrom with Self Portrait (Sleeping Muse)
- 2018 – Tim Silver with Untitled (When Lilacs Last in the Dooryard Bloom'd 02)
- 2019 – Merran Esson with Autumn On The Monaro
- 2021 – Rhonda Sharpe with Desert woman with mustache, coolamon and pretty clothes
- 2023 – Anita Johnson with Tenderness
- 2024 – Hannah Gartside with Bunnies in Love, Lust and Longing
- 2025 – Virginia Leonard for Glad that you are not here all the time – an urn for unwanted limbs and other things
- 2026 – Mark Booth Nascent State: (hot pink)
