= Kate Clark (artist) =

American sculptor

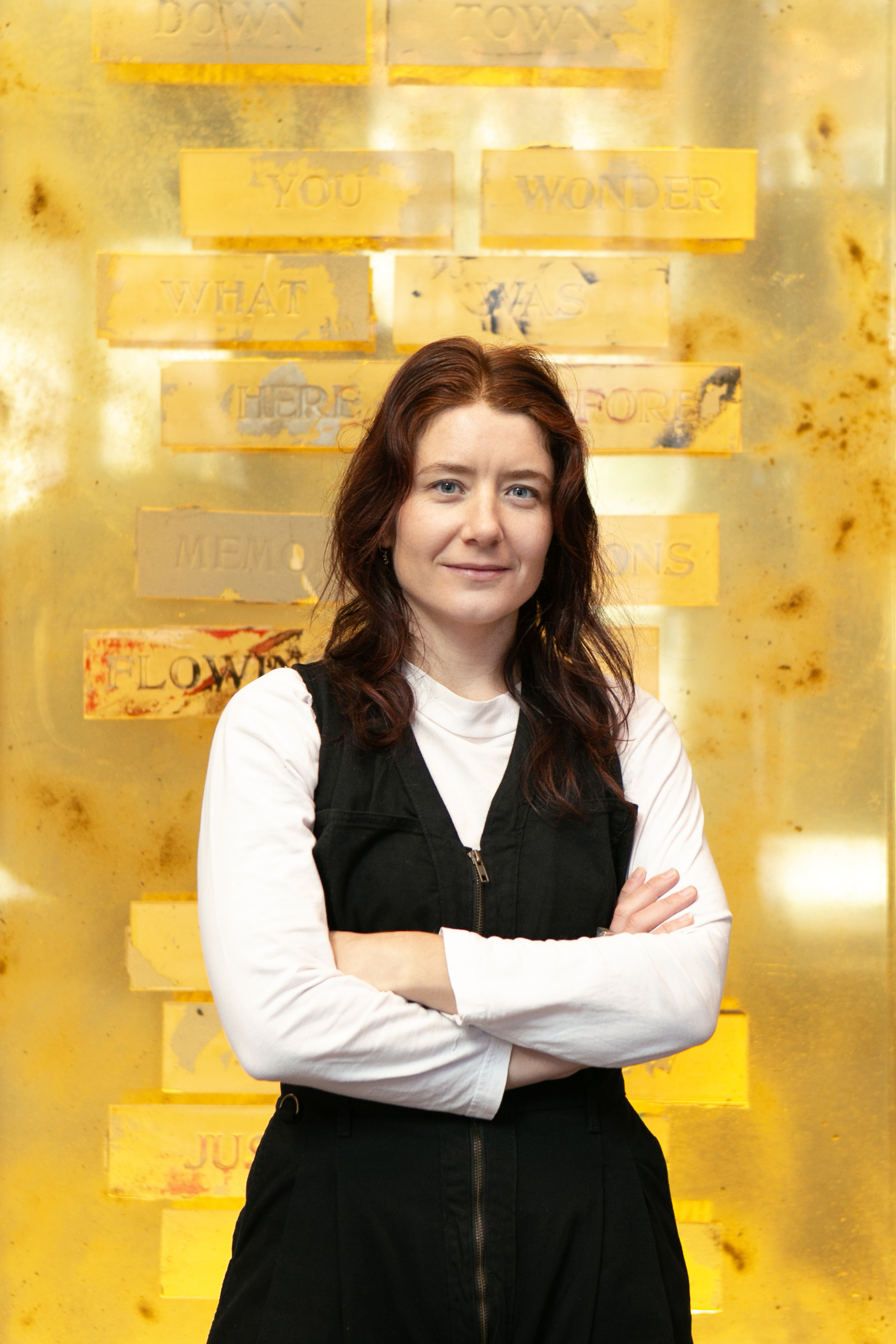
- Kate Clark at her installation, "What You Have Become" (Seattle Convention Center Summit Building, Seattle WA). Photo by Mel Kagerer, 2024
- Born: 1987 (age 38–39)
- Education: University of California San Diego, The Evergreen State College
- Website: www.kateclarkprojects.com

Kate Clark (born 1987) is an American artist who works across public art, studio art, and installation. Her public art has focused on the coexistence of life forms in locations such as tree trunks and city blocks through installations, experiential storytelling, urban studies, ethnography, and collaboration with communities including archaeologists and landscape designers. Her work explores the evolving interpretations of old objects and their meanings.

== Early life ==
Clark grew up in Anacortes, Washington. Through her parents receiving Fulbright Teaching grants as High School teachers, her family lived in Istanbul, Turkey in 1994-1995, and Brno, Czech Republic in 2003-2004, and was exposed to folklore and archaeological sites that informed her interest in local history and storytelling. While in Brno she studied at the Luzanky School of Art and the Studio Lavka photography studio.

== Education ==
Clark went to Evergreen State College for a BA in Studio Arts, studying abroad at The Pont Aven School of Contemporary Art, Pont Aven, France. After graduating in 2009, she studied with master ink painter Tousui Tanaka in Tokyo, Japan.

Clark went to the University of California, San Diego for a Masters of Fine Arts in Interdisciplinary Public Art, graduating in 2017, studying abroad for an "Urbanisms of Inclusion" fellowship at Università Iuav di Venezia in Italy, and at an urban design and architecture school at Bauhaus University, Weimar.

== Work ==
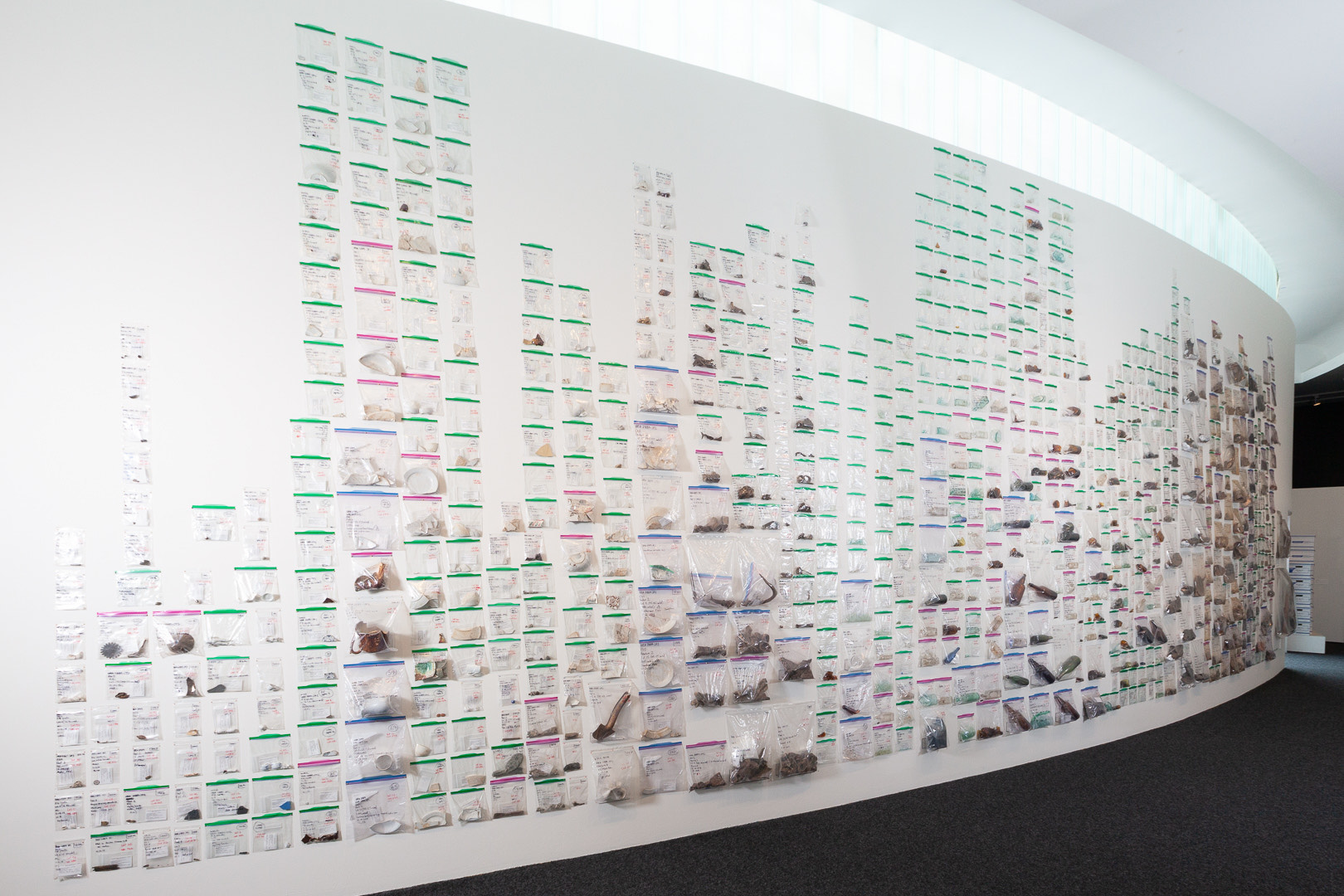
Kate Clark Artifact Wall at Bellevue Art Museum, Washington state, US, 2021, Photo by Jason Novak

Kate Clark’s art work has involved storytelling practices, research, and engagement with landscape design, archaeology, urban studies, and sculpture, with projects at the National Museum of Natural History of the Smithsonian Institution, the Bauhaus Institute Weimar, NgBK Berlin, The Oakland Museum of California, Bellevue Arts Museum, The Olympic Sculpture Park, and 4Culture.

The themes of Clark’s sculptures have included reinterpreting gender representations in art history, and the morphing of the female form in sculpture, such as the Venus of Willendorf and the Virgin Mary, and exploring feminized crafts and techniques, such as the Nordic countries tradition of rose painting or rosemaling.

=== Parkeology ===
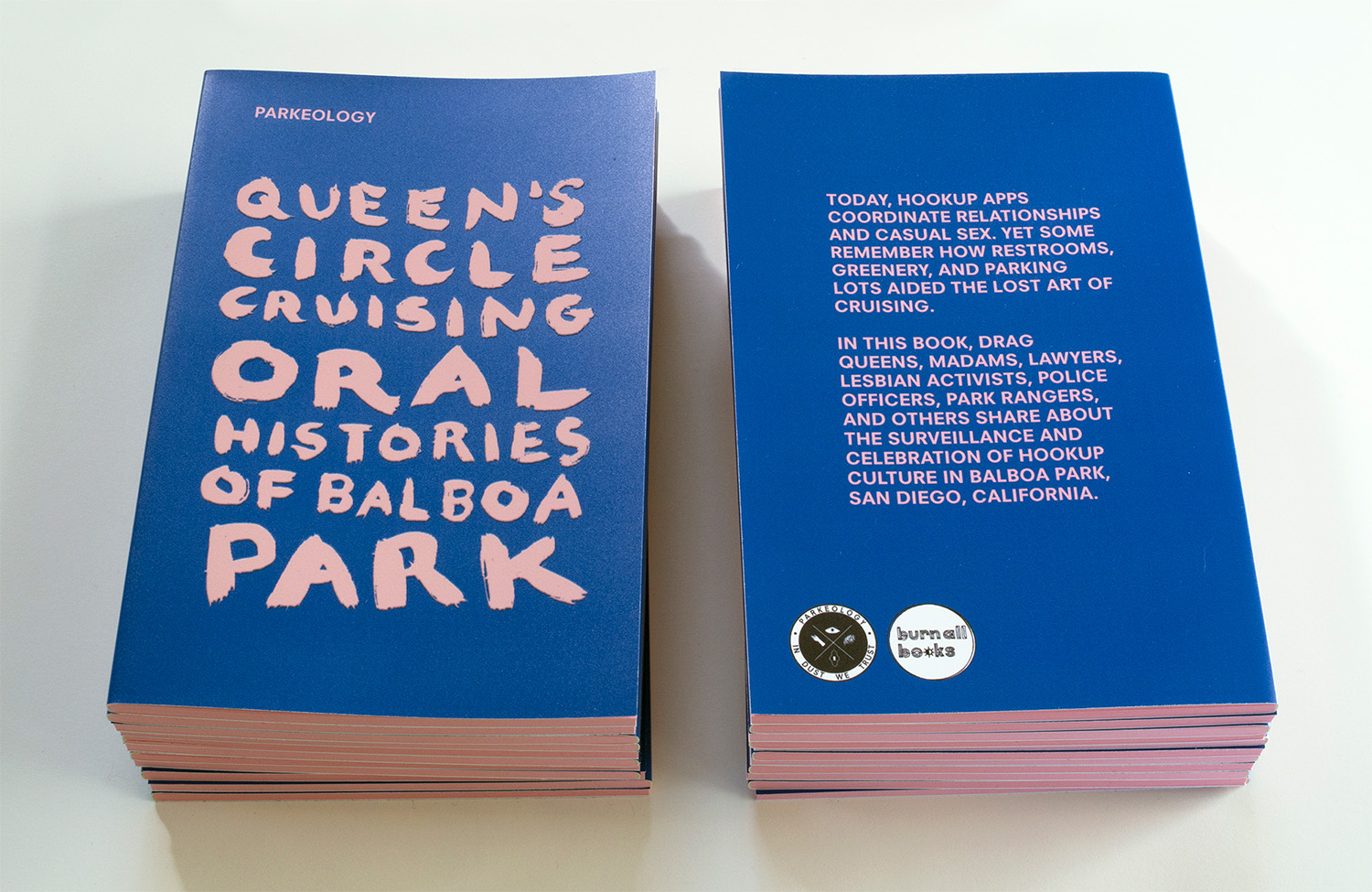
Photo of book Queen's Circle, developed for Queer California exhibition at the Oakland Museum of California. Design in collaboration with Marina Grize, printing by Burn All Books. Photo by Kate Clark, 2022

While Clark was working with the San Diego Art Institute, she organized “Parkeology,” collectively authored, community history projects and art installations at Balboa Park, "designed to uncover little-known aspects of the park’s places and institutions.”

- “Queens Circle,” an oral history project, book, and museum installation focused on LGBTQ+ cruising culture at Balboa Park.
- "Border Trolley Tours," a live storytelling tour between Balboa Park and the Mexico–United States border at San Ysidro and Tijuana, in collaboration with Cognate Collective and The Front Art e Cultura. The tour traced humans, animals, and materials that have migrated between San Diego, CA and Tijuana, MX.
- "Facing Artifacts," a live performance event at the San Diego Museum of Us that reinterpreted and interrogated the history of collecting live human face casts for anthropology research
- "Organ for the Senses," with San Diego Art Institute, a series of performances of commissioned original musical compositions for the Spreckels Organ Pavilion exploring the properties of the organ, 2017

=== Public Art and Planning ===
Clark is an art commissioner for the Seattle Design Commission, and served as a Community Engagement Artist in Residence for Seattle Public Utilities and the Seattle Office of Arts and Culture. From 2021-2024, she developed a ten year public art plan for the electricity utility Seattle City Light.

=== Teaching ===
Clark has taught at the University of San Diego, George Washington University, and The Anacortes Museum and guest lectured at University of Chicago, Bauhaus University, Weimar, Bellevue Arts Museum, and University of California, San Diego.

== Selected exhibitions ==
=== Solo shows ===
- "Cavity Creatures," Punch Gallery, Thorp, Washington, 2024
- "In Dust We Trust," San Diego Art Institute, San Diego, CA, 2016

=== Selected group shows ===
- “WILD LIFE,” Base Camp Studios II, Seattle WA, 2024
- “ReMix: Sculpture Park Tarot,” Seattle Art Museum, 2022
- “And We Will Sing in the Tall Grass Again,” The Front Art e Cultura, San Ysidra CA. 2022
- “Architecture & Urban Design Biennial,” Bellevue Arts Museum, Bellevue WA, 2021
- “Mira Mesa Community Art Week (with the AjA Project),” Mira Mesa, CA.
- “Working Title,” James by-the Sea Episcopal Church, La Jolla, CA, 2020
- “Queer California: Untold Stories,” Oakland Museum of California, Oakland, CA, 2019
- “Territorium,” Instituto Municipal de Arte y Cultura (IMAC), Tijuana, Mexico, 2019
- “A Show About Touching,” Bread & Salt and Art Produce, San Diego, CA, 2019
- “Being Here With You / Estando aquÌ contigo,” Museum of Contemporary Art San Diego, CA, 2018
- "Skyjacking Above, Tunneling Below," nGbK. Berlin, Germany, 2017
- "A Border Peepshow," Velaslavasay Panorama, Los Angeles, CA, 2017
- "Lives of Specimens," San Diego Natural History Museum, San Diego CA, 2017
- "Border Film Week," Joan B. Croc School of Peace Studies Galleries, University of San Diego, 2016
- "Replica Real," Biomuseo. Panama City, Panama, 2015
- "Eyes As Sieves," Global Committee, Brooklyn, NY, 2015
- "NoExit:Postcard," OKK: Organ Kritishcer Kunst. Berlin, Germany, 2015
- "Pacific Standard Time Place and Practice Symposium," Tijuana, MX + San Diego, CA: Storylines TJ/SD, 2015
- “Fluid States,” Museo de Arte Contemporaneo, Panama City, Panama, 2015

== Selected publications ==
- Kate Clark and David Serlin. "Materializing Disability and Queerness in Three Objects". In, Turning Archival: The Life of the Historical in Queer Studies, (Eds.) Daniel Marshall and Zeb Tortorici, Date University Press, 2022 doi:10.1515/9781478022589-012
- Queen’s Circle: Cruising Oral Histories of Balboa Park, Burn All Books Press, 2019

== Collections ==
- Museum of Contemporary Art San Diego
- Seattle Convention Center
- Seattle Parks Foundation
