= Velas =

Velas may refer to:

== Places ==
- Velas, Azores, Portugal
- Velas, Maharashtra, India
- Cabo Velas, Costa Rica

== People ==
- Sara Velas, American artist
