= Plaza Del Valle =

Plaza Del Valle is an outdoor lifestyle center located in a retail and entertainment complex in Panorama City, California, United States, built, managed, and operated by Agora Realty and Management Inc.. It has now become a tourist destination as it is located in the heart of the San Fernando Valley.

== History ==
Development of the retail and entertainment complex began with a visit to San Miguel de Allende that inspired the development. Plaza Del Valle bought items from San Miguel de Allende to theme the Plaza and a vibrant Latino center of town. Agora did not want to build a normal development, but a community town center for the city of Panorama City. Plaza Del Valle opened in 1999 and has been a popular outdoor lifestyle ever since. The center had a major remodel that completed in 2004 which transformed the property into a half mile walking street.

== Design ==
The half a mile outdoor marketplace is located in Panorama City in Los Angeles County, California. Plaza Del Valle's design inspiration San Miguel de Allende and its over 100 tenants that include everyday needs, lifestyle/specialty shops, and entertainment aiming to create a community town center rather than a standard development.

== Information ==
Plaza Del Valle is an outdoor lifestyle center including retail stores, restaurants and entertainment choices set in the heart of the San Fernando Valley in Panorama City, the densest communities in the San Fernando Valley. The Plaza Del Valle is the most dominant retail center in the region. With this shopping center, a town center was created where none had existed before. The developer provided family amenities that encourage shoppers and residents to make it a destination, thereby organically incubating the growth for further development as a commercial and civic center. The Plaza Del Valle has free parking lot and shaded outdoor dining areas.

== Events ==
Plaza Del Valle is known for hosting a wide range of events that cater to the local community. These include holiday celebrations, live music performances, fitness classes, and more, all of which are free and open to the public. The plaza serves as a gathering place where people come to connect, making it a symbol of community pride and resilience. These events are free and open to the public.

== Location and Accessibility ==
Plaza Del Valle is located at 8610 Van Nuys Boulevard, Panorama City, CA 91402. It is easily accessible by car or public transportation, with ample parking available on site. The center is served by several bus lines, including the Metro Orange Line.

It features free parking and shaded outdoor dining areas, enhancing the shopping and dining experience for visitors.
