= Lisa Black =

Lisa Black may refer to:

- Lisa Black (rhythmic gymnast) (born 1967), British rhythmic gymnast
- Lisa Black (sculptor) (born 1982), New Zealand sculptor and jeweller
- Lisa Hartman Black (born 1956), American actress and singer

== See also ==
- Lisa (rapper), member of Blackpink
