= Robert Owen (artist) =

Australian artist and curator (born 1937)

- Born: June 29, 1937 (age 89); Sydney
- Education: National Art School, Sydney
- Years active: 1962-present

Robert George Owen (born 29 June 1937) is an Australian artist and curator. He lives and works in Melbourne, Australia.

== Early life and education ==
Robert Owen was born in Sydney in 1937, and studied sculpture at the National Art School in Sydney under Lyndon Dadswell.

== Art practice and career ==
He has played a formative role in the development of some of Australia's major arts education and institutional structures.

Owen's art practice includes sculpture, installation, painting, photography and major public commissions. His work is linked through a poetic and intuitive sensitivity to the expressive potential of space, light, colour, context and materials. Throughout his career Owen has ‘steered a path between science, metaphysics and abstraction as a way of investigating the representational sublime.'

After graduating from art school in 1962, Owen lived on the Greek isle of Hydra from 1963 to 1966 and became part of an expatriate community that included George Johnston, Charmian Clift, William Lederer, Leonard Cohen, and Jack Hirschman. From 1966 – 1975 Owen lived in London where he worked as a studio assistant to John Ernest, Anthony Hill and other British Constructionists, and also as a conservator for Victor Pasmore and Ben Nicholson. During this time Owen developed constructionist works and exhibited with Malborough New London Gallery in both London and New York.

In 1975 Owen returned to Australia and became actively involved in the Sydney art culture, both as an artist, representing Australia at the 38th Venice Biennale in 1978; and as a Founding Member of Artspace and Member of The Biennale of Sydney. Upon his return to Australia, Owen's art practice shifted focus to Site-specific and Installation art concerned with concept and expanded sense experience, adding layers of metaphysical and symbolic narrative to cultural history (1975-1992).

In 1987 Owen moved to Melbourne as Artist in Residence at the Victorian College of the Arts. From 1989 to 2001 he was Associate Professor and Head of Sculpture at RMIT University, where he implemented a graduate and postgraduate exchange programme with Utrecht School of the Arts and the Gerrit Rietveld Academie, Amsterdam. In 1992 he was a research fellow in Virtual Environments for free Form Design in the Invited Artists program of Advanced Computer Graphics Centre, CITRI, RMIT University.

In the early 1990s he returned to the topographical abstraction of colour, space and light through painting and sculpture (1992-). Owen's experience as a curator of contemporary art includes Sound Works for the 1982 Biennale of Sydney and the exhibition Inland for the Australian Centre for Contemporary Art, Melbourne in 1990. Since the early 2000s, Owen has also undertaken Public Art commissions that have extended his installation practice in a broader social context. Owen received the Australian Council Visual Arts/Crafts Emeritus Award in 2003.

Robert Owen is currently represented by Arc One Gallery and is a member of Artery Co-operative Ltd.

== Exhibitions ==
Owen has had over forty years experience as an artist, exhibiting widely since the late 1960s in over 40 solo and 110 group exhibitions in Australia and internationally, and has represented Australia in major international exhibitions including the 38th Venice Biennale in 1978. Major solo exhibitions of Owen's work have included Different Lights Cast Different Shadows, The 2nd Balnaves Foundation Sculpture Project at the Art Gallery of New South Wales, Sydney, in 2004; The Text of Light at the TarraWarra Museum of Art, Victoria, in 2004; and Between Shadow and Light – London Works 1966-1975 at Monash University Gallery, Melbourne, in 1999.

Significant group exhibitions include Four Australian Artists (Boyd, Hessing and Nolan) at Richard Demarco Gallery, Edinburgh, Scotland, in 1970; Documentation at Maki & Tamuta Gallery, Tokyo, Japan, in 1978; the Biennale of Sydney in 1979 and 1986; D’un autre Continent: L’Australie la rêve et le réel at the ARC/Musée d’Art Moderne de la Ville de Paris, France in 1983; Olympiad of Art at the Seoul Olympic Park, Korea in 1988; Australian Sculpture Triennial, National Gallery of Victoria, Melbourne in 1981, 1987 and 1993; aussemblage! at Auckland City Art Gallery, Auckland, NZ in 1994; Spirit + Place: Art in Australia 1861–1996 at the Museum of Contemporary Art, Sydney, in 1996–97; Contemporary Australia: Optimism at the Gallery of Modern Art Brisbane Queensland in 2008; Art & Kabbalah: Contemporary Responses to an Ancient Tradition at the Jewish Museum of Australia, Melbourne, in 2000; Australia, Contemporary Non-Objective Art at the Museum im Kulturspeicher, Würzburg, Germany, in 2008 and Sight & Sound, Music and Abstraction in Australian Art at the Arts Centre Melbourne, in 2010.

== Awards and commissions ==
Owen has received several of the nation's highest honours in the visual arts.

Owen's first major recognition was the John Moore's Liverpool Exhibition 7 Uk Prize held at the Walker Art Gallery in Liverpool in 1969, with a work influenced by minimalism and constructivism referencing nature and memory. In 1978 he represented Australia at the 38th Venice Biennale: From Nature to Art, From Art to Nature with Ken Unsworth and John Davis. Owen was awarded the Australian Council Visual Arts/Crafts Emeritus Award for a lifelong service to the visual arts in 2003. In 2015 he received the Woollahra Small Sculpture Prize, Sydney, for a sculpture continuing investigation into geometry, proportion and visual poetry.

Robert Owen's public commissions include: Under the Sun for Point Cook Town Centre, Melbourne, in collaboration with Joanna Buckley in 2014; Silence and Falling Light for Arts Centre Melbourne with Fine Art Studio in 2011–2012; Tracing Light - For Harry 3D/4D for Harry's Park, Harry Seidler Architects Sydney in 2011; New Constellation (sculpture) and Interlude - Double Weave (painting) for the MLC Centre, Harry Seidler Architects, Sydney in 2007; Melbourne’s Northern Gateway, Craigieburn Bypass with Architects Taylor Cullity Lethlean and Tonkin Zulaikha Greer for VIC Roads Hume Freeway Development, Victoria in 2004; Memory Pond, fountain, light and text installation for Grattan Gardens Plaza, Prahran, Melbourne in 2001; Discobolus, Hellenic Tribute, a sculpture installation for Olympic Park, Homebush Bay, Sydney 2000 Olympics; Axiom, a sculpture installation for the New Commonwealth Law Courts, Melbourne in 1998; Vessel, a public sculpture for the Nippon Exhibition Centre, Chiba, Japan in 1989 and Webb Bridge, Docklands, Melbourne in collaboration with DCM architects in 2003, for which Owen and DCM Architects were awarded the prestigious Joseph Reed Architectural award for urban design in 2005.

In 2016 Owen was appointed the City of Melbourne's Public Art Curatorial Advisor for redevelopment of Carlton's University Square.

== Collections ==
Owen's work is represented in all of Australia's national and state galleries, and in public and private collections worldwide including the British Museum, London; Stedelijk Museum, Amsterdam; Israel Museum, Jerusalem; The Museum of Modern Art, New York; Olympic Sculpture Park, Seoul, Korea; the National Museum of Western Art, Tokyo, Japan; Museo de Arts de São Paulo, Brazil, National Institute of Fine Arts, Mexico City, National Gallery of Modern Art, New Delhi, India; Staatliche Museum, West Berlin; Banque National De Paris, France; the Art Gallery of New South Wales, Sydney; and the Museum of Contemporary Art, Sydney.

== Publications ==
- Wayne Tunnicliffe, Zara Stanhope & George Alexander, ‘Different Lights Cast Different Shadows’, catalogue essays, Art Gallery of New South Wales 2004
- John Barbour, Paul Carter and George Alexander; Robert Owen (ed.), 'Inland, Corresponding Places', exhibition catalogue, Australian Centre for Contemporary Art, 1990
- George Alexander, 'Transits', monograph, Wagga Wagga City Art Gallery, NSW, 1988
