= Panorama High School =

School in California, United States

Coordinates: 34.216602°N 118.449547°W

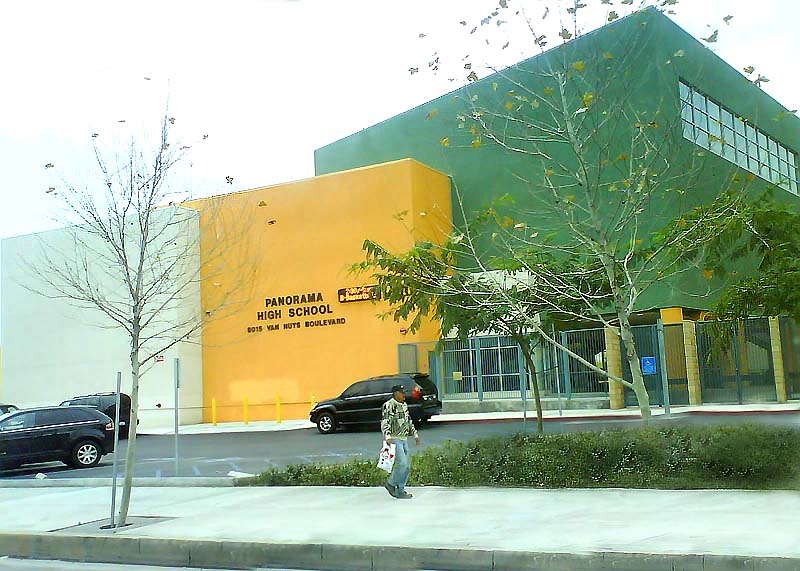
- 8015 Van Nuys Blvd, Panorama City, Los Angeles, California 91402

Information
- School type: Public high school
- Established: October 3, 2006; 20 years ago
- Status: 🟩 Opened
- Locale: City, Large
- School district: Los Angeles Unified School District
- NCES District ID: 0622710
- NCES School ID: 062271011653
- Principal: Joe Nardulli
- Teaching staff: 71.70 (on an FTE basis)
- Grades: 9–12
- Enrollment: 1,316 (2024–25)
  - Male: 674
  - Female: 642
- Student to teacher ratio: 18.35
- Colors: Gold and Black
- Mascot: Python
- Nickname: Pythons
- Website: Official website

Panorama Senior High School is a public high school located on Van Nuys Boulevard in the Panorama City district of Los Angeles, California, United States. Designed by architect DLR Group WWCOT, Panorama High School opened in 2006 to students in grades 9, 10, 11 and 12. The school is a part of the Los Angeles Unified School District. The school serves the Panorama City, Arleta and Van Nuys sections of Los Angeles in the San Fernando Valley. Panorama High School's mascot is a python and the school colors are gold and black.

== History ==
Panorama opened in fall 2006 with grades 9, 10, and 11, and then added 12th grade in 2007. In June 2008, the first students graduated from the school. Panorama relieved overcrowding at Van Nuys High School, Birmingham High School, James Monroe High School, and Polytechnic High School. The opening allowed for Van Nuys High School to return to a traditional calendar. Prior to having the name Panorama High School, the school was known as East Valley Area New High School #3.

The school had previously had a variety of after school classes within an after school program from October 2007 to June 2010. The after school classes were film production, dj music, urban art, sound art, etc. By September 2010, Panorama cancelled the after school classes, leaving only after school tutoring instead.

The first principal of Panorama High School, Sue Lepisto, retired in June 2010. She was replaced by Elias de la Torre in September 2010 and then replaced by Rafael Gaeta who was principal up till the end of the 2019-2020 school year with Joe Narduli who also was the principal at Vista Middle School up until the end of the 2019-2020 school year and being the current principal of Panorama High School from 2020–Present.

== Athletics ==
The school has its own softball, baseball, water polo, football, flag football, basketball, soccer, volleyball, swimming, wrestling, Golf and track teams. The school has two gymnasiums, a heated swimming pool, one fitness room, and a weight room.

== Filming ==
- Panorama High School served as the location of the Costa Verde High School for Heroes (NBC) in late 2007. It also was the studio for the High School Musical Film Series.
