= Alex Seton =

Australian artist (born 1977)

- Born: 1977 (age 48–49); Sydney, Australia
- Education: College of Fine Arts, UNSW (B.A., 1998)
- Known for: Sculpture, marble carving, photography, video, installation
- Awards: Woollahra Small Sculpture Prize; Fondation François Schneider Grand Jury prize (2015)

Alex Seton (born 1977) is an Australian artist, known for his contemporary use of marble carving. He also works in sculpture, photography, video and installation.

He has been a two-time finalist in the Wynne Prize, won the Woollahra Small Sculpture Prize, and been named as the Art Gallery of NSW Director’s Choice Winner at Sculpture by the Sea three times.

In 2015, Seton was awarded a Grand Jury prize at the Fondation François Schneider ‘Contemporary Talents’ competition. He was the Inaugural Nancy Fairfax Artist in Residence, Margaret Olley Art Centre, Tweed River Art Gallery, Murwillumbah, in 2014; and in 2012 participated in the Omi International Arts Center residency program in New York.

Seton lives and works in Newtown, an inner suburb of Sydney, Australia.

== Early life and education ==
Seton was born in Sydney, Australia. He is one of four brothers, one of whom, Ben Seton, is an actor. He was raised in Sydney and attended the exclusive school St. Ignatius Riverview. His family's rural property is at Wombeyan Caves located in the Southern Highlands (New South Wales).

This rural upbringing saw him raised near the Wombeyan Caves Marble Quarry, which operated continuously from 1915 – 1997 before being closed due to decreasing demand and environmental concerns. Seton has credited this early exposure to marble with his interest in the medium.

His mother left Cairo in the 1960s after it had become a socialist republic under Gamal Abdel Nasser's government to settle in Australia. Growing up listening to stories of displacement fostered a strong interest in migration and his mother's relocation to Australia, something he continues to explore through his art works.

Seton honed his craft through internships and residencies with Italian carving studios, an experience that continues to influence his work. He graduated in Art History and Theory from the College of Fine Arts, University of New South Wales, in 1998.

== Career ==
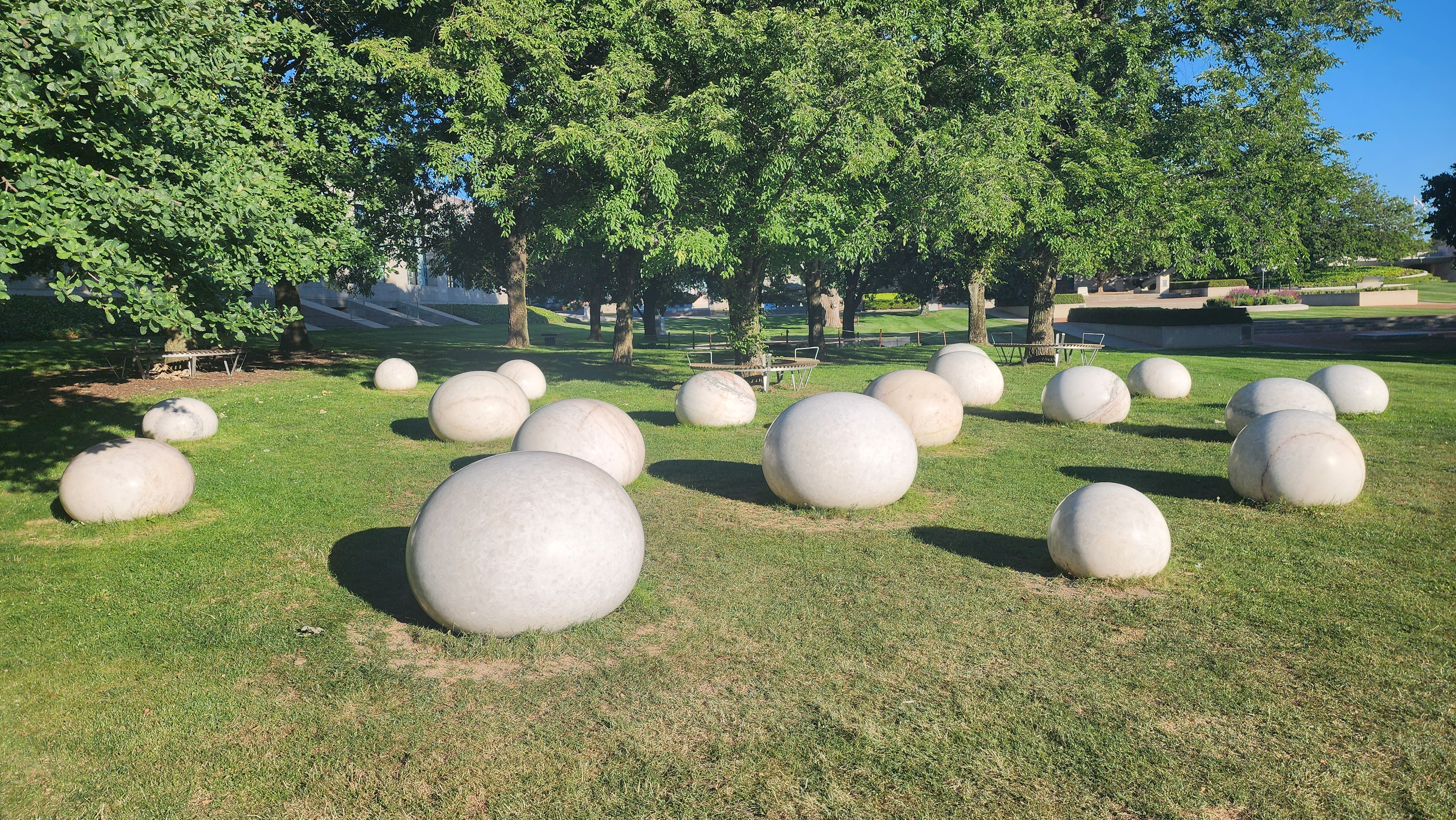
For Every Drop Shed in Anguish in the Australian War Memorial sculpture garden

Seton is known for his use of marble and traditional carving techniques in contemporary ways, which has positioned him as one of Australia’s foremost living sculptors. He frequently works directly with contemporary political issues, such as Australia’s treatment of asylum seekers, and questions of conflict and nationhood.

In 2017, his work Refuge was included in the Kochi-Muziris Biennale (India) following exhibition in Paris in 2016 as part of The Journey at Galerie Paris Beijing. 2017 also saw a survey exhibition of Seton’s works about asylum seekers at Newcastle Art Gallery, called The Island.

In 2014 he participated in the Adelaide Biennial: Dark Heart, producing the large sculptural installation Someone died trying to have a life like mine, twenty-eight life inflatable jackets made in marble. The installation referenced an event of May 2013, in which 28 life jackets were found washed ashore the Cocos Islands, a known departure point for refugees attempting to reach Australia by boat. The work garnered critical and popular acclaim, and was acquired by the Art Gallery of South Australia.

In 2011 the Australian War Memorial acquired and commissioned the ongoing work As of today (2011–14), which is composed of one folded marble flag for every Australian casualty in Operation Slipper in Afghanistan. This work reflects Seton’s interest in Australian politics, ideas of patriotism and nationalism and the symbols attributed to them.

Seton has also regularly shown at art fairs both in Australia and internationally. He has exhibited in the last five Hong Kong and Art HK fairs, as well as participated in Sydney Contemporary, Art International Istanbul, Art Stage Singapore, Art Paris, and Art Stage Jakarta. In 2012 Seton showed his solo exhibition Elegy on Resistance at Art HK, featuring as its centerpiece Soloist (2012), a lone hooded figure sitting cross-legged.

== Awards and prizes ==
- 2016: Wynne Prize, Art Gallery of NSW, finalist
- 2016: Talents Contemporains, Fondation François Schneider, winner
- 2016: Fleurieu Art Prize, Anne & Gordon Samstag Museum of Art, finalist
- 2014: Il Henraux International Sculpture Award, Querceta, Italy, finalist
- 2014: University of Queensland National Artists’ Self Portrait Prize, University of Queensland, People’s Choice award
- 2014: Inaugural Nancy Fairfax Artist in Residence, Margaret Olley Art Centre, Tweed River Art Gallery, Murwillumbah
- 2013: University of Queensland National Artists’ Self Portrait Prize, University of Queensland, finalist
- 2013: Wynne Prize, Art Gallery of New South Wales, finalist
- 2012: Art OMI Australia, Art OMI International Artists Residency, New York, USA
- 2009: Woollahra Small Sculpture Prize, Sydney, winner
- 2009: Sculpture by the Sea, Art Gallery of New South Wales Director’s Choice Award, Sydney, winner
- 2009: Prometheus Visual Arts Award, The Prometheus Foundation, Gold Coast, winner
- 2008: Woollahra Small Sculpture Prize, Sydney, special commendation
- 2007: Hanyu International Sculpture Cup, Shenzhen, China
- 2007: The Flying Fruit Fly Circus Residency, Albury Regional Gallery, Albury
- 2006: Helen Lempriere Sculpture Award, People’s Choice Award, Sydney, winner
- 2005: Woollahra Small Sculpture Prize, People’s Choice Award, Sydney, winner
- 2005: McClelland Sculpture Survey and Award, Langwarrin, finalist
- 2004: Sculpture by the Sea, Art Gallery of New South Wales Director’s Choice Award, Sydney, winner
- 2004: The Riverview Art Prize, Sydney
- 2003: Sculpture by the Sea, Art Gallery of New South Wales Director’s Choice Award, Sydney, winner
- 2003: Sculpture by the Sea, John Fairfax Young Artist’s Subsidy, Sydney
- 2002: Sculpture by the Sea, The Australian Unrepresented Sculptor Award, Sydney, winner
- 2002: Sculpture by the Sea, The Young Sculptor’s Honorable Mention, Sydney
- 2002: The Sculptors Society, Sydney, Second Prize
- 1997: Nescafe Big Break Award, runner up
- 1994: Mosman Youth Prize First Prize and Anne Ferguson Award, Mosman Art Gallery, Sydney
- 1994: Art Express, Art Gallery of New South Wales, Sydney

== Collections ==
Seton’s work is held in numerous collections including the National Gallery of Australia; Artbank; Art Gallery of South Australia; Australian War Memorial; Newcastle Art Gallery; Bendigo Art Gallery; the Danish Royal Art Collection, Copenhagen; HBO Collection, New York; University of Queensland Art Museum; Queensland University of Technology; Albury Regional Gallery; the Patrick Corrigan Collection, Sydney; and the Art Gallery of NSW Society; as well as numerous private collections nationally and internationally.
