= Sanné Mestrom =

Australian sculptor, artist (born 1979)

Sanné Mestrom is an Australian experimental and conceptual artist who works mainly in the mediums of installation and sculpture. Mestrom has a research-based practice and incorporates notions of "play" into social aspects of urban design. Since 2011, Mestrom has remade and reinterpreted motifs from the twentieth century modernist art canon. She has earned many grants and has been commissioned to execute public art, sculptures in situ. She has studied in Korea and Mexico, and is a senior lecturer at Sydney College of Art.

== Early life and education ==
Mestrom was born in 1979 in Heerlen in the Netherlands and came to Australia, via New Zealand, as a 17-year-old. She studied fine art at Royal Melbourne Institute of Technology (RMIT), graduating with honours in 2000. In 2008 she completed a PhD thesis on the power of place and the politics of perception, followed in 2011 by a Graduate Certificate in Public Art. Mestrom was appointed senior lecturer at Sydney College of the Arts (Sculpture), University of Sydney, in 2019. She is currently working on a master's degree in landscape architecture. Her academic research about public art is based on her own practice, and focuses on how public art can become integrated, inclusive and interactive spaces. She is examining how people can interact with art in ways that become play.

In 2001 Maestro was resident at Sangmyong University, Seoul, South Korea and in 2007 at SOMAmexico art school in Mexico City. From 2010 to 2012 Mestrom was a studio artist at Gertrude Contemporary Art Spaces in Melbourne, Australia.

== Career ==
Mestrom was commissioned for the Westbourne Grammar School in the Melbourne suburb of Truganina, completing an outdoor sculpture, Loose Variables. In 2013, she produced The Bell Curve, for the Australian Centre for Contemporary Art in Melbourne, for their exhibition NEW13. In 2014, Mestrom won the third annual Ian Potter Sculpture Commission sponsored by Monash University Museum of Art in Melbourne.

From 2007 to 2018 Mestrom won 17 grants to develop her research and her art works.

== Work ==
Mestrom began as a painter in 2004 and moved to explorations of space using sculpture in 2009. She has worked in many different materials—cement, bronze, wood and plastic.

In 2010 Mestrom was part of the Group Exhibition "the Nothing" at the West Space in Melbourne and Chalk Horse Gallery in Sydney.

Weeping Woman (2014), produced for Monash University museum of art, consists of three monumental concrete statues of female forms that are also fountains.

Since 2011, Mestrom's work has reflected modernist movements of the twentieth century, particularly the work of the modernists including Morandi, Picasso, Brancusi and Matisse. She renders concepts of paintings as sculpture, questioning how culture and setting influenced how we look at art. She may make copies of iconic works in different materials—bronze in place of marble or plastic in place of stone.

In 2014 Mestrom worked with her mother, a tapestry maker in regional Victoria, to create the Black Paintings series in 2014. The exhibition was reshown in 2018 at the McClelland Sculpture Gallery. The series reflected back on the work of Frank Stella (b. 1936) who executed a "Black Painting Series" (1958–1960). In addition to paintings, the exhibition included screens with various textile touches and pieces of hard materials connections and holding elements. In 2019, her exhibition There is a Poem focused on human behaviour, especially in the public environment. Her work You and Me was included and purchased by the National Gallery of Australia. In 2020 Mestrom's work was included in the Know My Name, Women Artists 1900 to Now at the National Gallery of Australia.

== Awards and recognition ==
- 2006 Finalist in the Robert Jacks Drawing Prize at the Bendigo Regional Art Gallery.
- 2006 Winner, Siemens Post Graduate Fine Art Scholarship Award
- 2011 Winner, John Fries Memorial Prize, Sydney
- 2013 Winner, Credit Suisse / Art & Australia Emerging Artist Award for 2013/14

== Collections ==
- Art Gallery of New South Wales (Black Painting (i))
- Gippsland Art Gallery (Rubins Vase II)
- Monash University Museum of Art (Weeping Women)
- Museum of Contemporary Art Australia (Soft Kiss)
- National Gallery of Australia (Me & you)
- RMIT Gallery (Me & You)
- University of Technology Sydney Gallery(Self portrait, sleeping muse)

== Exhibitions ==
- Gippsland Art Gallery (Corrections)
- McClelland Sculpture Park and Gallery (Black Paintings)
