= Velaslavasay Panorama =

Movie theater in Los Angeles, California, United States

Coordinates: 34.0342°N 118.2847°W

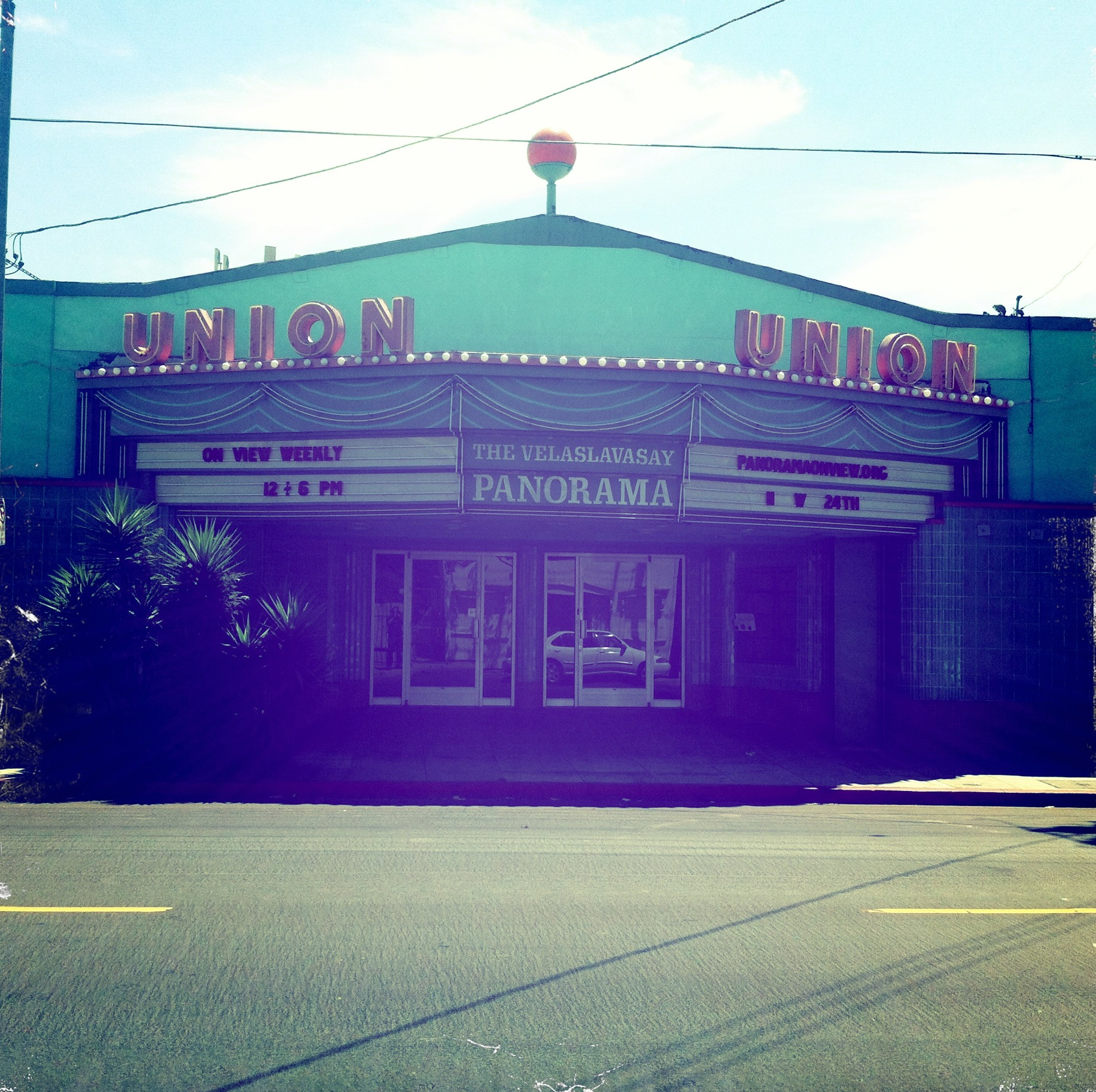
Velaslavasay Panorama exterior and marquee, August 2012

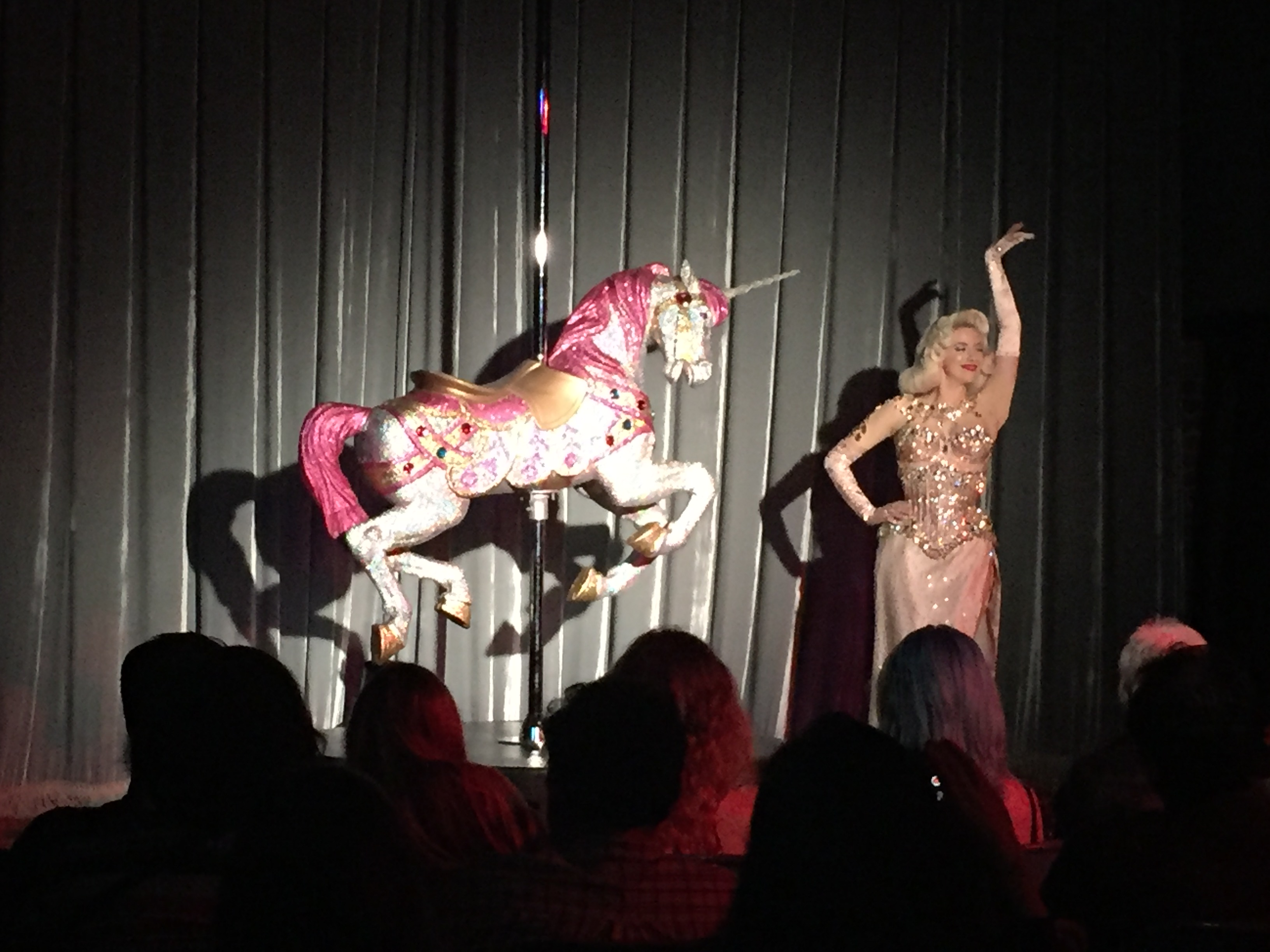
Burlesque artist Miss Tosh performing at the Velaslavasay Panorama, April 2017.

The Velaslavasay Panorama is an exhibition hall, theatre and gardens in Los Angeles, California. It features a painted 360-degree panorama, the only one created in the United States since the 19th century. The Velaslavasay Panorama was originally established by artist Sara Velas in 2000 at the Tswuun-Tswuun Rotunda on Hollywood Boulevard. The museum's name combines Velas' last name with her mother's maiden name, Asay. In 2004, its original venue threatened with demolition, the panorama moved to its present location at the Union Theatre in Historical West Adams.

== Panorama history and context ==
The word “panorama” combines the Greek roots “pan,” meaning “all”, and “horama,” meaning “view.” The panorama was a popular entertainment format throughout the 18th and 19th centuries and therefore can be understood as a predecessor to 20th century cinema and emerging virtual reality technologies today. Velas reflects that by situating the panorama as “pre-cinematic” creates a hierarchy between “BC” (before cinema” and “AD” (after digital), when in reality it is representative of changing evolution of popular entertainment formats throughout history.

Unveiled in 2000 at the Hollywood Boulevard location, The Panorama of the Valley of the Smokes was the first panorama exhibited in the US since the 19th century. Other painted panoramas located in the U.S. are historical panoramas from the 19th century that commemorate the Civil War: Paul Philippoteaux's The High Water Mark at Gettysburg (1884) is in Gettysburg National Military Park and William Wehner's Battle of Atlanta (1896) formerly located in that city's Grant Park. As of 2017, the cyclorama was under restoration and said to be relocated to a newly built 23,000-square-foot Lloyd and Mary Ann Whitaker Cyclorama building at the Atlanta History Center.

== Location ==
=== Hollywood location ===
The Velaslavasay Panorama was originally located in a 1968 Googie-style building on Hollywood Boulevard until it was demolished in 2004. The building formerly housed the Chu Chu Chinese Restaurant. The panorama exhibit displayed at the Hollywood Boulevard location, painted by Velas, was entitled The Panorama of the Valley of the Smokes, depicting a view of the Los Angeles area as it may have appeared in 1792, the year that Robert Barker's very first panorama was unveiled. Velas envisioned the panorama's design from photographs and histories collected from the Los Angeles Public Library.

=== West Adams re-location ===
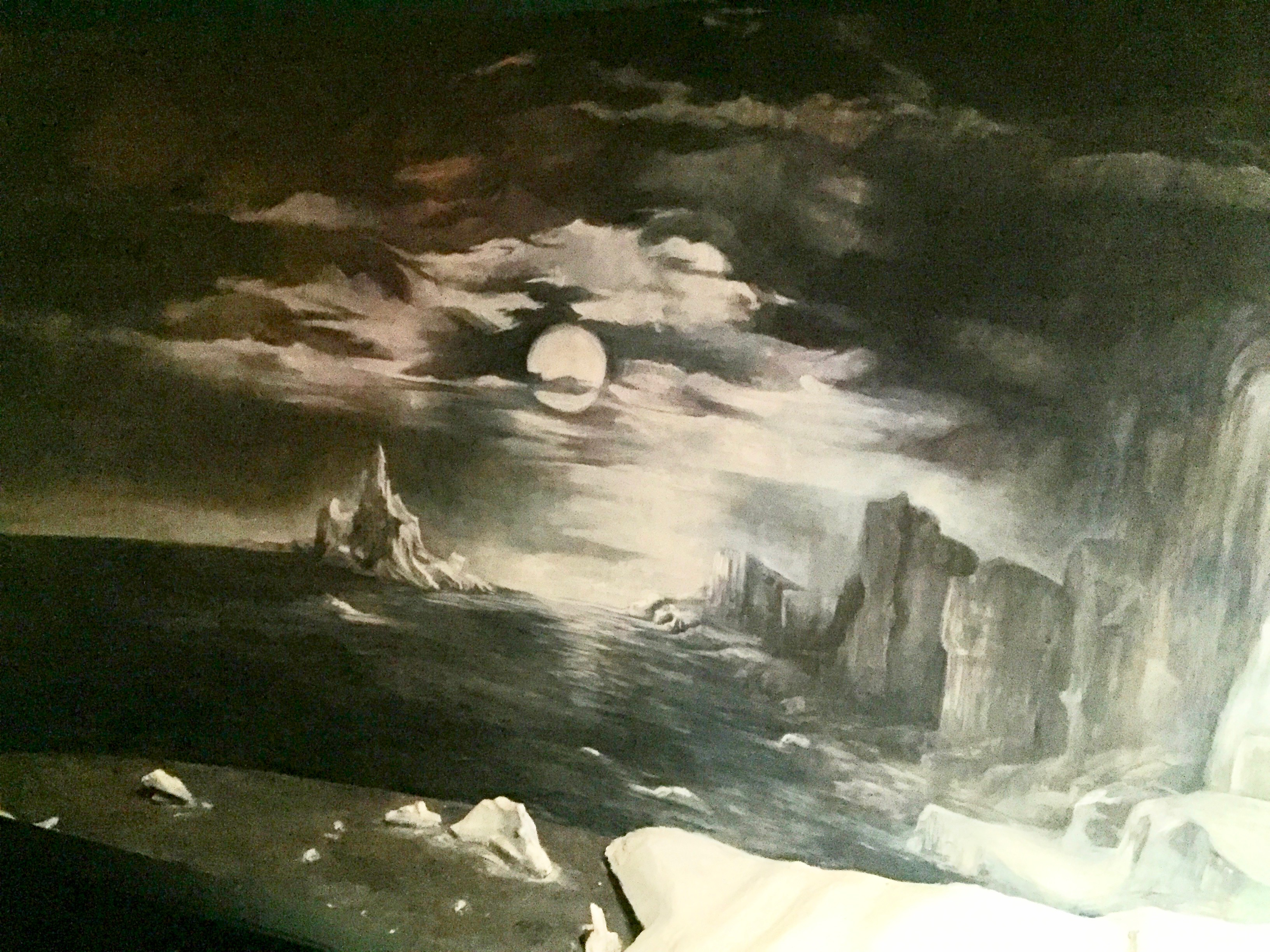
"Effulgence of the North" at the panorama in 2017.

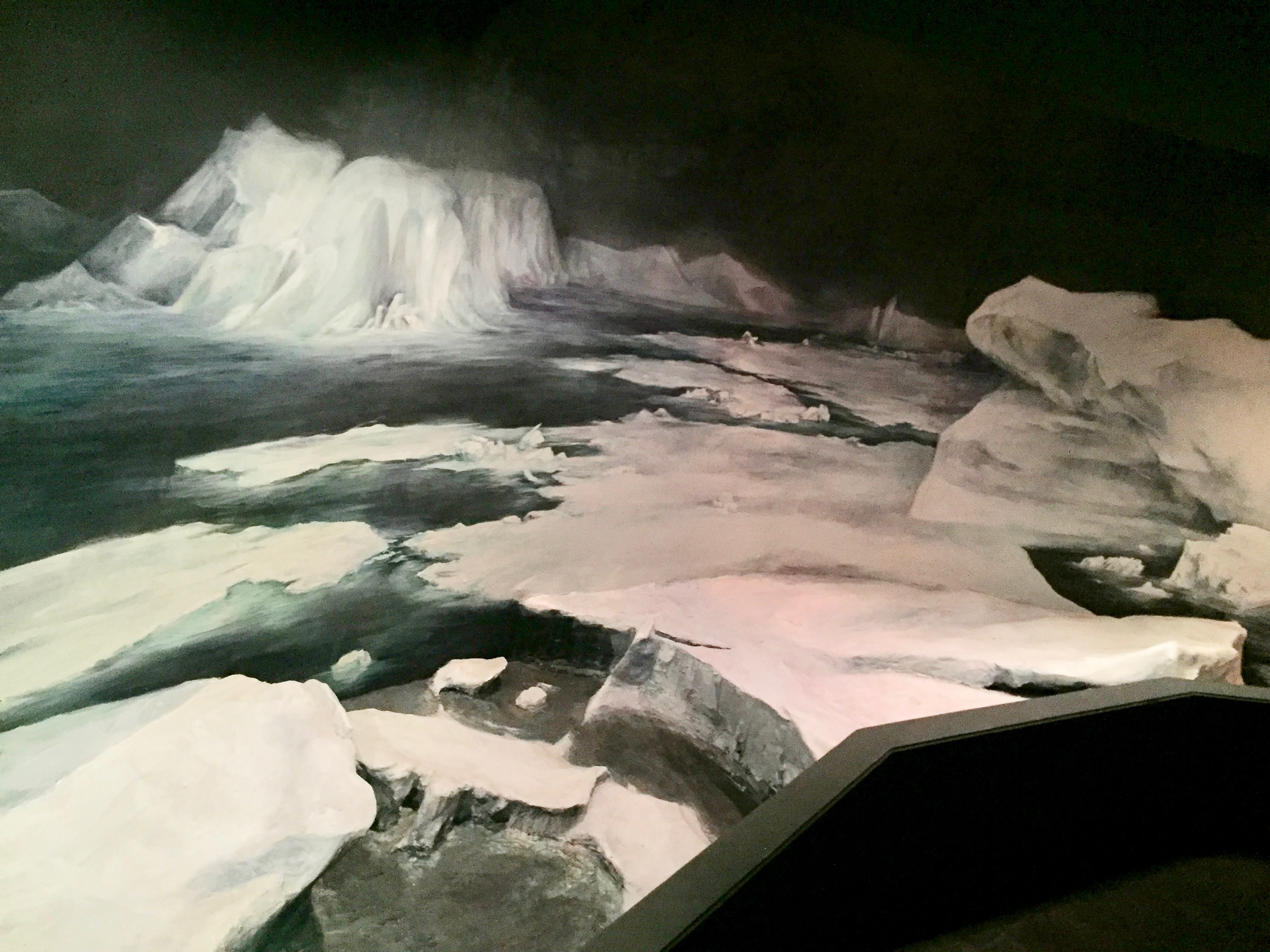
"Effulgence of the North" at the panorama in 2017.

After being displaced from the Hollywood location in 2004 because of planned development, the Velaslavasay relocated to the historical West Adams neighborhood. The second panorama installation, Effulgence of the North, which depicts scenes of the Arctic from the era of its 19th-century exploration, debuted at the new Union Theatre location in July 2007 and remained on display until September 2017.

The Union Theatre was originally built in 1910 as a motion picture hall and was named for the nearby Union Square, once a bustling hub along LA's past Red Car trolley system. The Union Theatre has been home to a variety of organizations prior to the Velaslavasay Panorama. Notably, it served as a meeting hall for the Tile Layers Union Local #18 throughout the mid-late 20th century. Prior to that, in 1935, former screen vamp Louise Glaum opened an acting school and playhouse here, calling it Louise Glaum's Little Theater at Union Square. Then in 1939, it was reconfigured back into a film venue, the Union, and operated under that name until it closed in 1953. For a time in the 1970s, while serving as the headquarters for the Tile Layers, a student organization from nearby USC operated an after-hours weekly film series, showing cult and underground films and Saturday cartoon matinees for the neighborhood children. This K-Bel Theatre Film Society operated until 1975.

== Exhibitions ==
=== The Grand Moving Mirror of California (GMMOCA) ===
The venue has also hosted moving panoramas, among them the Grand Moving Mirror of California, which debuted in 2010, and remains on display.

This project developed in 2005 after the Velaslavasay received a copy of what had been the accompanying document to an original moving panorama that traced the journey from the East coast down through South America and to California during the Gold Rush era. The script had originally accompanied a moving panorama painting that was toured around New England in 1855 by a Dr. L. E. Emerson. The painting itself did not survive to the present. The Velaslavasay adapted the original document based on the archival script, which was read during its exhibition. In order to stay true to the historic essence of the text, the editing process was not additive - words and sections of text were taken out but nothing new was put into the text. From this adaptation, an original moving panorama painting was created that did not attempt to recreate what might have actually existed during the 19th century. Artist Guan Rong spent almost two years designing the compositions and painting a canvas that would result in a 270-foot long moving panorama. A second, smaller version of the panorama painting was recreated for traveling shows and has been displayed in Berlin and Seoul as a part of Clemens Krümmel's “Talking Picture Blues” exhibition.

=== Nova Tuskhut ===
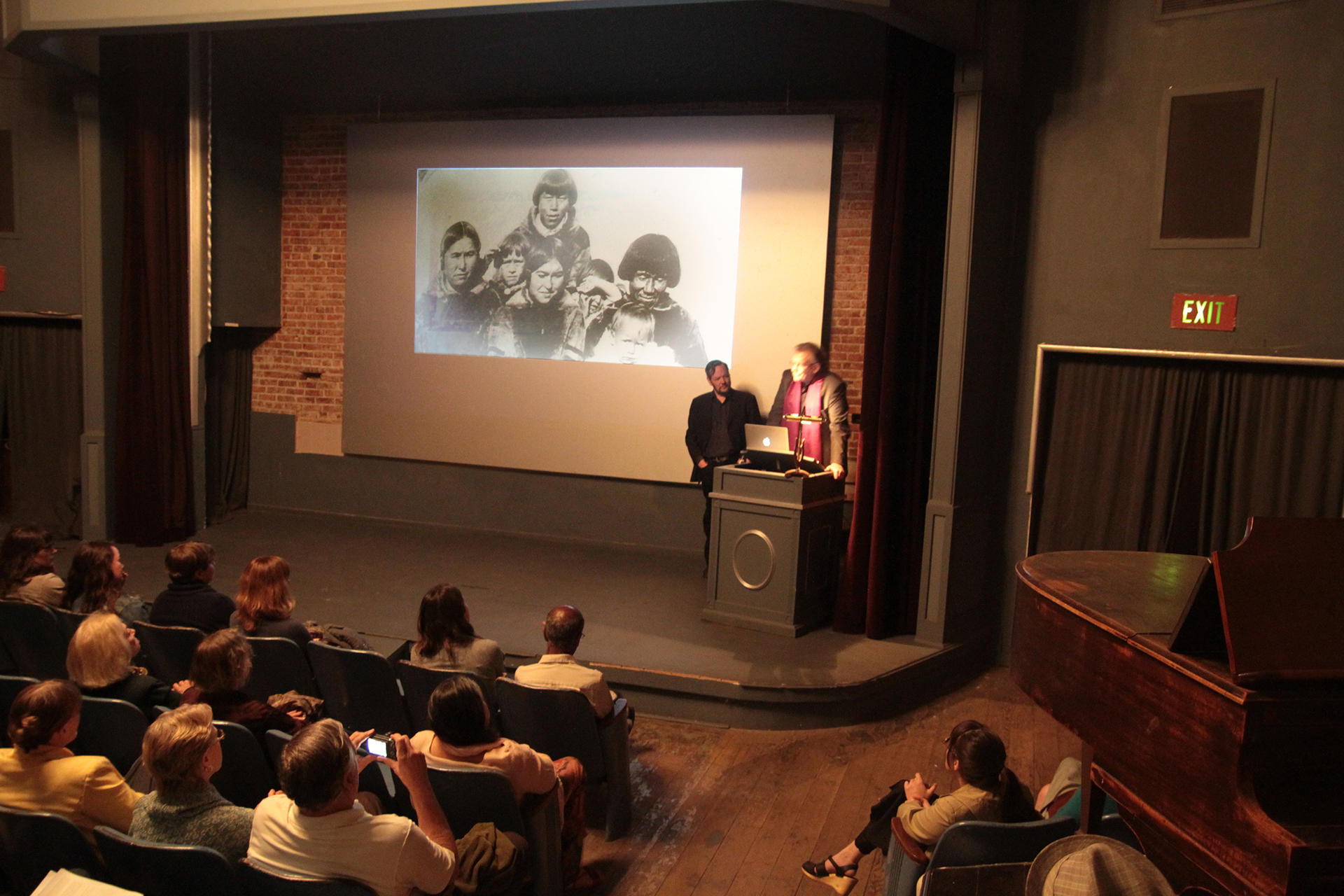
Lecture by Harper and Potter

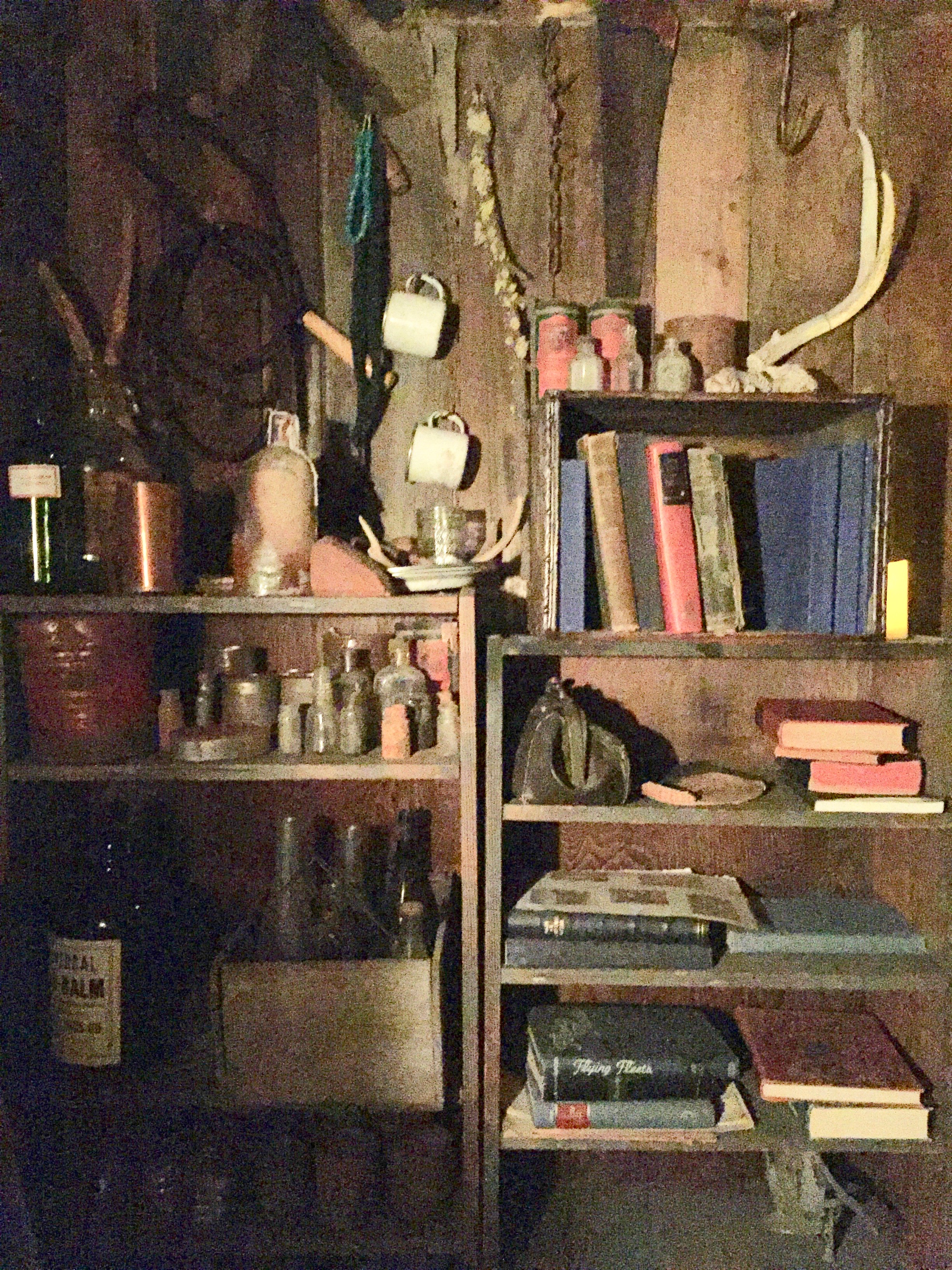
Inside the Nova Tuskhut.

In 2014, the Velaslavasay Panorama added a new attraction, the Nova Tuskhut, replicating the interior of a trading post in the Arctic regions, and featuring a miniature dioramic view through its window. Its debut was accompanied by an exhibit of materials related to the appearance of Inuit in Hollywood films from the silent era to the 1940s with memorabilia relating to early Inuit film star Nancy Columbia. The event was marked by a joint lecture, "Before Nanook," by two prominent Arctic historians, Kenn Harper and Russell Potter, as well as a series of movies with polar themes, entitled Mush: To The Movies.

=== A Border Peepshow ===
In 2017, the Velaslavasay Panorama collaborated with Parkeology, a public art program that excavates histories from urban parks and museums through live interpretive events, to create A Border Peepshow. Four peepshows depicting scenes of the San Diego/Tijuana border from 1887, 1927. 1967 and 2017 provide views of the political separation of a culturally and ecologically connected terrain.

=== Shengjing Panorama ===
From 2012 to 2019, the Velaslavasay Panorama was working on the Shengjing Panorama 《盛京全景图》, the first-ever China-US collaborative panorama depicting the city of Shenyang from the years 1910 to 1930. The panorama went on display in 2019. The panorama was painted over a period of five years by Chinese panorama masters 李武 Li Wu, 晏阳 Yan Yang, and 周福先 Zhou Fuxian from the Lu Xun Academy of Fine Arts. Shengjing Panorama depicts an urban Chinese landscape during an era of great technological change, global exchange, and diversity in architecture, religions, and culture. On May 2, 2017, the artists and Velaslavasay had a handover ceremony in the auditorium of the Tiexiyu School, which provided the third and final studio location large enough to accommodate the painting size.

== Programs and events ==
Throughout the years, the Velaslavasay has hosted numerous events including book and poetry readings, illustrated lectures, musical performances and cinema showings and festivals.
