= New Society for Visual Arts =

German art association

The nGbK – neue Gesellschaft für bildende Kunst (lit. New Society for Visual Arts) is a German art association. It was founded in 1969 with a grassroots democratic structure and is, by its own account, one of the most important and largest associations of its kind in Germany. From 1992 to 2022, its exhibition rooms and office were located at Oranienstraße 25 in the Kreuzberg district of Berlin. Since August 2023, they have been located next to Alexanderplatz at Karl-Liebknecht-Straße 11/13 in the Mitte district. Annette Maechtel has headed the nGbK since 2020.

== History ==
The New Society for Visual Arts was created in 1969 after the dissolution of the German Society of Fine Arts.

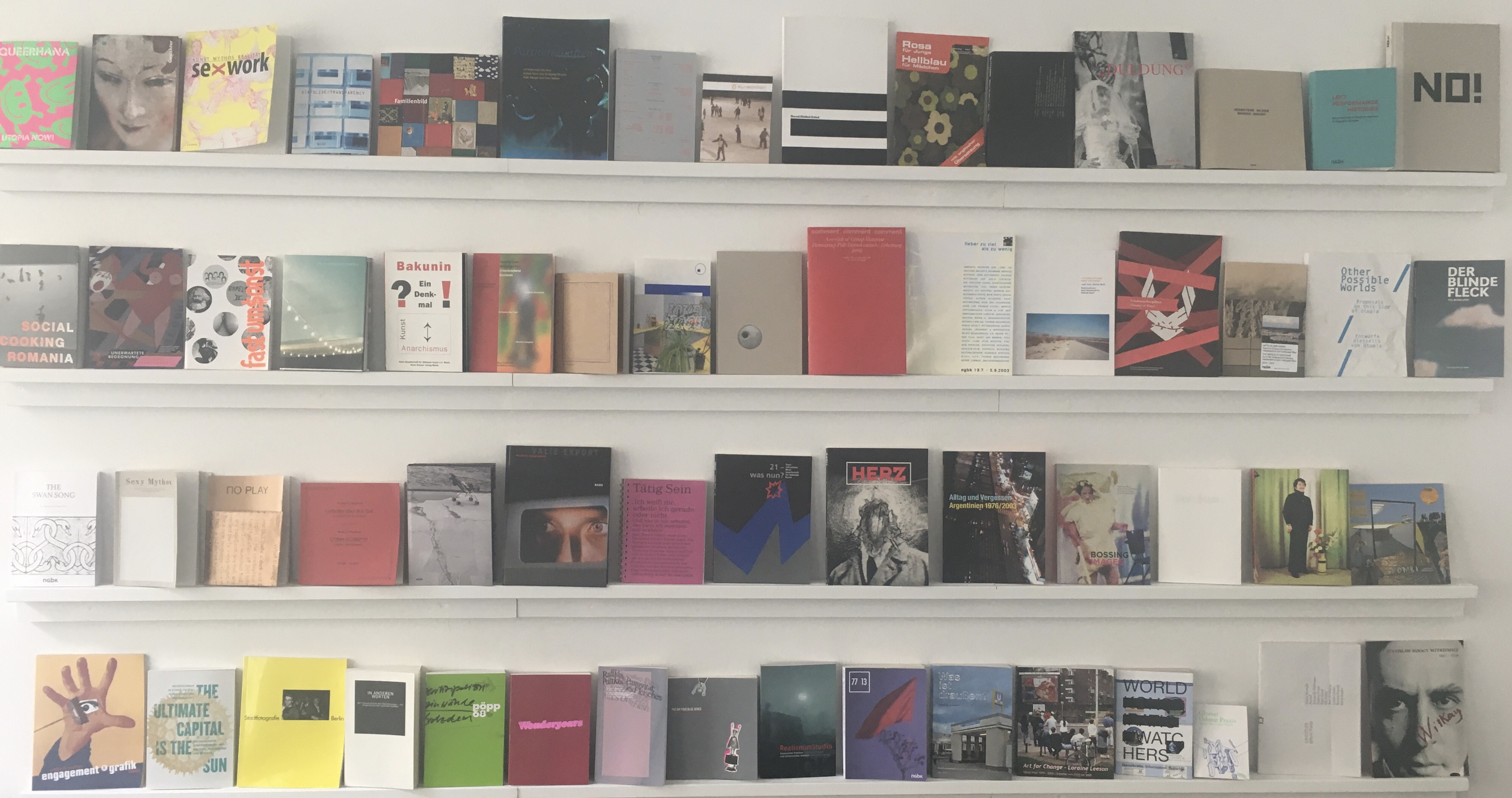
NGbK publications displayed

== Program ==
nGbK exhibition program is well known for its political and social engagement, as well as for being decided on through direct democratic way with votes of members on annual assemblies. Unlike most German art associations, nGbK members themselves (also with non-members) set up working groups of 5 or more and then submit projects to be presented and voted on. If an application is approved and project selected, it is executed in the next year program or for longterm projects in the next two years. nGbK working group losses its active status after the completion of the project. This basic principle distinguishes this from the other major German art associations, where usually the members have no direct influence on exhibition planning.

Before moving to its current headquarters at Oranienstraße 25 in Kreuzberg, the organization's exhibition space was at Tempelhofer Ufer 22.

Archived information of the projects and some of the publications are compiled and available online.

== Structure ==
- Presiding:
  - Ingo Arend, Katrin Busch, Çağla İlk and representatives of working groups
- Managing director:
  - Annette Maechtel, from January 2020
  - 2015–2019 (resigned) Lilian Engelmann
  - 2015 (interim director) Oliver Baurhenn
