= Panorama City, Los Angeles =

Panorama City
- Neighborhood of Los Angeles
- Location within Los Angeles/San Fernando Valley Panorama City (the Los Angeles metropolitan area)
- Coordinates: 34°13′29″N 118°26′56″W
- Country: United States
- State: California
- County: Los Angeles
- City: Los Angeles

Panorama City is a neighborhood in the city of Los Angeles, California, in the San Fernando Valley. It has a generally young age range as well as the highest population density in the Valley. More than half of the neighborhood's population was born abroad, the majority being from Mexico. Known as the Valley's first planned community after a transition from agriculture to a post–World War II housing boom, it has been home to several notable residents. It is now a mixture of single-family homes and low-rise apartment buildings.

Panorama City has three high schools, two recreational centers, a senior center, ice rink, two hospitals and a chamber of commerce.

== History ==
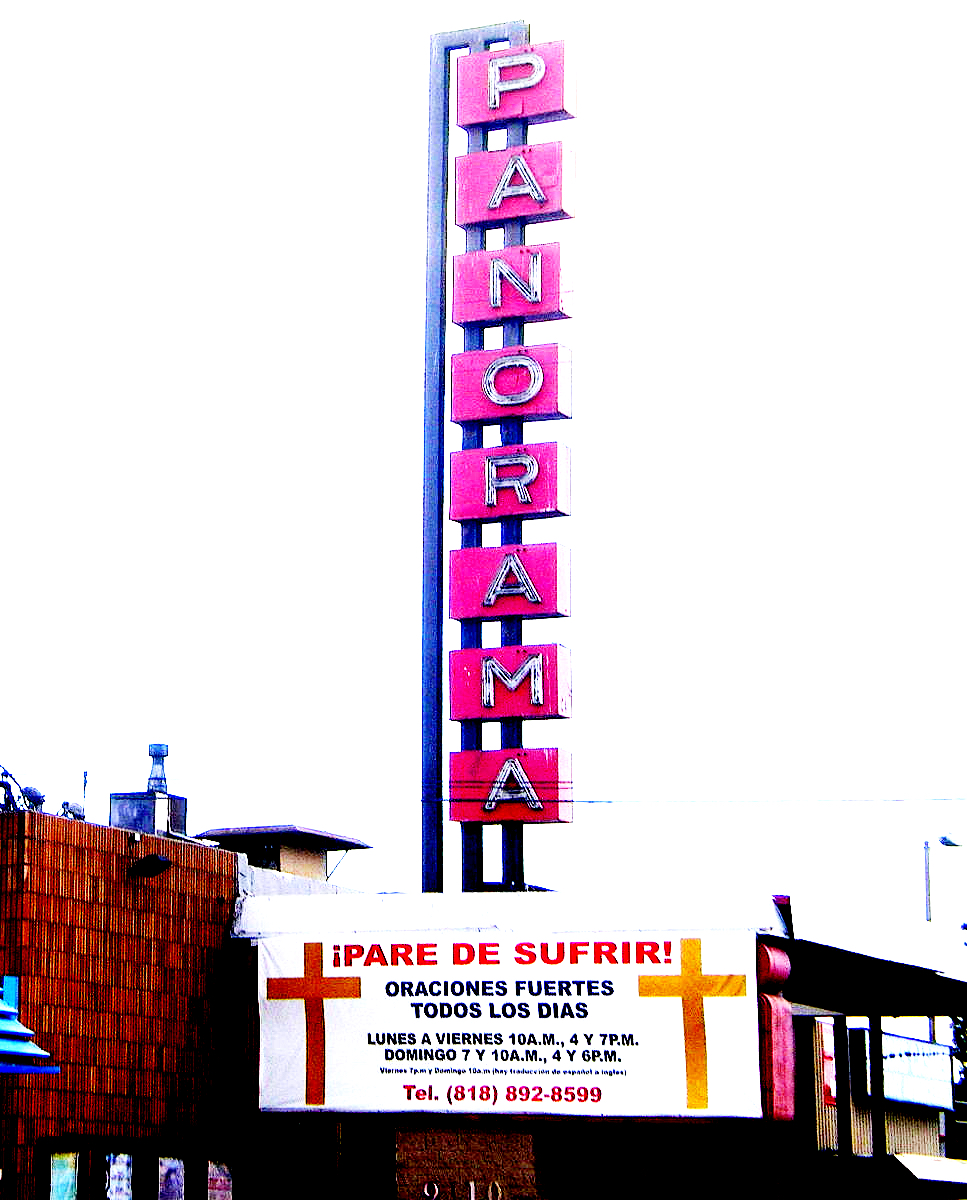
Former Panorama theater converted for church services, 2008

Panorama City is known as the San Fernando Valley's first planned community. In 1948, it was developed as such by residential developer Fritz B. Burns and industrialist Henry J. Kaiser. The master plan was created by architectural firm Wurdeman & Becket. Burns, seeing the tremendous potential fortune that could be made as large numbers of World War II veterans came home and started families, teamed up with Kaiser in 1945 to form Kaiser Community Homes. The vast majority of the houses were bought with loans issued by the Federal Housing Administration or the Servicemen's Readjustment Act of 1944, better known as the G.I. Bill.

Homes in the area were sold with racially discriminatory covenants. A "Conditions, Covenants, Restrictions" document filed with the county recorder declared that no Panorama City lot could be "used or occupied by any person whose blood is not entirely that of the white or Caucasian race." Such restrictive covenants, which sometimes also limited ownership to people "of the Christian faith," were then common in many communities at the time. Although rendered legally unenforceable by the Civil Rights Act of 1968, most of these documents have not been amended to remove the superfluous language.

De facto integration was accelerated by the Community Reinvestment Act of 1977. The CRA-insured credit was provided to the entire community without regard to race or income, causing white flight as with many other areas of the San Fernando Valley.

Panorama City was once adjacent to General Motors'. Today, the Van Nuys Assembly plant has been replaced with a large shopping center called The Plant. A mural on both sides of Van Nuys Boulevard, under the rail bridge across from the Van Nuys Station, pays homage to the glory years of the GM plant.

== Geography ==
Panorama City touches Mission Hills on the north, Arleta on the northeast, Sun Valley on the east, Valley Glen on the southeast, Van Nuys on the south and North Hills on the west.

== Demographics ==
The 2010 U.S. census counted 69,817 residents in the neighborhood's 91402 ZIP code. The median age was 30.1, and the median yearly household income at that time was US$41,467.

In 2008, the Los Angeles Times Mapping L.A. project described Panorama City as an area that was "moderately diverse" ethnically, with a high percentage of Latinos and a significant population of Filipinos. Filipinos and Mexicans were the most common ancestries in the neighborhood. At that time, the breakdown was Latinos, 70.1%; whites, 11.5%; Asians, 11.9%; blacks, 4.3%; and others, 2.2%. Mexico (52.1%) and El Salvador (13.4%) were the most common places of birth for the 55.0% of the residents who were born outside of the United States—a high percentage for Los Angeles.

As of the 2010 census, renters were occupying 64.8% of the housing stock, while owners held 35.2%.

There were 2,849 families headed by single parents. The rate of 20.2% was considered to be a high one. There were 1,837 veterans, or 4.3% of the population, a low percentage compared to the rest of the city and county.

== Parks and recreation ==
The Panorama Recreation Center is in the community. The center, which also functions as a Los Angeles Police Department drop-in facility, has an auditorium, a lighted baseball diamond, lighted outdoor basketball courts, a children's play area, a community room, an indoor gymnasium, picnic tables, and unlit tennis courts.

The Sepulveda Recreation Center is located in Panorama City. The center has two indoor gymnasiums, both of which can be used as auditoriums. The center also has a lighted baseball diamond, lighted indoor basketball courts, a children's play area, a community room, and lighted tennis courts. The Sepulveda Pool is an outdoor unheated seasonal pool in the Sepulveda center.

The Mid-Valley Senior Citizen Center is in Panorama City. The center has an auditorium, a kitchen, and a stage. The building was originally a convalescent home. As of July 2000 the former convalescent home was being converted into the senior center.

The LA Kings Valley Ice Center, formerly known as the Valley Skating Center is an ice rink facility located in Panorama City. The facility has two rinks, the "Freeze" rink to the north, and the "Glacier" rink to the south. The facility offers adult and youth ice hockey programs, learn to play programs, learn to skate for hockey and figure skating. The rink also has public stick times, public skating sessions, and freestyle sessions. Either rink is rentable for birthday parties or other events. Broomball is available if a rink is rented. The rink is home to the California Heat amateur hockey club, who compete in the Southern California Amateur Hockey Association (SCAHA), a league of the California Amateur Hockey Association, which is the largest youth league in the western United States.

== Government and infrastructure ==
The Panorama City Neighborhood Council is a city agency formed by volunteer elected officials and appointed officials. The purpose of the Panorama City Neighborhood Council is to provide an inclusive open forum for public discussion, and to serve as an advisory body on issues of concern to the Panorama City area and in the governance of the city of Los Angeles. The Council gained its official city role upon certification by the Board Of Neighborhood Commissioners on March 15, 2007.

Metro and LADOT operates fixed-route transit bus service in Panorama City. Metro Rapid line 761 operates on Van Nuys Boulevard. Metro Local lines 152, 158, 166, 167, 169, and 233 operate the community. LADOT operates DASH bus service on their Panorama City/Van Nuys route. In 2027, Metro will open the East San Fernando Valley Light Rail Transit Project light rail project with stations on Van Nuys Boulevard at Nordhoff Street and Roscoe Boulevard.

=== Representation ===
- California's 29th congressional district
- California's 20th State Senate district
- California's 46th State Assembly district
- Panorama City Chamber of Commerce
- Los Angeles City Council District 6
- Panorama City Neighborhood Council

== Economics ==
Panorama City was the largest center of major retail outlets in the San Fernando Valley, starting with the opening of what would later become the Panorama Mall in 1955. At the time, this small complex included The Broadway and five other stores. Three other major department stores — Ohrbachs, J. W. Robinson's and Montgomery Ward – opened nearby over the next ten years, and they were marketed collectively as the Panorama City Shopping Center. By the 1970s, the area had lost business to nearby communities. The freestanding Ohrbach's building, designed by the architectural firm Welton Becket and Associates, is significant in that it represents "an early and important phase of commercial development" in the neighborhood. It is now the site of the Valley Indoor Swap Meet.

The Panorama Mall remains an important local mall, with a Walmart discount store.

== Education ==
Thirteen percent of Panorama City residents aged 25 and older had earned a four-year degree by 2000, an average percentage for both the city and the county. The percentage of the same-age residents with less than a high school diploma was high for the county.

Schools within the Panorama City boundaries are:

=== Public ===
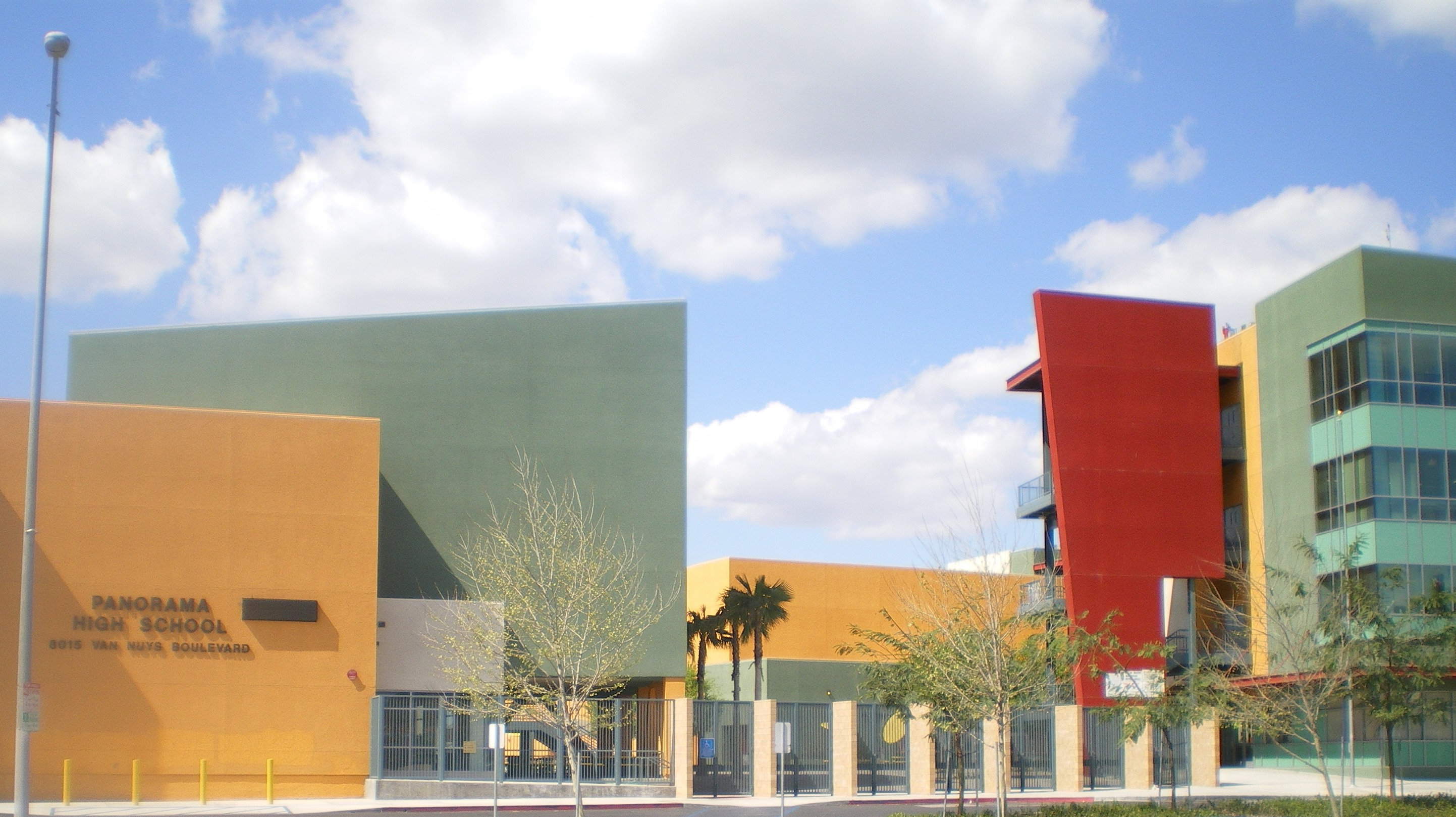
Panorama High School in 2008

- Panorama High School, 8015 Van Nuys Blvd.
- Liggett Street Elementary School, 9373 Moonbeam Avenue
- Primary Academy for Success, elementary, 9075 Willis Avenue
- Valor Academy Elementary School, 8755 Woodman Avenue
- Panorama City Elementary School, 8600 Kester Avenue
- Chase Street Elementary School, 14041 Chase Street
- Vista Middle School, 15040 Roscoe Boulevard
- Burton Street Elementary School, 8111 Calhoun Avenue
- Cal Burke High School, continuation, 14630 Lanark Street
- Ranchito Avenue Elementary School, 7940 Ranchito Avenue
- Michelle Obama Elementary School, 8150 Cedros Avenue
- Alta California Elementary School, 14839 Rayen St

=== Private ===
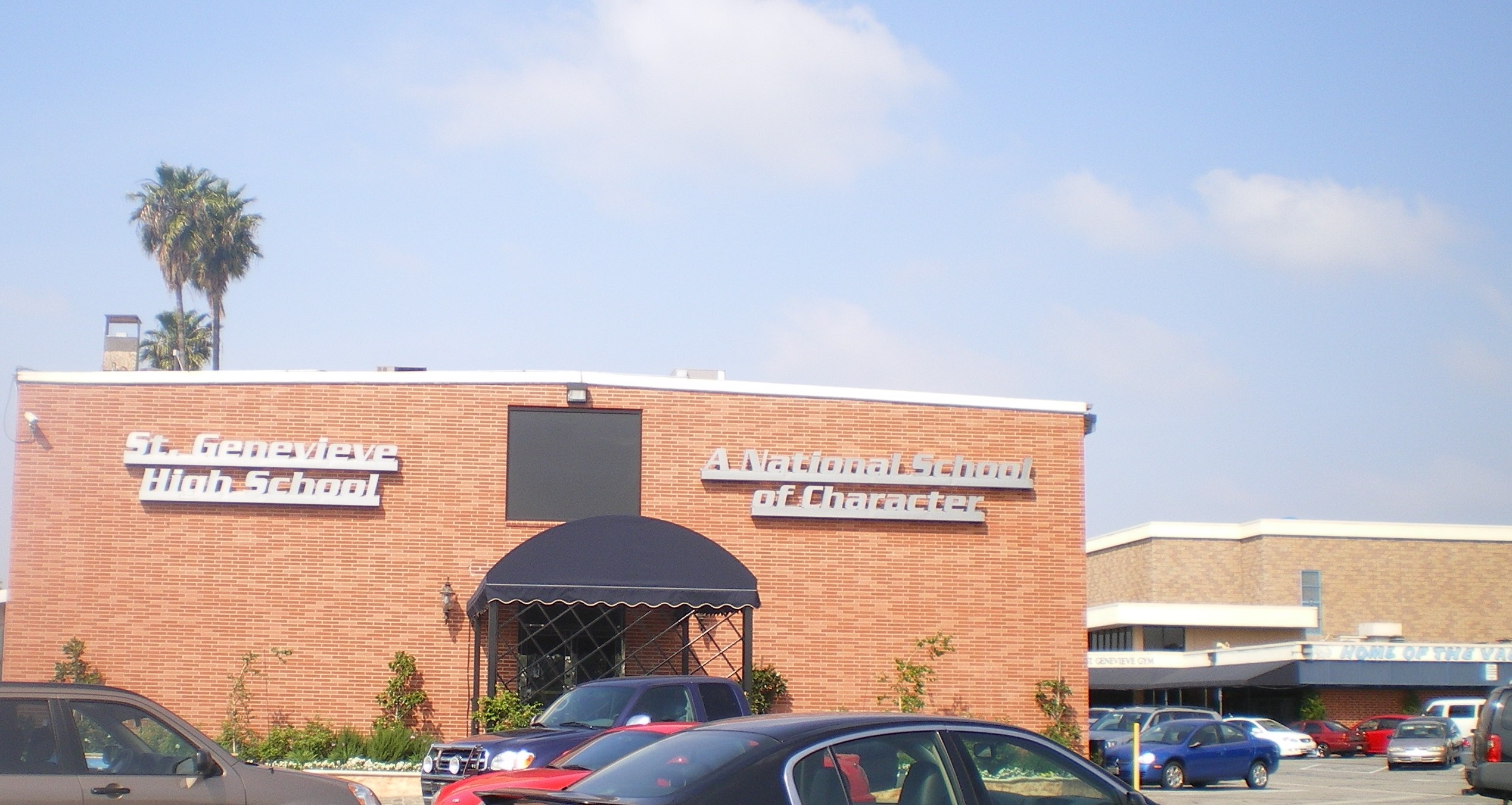
St. Genevieve High School, 2008

- St. Genevieve Elementary School, 14024 Community Street
- St. Genevieve High School, 13967 Roscoe Boulevard

== Healthcare ==
Kaiser Permanente has a hospital and medical center complex on Woodman Avenue and Roscoe Boulevard serving the central and eastern San Fernando Valley.

== Notable people ==
- José Benavidez, boxer
- Jeremy Bischoff, artistic gymnast
- Zack Britton, Major League Baseball (MLB) player
- Candace Cameron Bure, actress
- Kirk Cameron, actor and Christian evangelist
- Josue Cartagena, soccer player
- Terry Gilliam, Monty Python member and film director
- Meagan Good, actress
- Mark-Paul Gosselaar, actor
- Hopsin, rapper
- Angela Ruggiero, women's ice hockey player, Gold medalist
- Mike Shinoda, musician
- David Smith, volleyball player and Olympian
- Giancarlo Stanton, MLB player
- Sara Velas, artist
- Steve Wapnick, MLB player

== See also ==
- Van Nuys Boulevard
