= Sara Velas =

Artist and curator

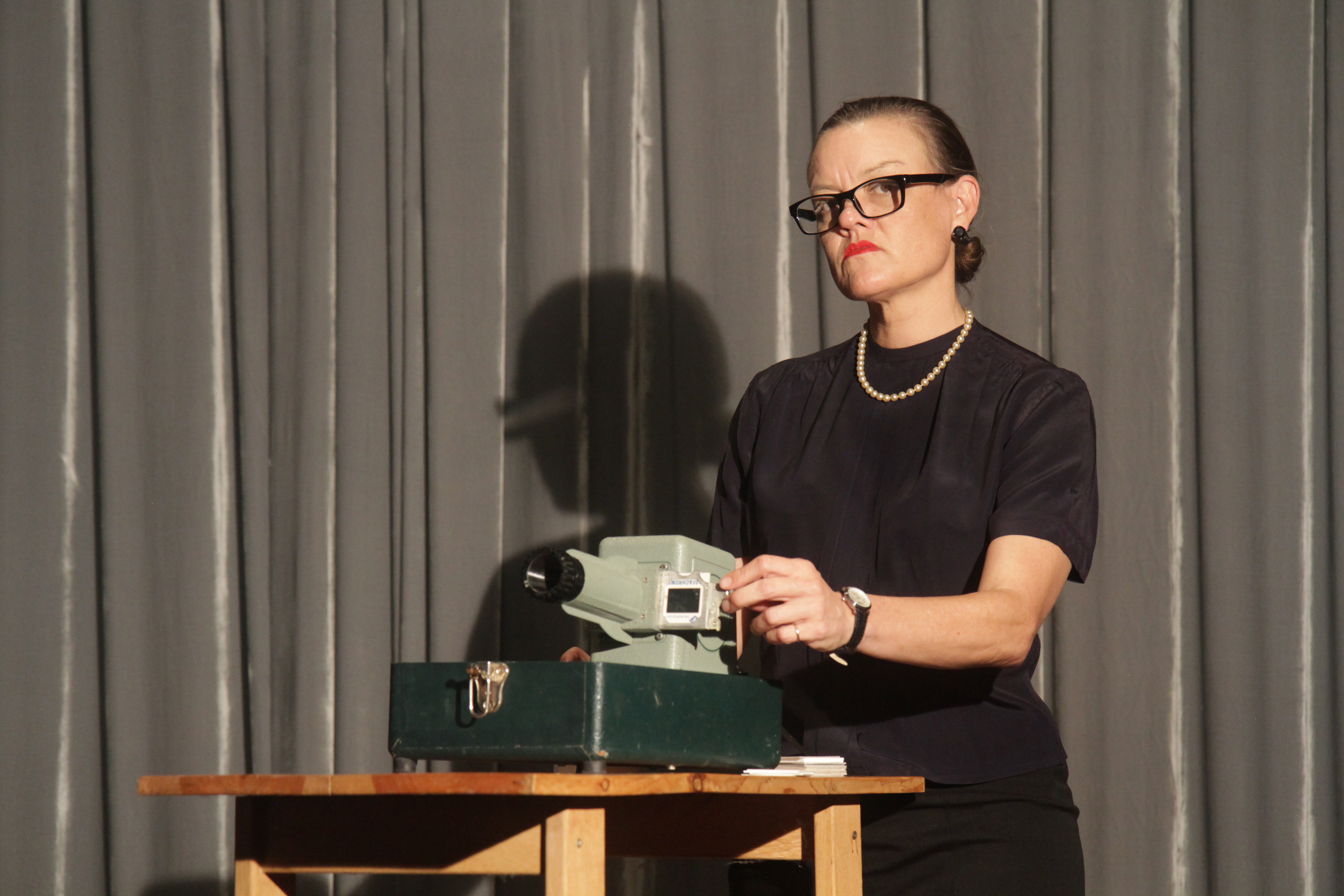

Sara Velas is an artist, graphic designer, gardener, curator and Artistic Director of the Velaslavasay Panorama in Los Angeles, CA, US.

== Biography ==
Born in Panorama City, Velas studied the panoramic painting style while a student at the Sam Fox School of Design & Visual Arts at Washington University in St. Louis, where she received her BFA in Painting. Velas’ interest in panoramas goes back to her days as an art student. She was researching the 1904 St. Louis World’s Fair and became aware of the panorama paintings that entertained people there. In 2000, she founded the Velaslavasay Panorama in Los Angeles, CA. Velas also served as the president of the International Panorama Council from 2014 to 2017, which meets annually to discuss the panoramic medium both historically and contemporarily and currently serves as Co-President with Molly Briggs.

When interviewed in 2016 for the journal Museum Futures, Velas noted that: “A few times, I suppose I’ve not been the ideal interviewee because folks would ask me ‘Now that you’ve done this, what would you like to have happen?’ Getting at a higher pinpointed truth or ‘secret meaning.’ My genuine answer is that I want to keep working on it, tending to it and aligning its growth- similar to a garden (and also literally a garden).” Ms. Velas was featured twice on episodes of Visiting… With Huell Howser for her work with the Velaslavasay Panorama (2001 & 2011). An avid architectural preservationist, in 2002 Sara Velas co-authored with fellow Modcom (Los Angeles Conservancy) member Meri Pritchett the first nomination in the United States to successfully grant cultural historic preservation status (LA Historic Cultural Monument #736)to a trailer park, the Monterey Trailer Park in Highland Park.
