= Julia deVille =

New Zealand artist

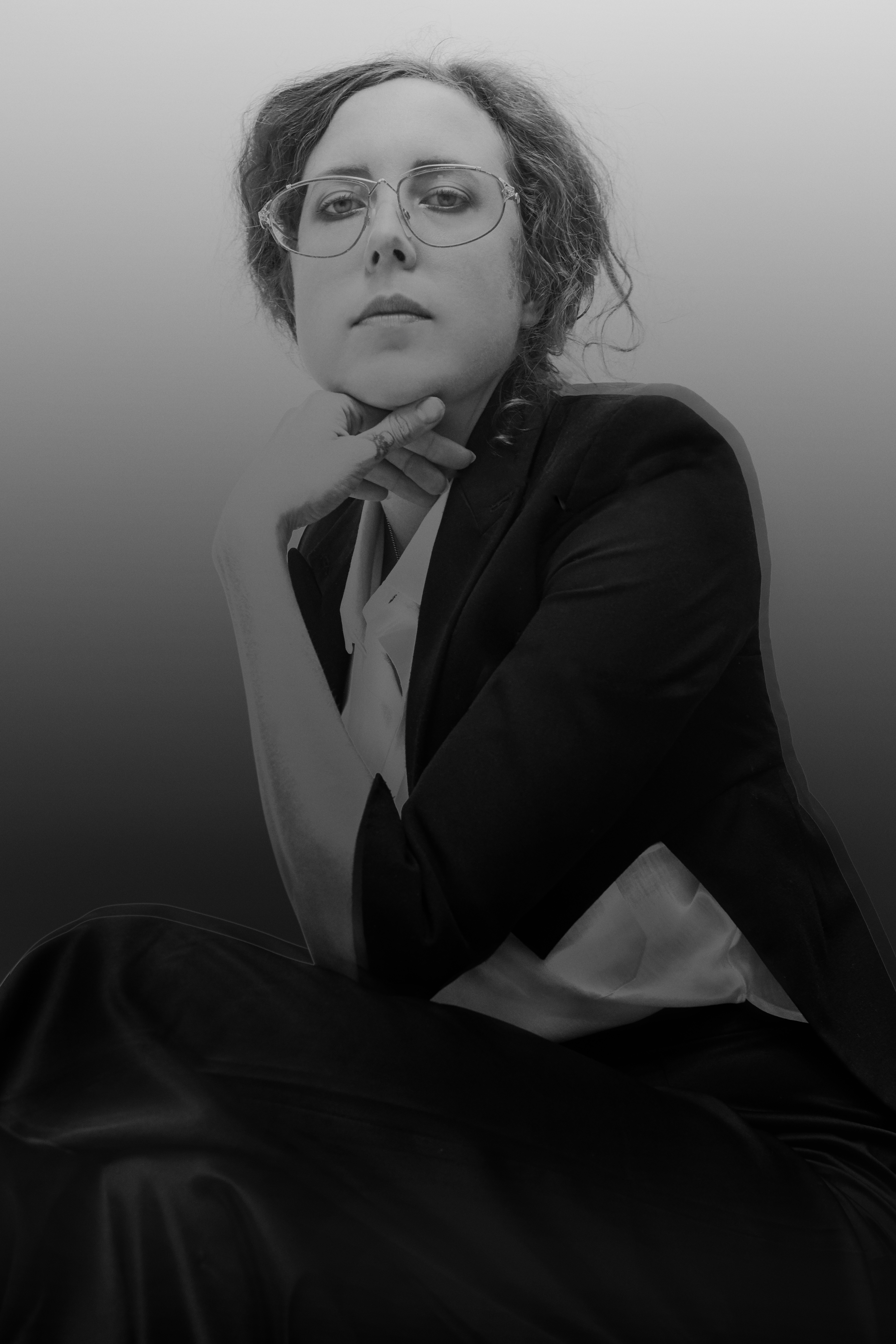
- Born: Wellington, New Zealand
- Education: Advanced Diploma in Gold and Silversmithing, North Melbourne Institute of TAFE
- Occupations: Artist; jeweller
- Website: www.juliadeville.com

Julia deVille is a New Zealand-born artist, jeweller and taxidermist, who only uses subjects in her taxidermy that have died of natural causes. She lives and works in Australia.

== Early life and education ==
Julia deVille was born in Wellington, New Zealand. She studied fashion for one year at Massey University and then moved to Melbourne in 2001 to study shoe making/design at RMIT. DeVille enrolled in two short jewellery courses in late 2002, at the same time she met her taxidermy mentor and started learning the craft of taxidermy.

She enrolled in the Advanced Diploma in Gold and Silversmithing from 2003 to 2004.

== Career ==
DeVille only uses subjects in her taxidermy that have died of natural causes. She is an advocate for animal rights, and began including taxidermy in her art work in 2002, combining it with her jewellery making practice to produce small sculptures and installations. DeVille’s interest in memento mori traditions of the fifteenth to eighteenth centuries and Victorian mourning jewellery inform her wearable pieces. Her works are featured in galleries across Australia, including the Museum of Old and New Art in Hobart and the National Gallery of Victoria in Melbourne.

== Awards ==
- 2017: Winner, Sidney Myer Creative Fellowship, Sidney Myer Fund & The Myer Foundation
- 2016: Winner, Waterhouse Natural Science Art Prize, with Neapolitan Bonbonaparte
- 2016: Finalist, Deakin University Contemporary Small Sculpture Award, Deakin University Art Gallery, Melbourne.
- 2015: Finalist, Kennedy Prize, Kennedy Arts Foundation, Adelaide. Finalist, National Self-Portrait Prize, UQ Art Museum, Brisbane. Finalist, Gold Coast Art Prize, Gold Coast City Gallery, Queensland. Finalist, Manning Art Prize, Manning Regional Art Gallery, New South Wales. Finalist, Woollahra Small Sculpture Prize, Sydney. Finalist, Victorian Craft Award, Craft Victoria, Melbourne
- 2014: Winner, Scope Galleries Award, Victoria
- 2013: Winner, Woollahra Small Sculpture Prize, Sydney. Winner, Vermont Award, Wallace Art Awards. Finalist, City of Hobart Art Prize, Hobart. Finalist, Wilson Art Award, New South Wales
- 2012: Winner, City of Hobart Art Prize, Hobart
- 2011: Viewer’s Choice Winner, Woollahra Small Sculpture Prize, Sydney

== Selected exhibitions ==
=== Solo ===
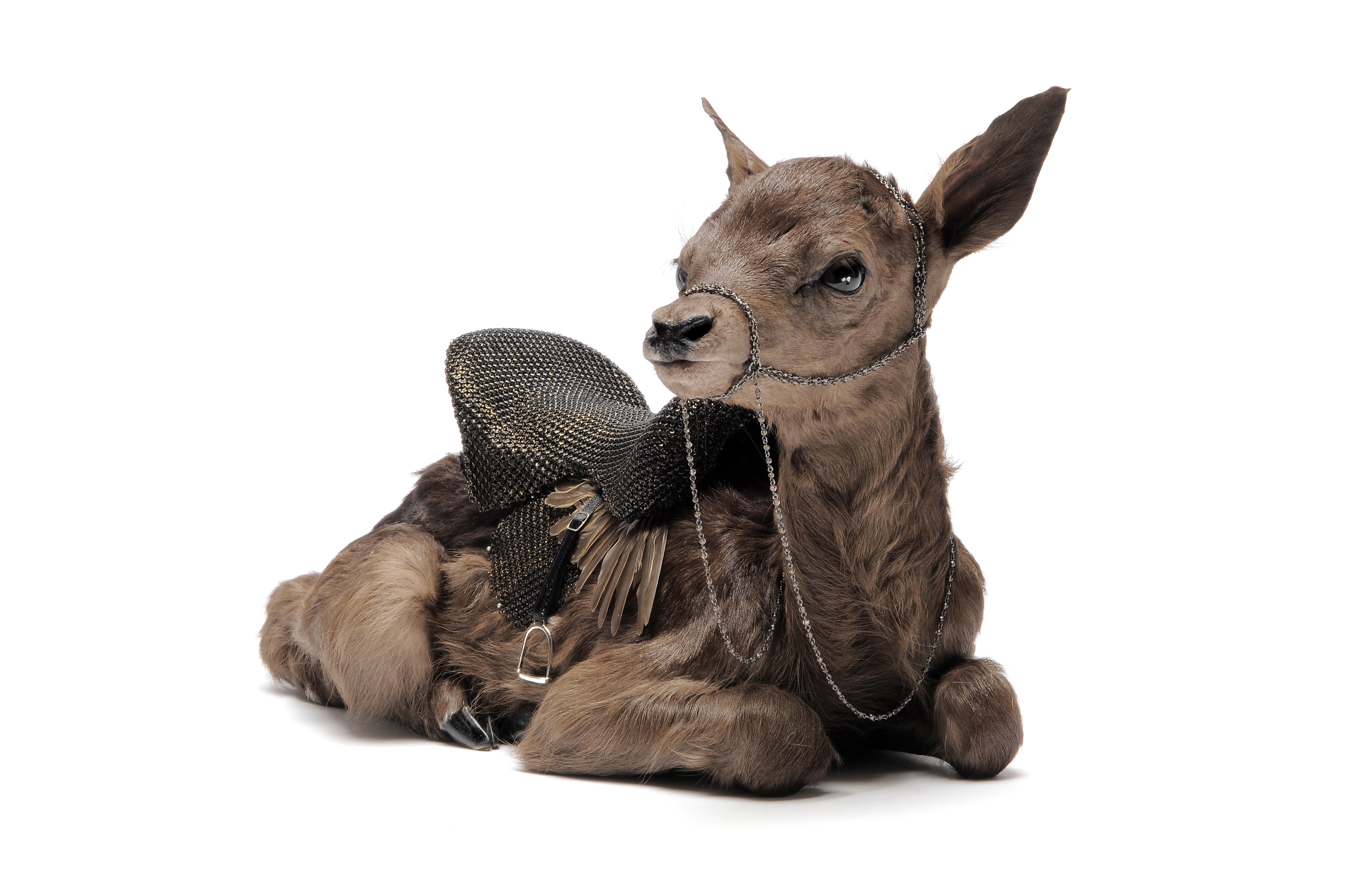
'Actaeon' (taxidermy fawn with chainmail saddle, sparrow wings, smoky quartz and silver reins and harness and sterling silver stirrups) made by Julia deVille for her 2010 exhibition 'Night's Plutonian Shore' at Sophie Gannon Gallery - Melbourne

- 2018: Wholeness and the Implicit Order, New Linden Gallery, Melbourne
- 2015: Lullaby, Jan Murphy Gallery, Brisbane
- 2014: Phantasmagoria, Sophie Gannon Gallery, Melbourne
- 2013: Degustation, National Gallery of Victoria, Melbourne
- 2013: For days unnumbered, Jan Murphy Gallery, Brisbane
- 2012: Sarcophagus, Sophie Gannon Gallery, Melbourne
- 2011: Nevermore, JamFactory, Adelaide
- 2010: Night’s Plutonian Shore, Sophie Gannon Gallery, Melbourne
- 2010: Julia deVille, Aesop stores, London
- 2009: Cineraria, Sophie Gannon Gallery, Melbourne
- 2008: Ossuarium, Craft Victoria, Melbourne
- 2008: Prey, Eastern Market, Melbourne
- 2008: Memento Mori, Dowse Art Museum, Lower Hutt, New Zealand
- 2008: Élan Vital, e.g.etal Galleries, Melbourne
- 2006: Vivere Disce, Cogita Mori, Fat 3000, GPO, Melbourne
- 2006: Here I Lie And Wait For Thee, e.g.etal galleries, Victoria
- 2005: Disce Mori, Tsubi flagship store, New York
- 2005: Puluis et Umbra Sumus, e.g.etal galleries & Workshop 3000 window, Melbourne

=== Group ===
- 2016: Lorne Sculpture Biennale, Lorne Foreshore, Victoria.
- 2015: Fantastic Worlds, Rockhampton Art Gallery, Queensland. Return to Hanging Rock, Mulberry Hill, Victoria. Kennedy Prize, Kennedy Arts Foundation, Adelaide. National Self-Portrait Prize, UQ Art Museum, Brisbane. Gold Coast Art Prize, Gold Coast City Gallery, Queensland. Woollahra Small Sculpture Prize, Woollahra Council Chambers, Sydney. Manning Art Prize, Manning Regional Art Gallery, New South Wales. Storm in a Teacup, Mornington Peninsula Regional Gallery, Victoria. Victorian Craft Award, Craft Victoria, Melbourne.
- 2014: Phantasmagoria, Art Gallery of South Australia, dark heart: Adelaide Biennale of Australian Art, Adelaide. Sophie Gannon Gallery, Melbourne Art Fair, Melbourne. Scope Galleries Art Award, Scope Galleries, Victoria. Domestic Bliss, Deakin University Art Gallery, Melbourne.
- 2013: Melbourne Now, National Gallery of Victoria, Melbourne. Contemporary Voices, The Fine Art Society, London. Jan Murphy Gallery, Sydney Contemporary Art Fair, Sydney. Sophie Gannon Gallery, Sydney Contemporary Art Fair, Sydney. Diorama, Wollongong City Gallery, Victoria. Second Nature, PM Gallery & House, London. Wonderworks, The Cat Street Gallery, Hong Kong.
- 2012: Small Works, Jan Murphy Gallery, Brisbane. Theatre of the World, Museum of Old and New Art (MONA), Hobart. Unexpected Pleasures, Design Museum, London.
- 2011: Tinker Tailor Soldier Sailor, Gallery Artisan, Brisbane. Lugosi’s Children, Objectspace, Auckland. Wattle: Australian Contemporary Art, The Cat Street Gallery, Hong Kong.
