= Lisa Black (sculptor) =

New Zealand artist

- Born: 1982 (age 43–44); Australia
- Known for: Sculptor; Jeweller
- Notable work: Fixed Animals; Departed Skulls
- Movement: Mixed metal media

Lisa Black (born 1982) is a sculpture artist and jeweller based in Auckland, New Zealand. Her work often combines taxidermied animals and preserved insects with found metal and sometimes working mechanical parts, and has been described as "Steampunk" art, although she does not use the term herself. She self categorizes her work by adding "Fixed" to the titles of her pieces made to look living, and "Departed" to the pieces made to look deceased. The first work in the Fixed series was Fixed Fawn. Her work has been featured in Marie Claire Magazine, The New Zealand Herald, and the television show New Zealand's Next Top Model.

== Taxidermy works ==
=== Fixed series ===
A series of sculptures using taxidermied animals and metal parts from different eras.

- Fixed Mammals, including Fixed Fawn, Fixed Golden Fawn, Fixed Ferret and Fixed Rat.
- Fixed Reptiles, including Fixed Crocodile and Fixed Turtle.
- Fixed Birds, including Fixed Duckling Head and Fixed Black Bird.
- Fixed Pheasant Wings, a taxidermy work not part of the other series.

=== Departed series ===
A series of sculptures using the taxidermied skulls of animals and metal parts.

== Jewelry ==
- Gilded Butterflies necklaces

== Selected exhibitions ==
- 2012 'Rogue Taxidermy', La Luz de Jesus Gallery Hollywood, California
- 2011 Museo Civico di Zoologia Rome, Italy
- 2011 STRYCHNIN Gallery Berlin, Germany
- 2011 Simon James Design, Auckland, New Zealand
- 2010 Century Guild Gallery/San Diego Comic-Con, San Diego, USA
- 2009 Century Guild Gallery/San Diego Comic-Con, San Diego, USA
- 2009 'Creature Discomforts', The Suter Gallery, Nelson, New Zealand
- 2008 Satellite Gallery, Auckland, New Zealand
