= 1804 in birding and ornithology =

- Years in birding and ornithology: 1801 1802 1803 1804 1805 1806 1807
- Centuries: 18th century · 19th century · 20th century
- Decades: 1770s 1780s 1790s 1800s 1810s 1820s 1830s
- Years: 1801 1802 1803 1804 1805 1806 1807

The year 1804 in birding and ornithology.

== Events ==
- Jean Hermann ( Johannis Hermann) published Observationes Zoologicae : quibus novae complures, aliaeque animalium species describuntur et illustrantur Argentorati : Amandum Koenig
- Pope Pius VII established Gabinetto di Zoologia dell'Università Pontificia a natural history museum in Rome.
- Georges-Louis Leclerc, Comte de Buffon's Histoire naturelle générale et particulière commenced in 1749, completed, sixteen years after his death. It was translated into many European languages and in various forms as Suites à Buffon. Nine of the volumes are devoted to birds.
- Frédéric Cuvier begins Dictionnaire des Sciences naturelles, dans lequel on traite méthodiquement des differens Êtres de la Nature ...Par plusiers Professors du Muséum National d'Histoire Naturelle et des autres principales Écoles de Paris. Strasbourg (Levrault)Paris (Le Normant) 1804, 1805–1806 suspended until 1816

== Ornithologists ==
=== Births ===
- Hermann Schlegel (10 June 1804 – 17 January 1884)
