= 1802 in birding and ornithology =

- Johann Matthäus Bechstein Ornithologisches Taschenbuch 1802–1803.
- Matthew Flinders discovered the Kangaroo Island emu
- George Montagu publishes Ornithogical Dictionary; or Alphabetical Synopsis of British Birds
- Louis Dufresne popularized the use of arsenical soap for preserving birds in an article in Nouveau dictionnaire d'histoire naturelle a technique which had enabled the Muséum to build the greatest collection of birds in the world.
- John Latham published Supplementum Indicis Ornithologici, sive Systematis Ornithologiae. In this work he scientifically describes the noisy miner, the white-tailed tropicbird, the azure kingfisher, the rufous whistler and the scarlet honeyeater amongst many other birds.
- The white-naped honeyeater described by Louis Pierre Vieillot and Jean Baptiste Audebert in Oiseaux dorés, ou à reflets métalliques
