= 1805 in birding and ornithology =

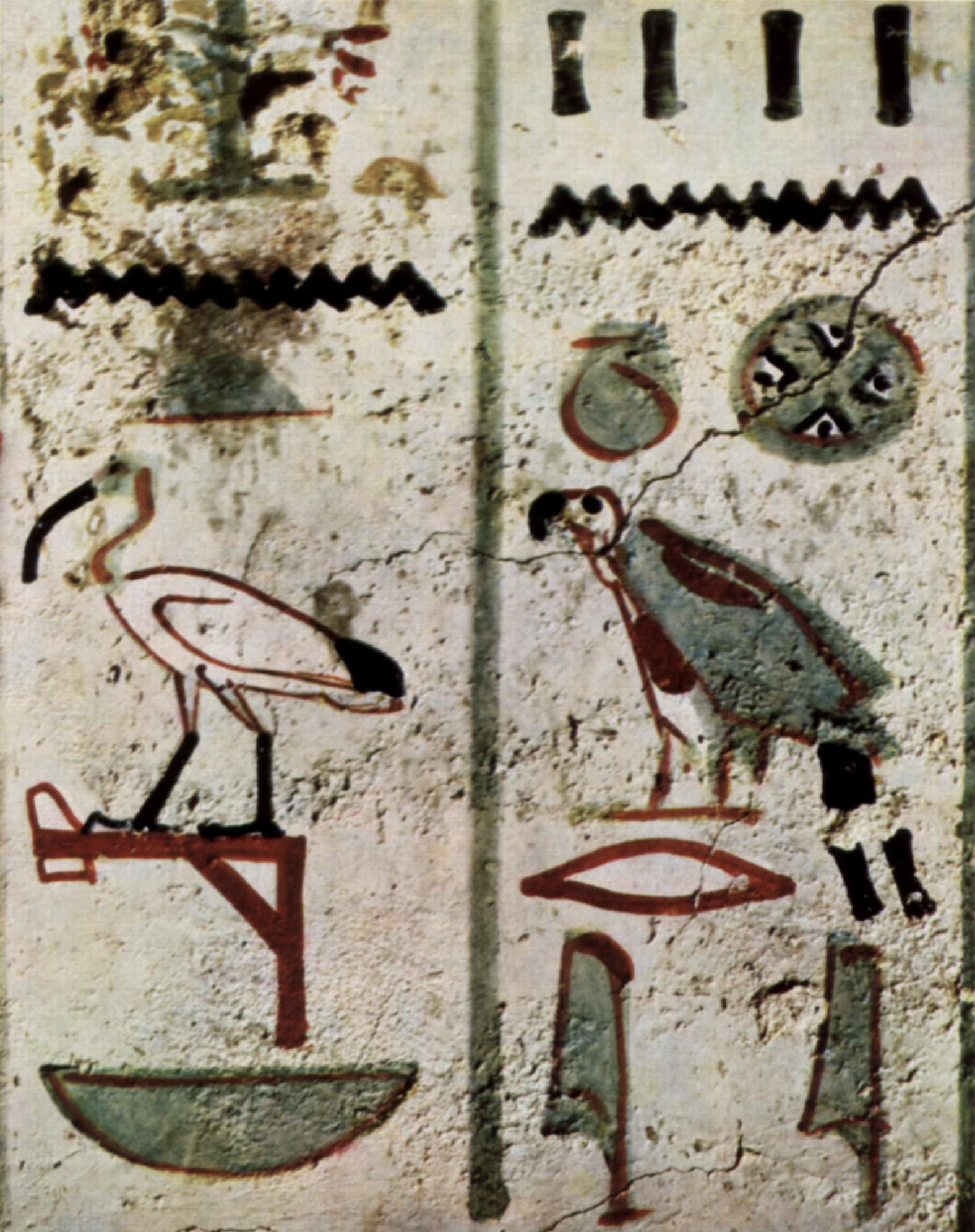
Sacred ibis hieroglyph

- The entomologist Gustaf von Paykull described the crab plover in Kongl. Vetenskaps Akademiens Handlingar Stockholm
- Marie Jules César Savigny published an account of the sacred ibis titled Histoire naturelle et mythologique de l'ibis
- King Island emu became extinct in the wild.
- Eugenius Johann Christoph Esper became professor of zoology and director of the zoology museum at Erlangen university.
- Johann Gotthelf Fischer von Waldheim founded the Société Impériale des Naturalistes de Moscou.
- Anselme Gaëtan Desmarest published Histoire Naturelle des Tangaras, des Manakins et des Todiers

== Ongoing events ==
Louis Pierre Vieillot Histoire naturelle des plus beaux oiseaux chanteur de la zone torride Birds described in this work in 1805 include the black-bellied seedcracker, the orange weaver and the black-necked weaver
