= Conservation and restoration of fur objects =

The conservation and restoration of fur objects is the preservation and protection of objects made from or containing fur. These pieces can include personal items like fur clothing or objects of cultural heritage that are housed in museums and collections. When dealing with the latter, a conservator-restorer often handles their care, whereas, for the public, professional furriers can be found in many neighborhoods.

== Definition of types of fur objects ==
=== Pelts ===
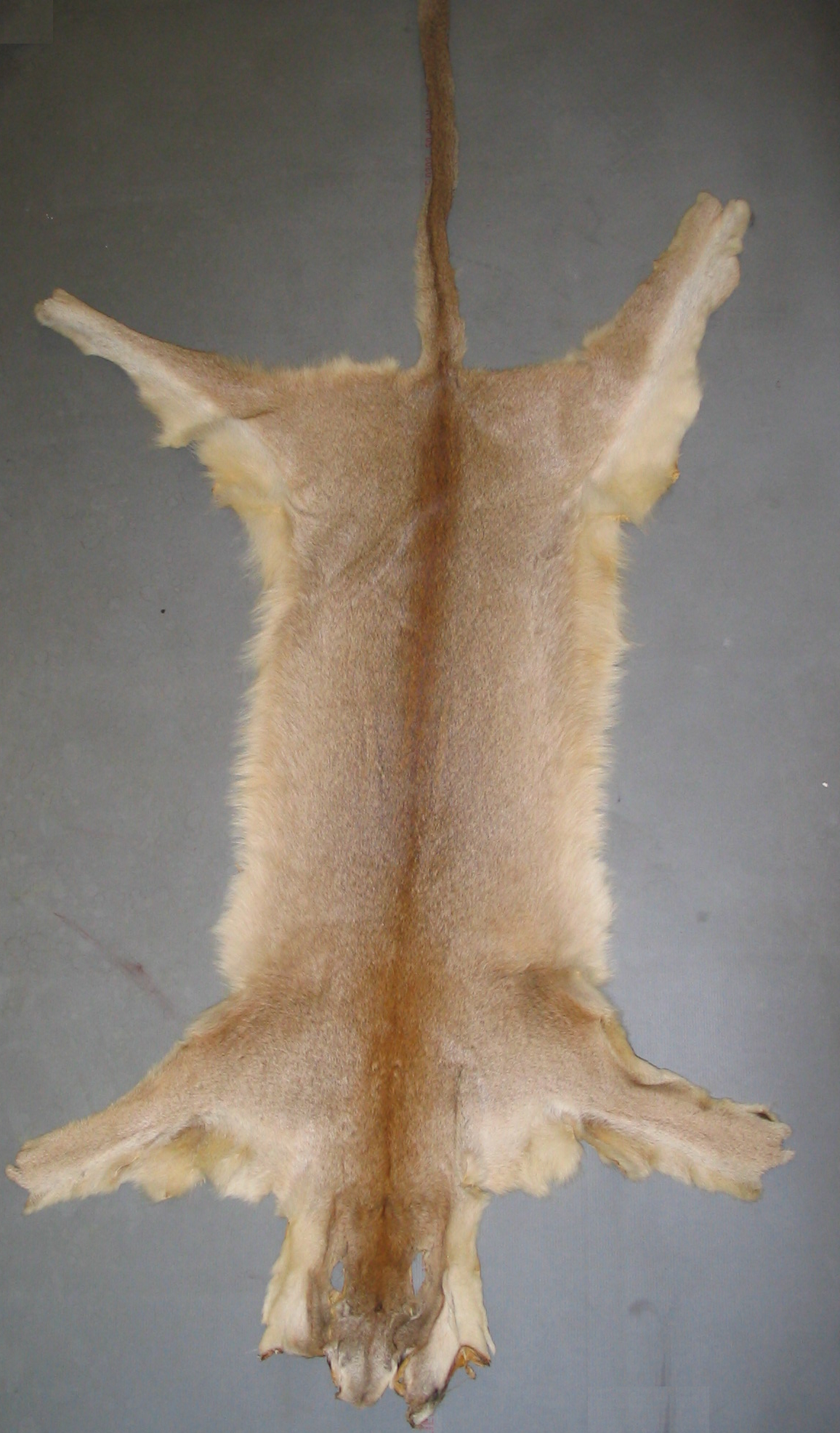
Puma pelt

Pelts are defined as the skin of an animal that still has the hair or fur intact. Animals used for traditional fur objects alternate between a winter and summer coat. The winter coats of animals are normally more desirable because they are thicker and fuller than the summer coats. The pelts are removed from the animal in a process of skinning and fleshing that removes all the tissue from the skin and pelt. The pelts are then cured and tanned to kill bacteria and create a stable material. Pelts are traditionally used to create clothing and home accessories like rugs, they can be mounted to create trophies or taxidermy specimens, or they can be sold and kept as is.

==== Differences between hair and fur ====
The only difference between hair and fur is semantics. Technically, both are made from keratin, which is also the protein that makes up skin, feathers, nails, hooves, claws, and horns.

"The way I think a lot of people understand fur versus hair is in the density of follicles," says Ross McPhee, Curator of the Department of Mammalogy at the American Museum of Natural History. "So for fur-bearing animals—which were converted into coats and so-forth—people always wanted it to be something that was very dense, so there's the idea therefore that fur is dense, and it certainly is in [the] kinds of fur-bearers that we use for this purpose. Whereas hair is not so dense. There's less of it."

This remains untrue however, because the human head has as the same "follicle density" as a mouse, but it just so happens to be genetically predisposed to stop at the head and not continue down the body. There are three types of hair: ground hair, guard hair, and whiskers. "Ground hair is used primarily as insulation and is soft, while guard hair is for protection from the elements and tends to be coarse." Both ground hair and guard hair are classified as fur. Because human hair acts as both, it can technically be called "fur". In reality, the keratin fibers that are described variously as hair, wool, or fur, depending on the animal type, are all referring to the same thing.

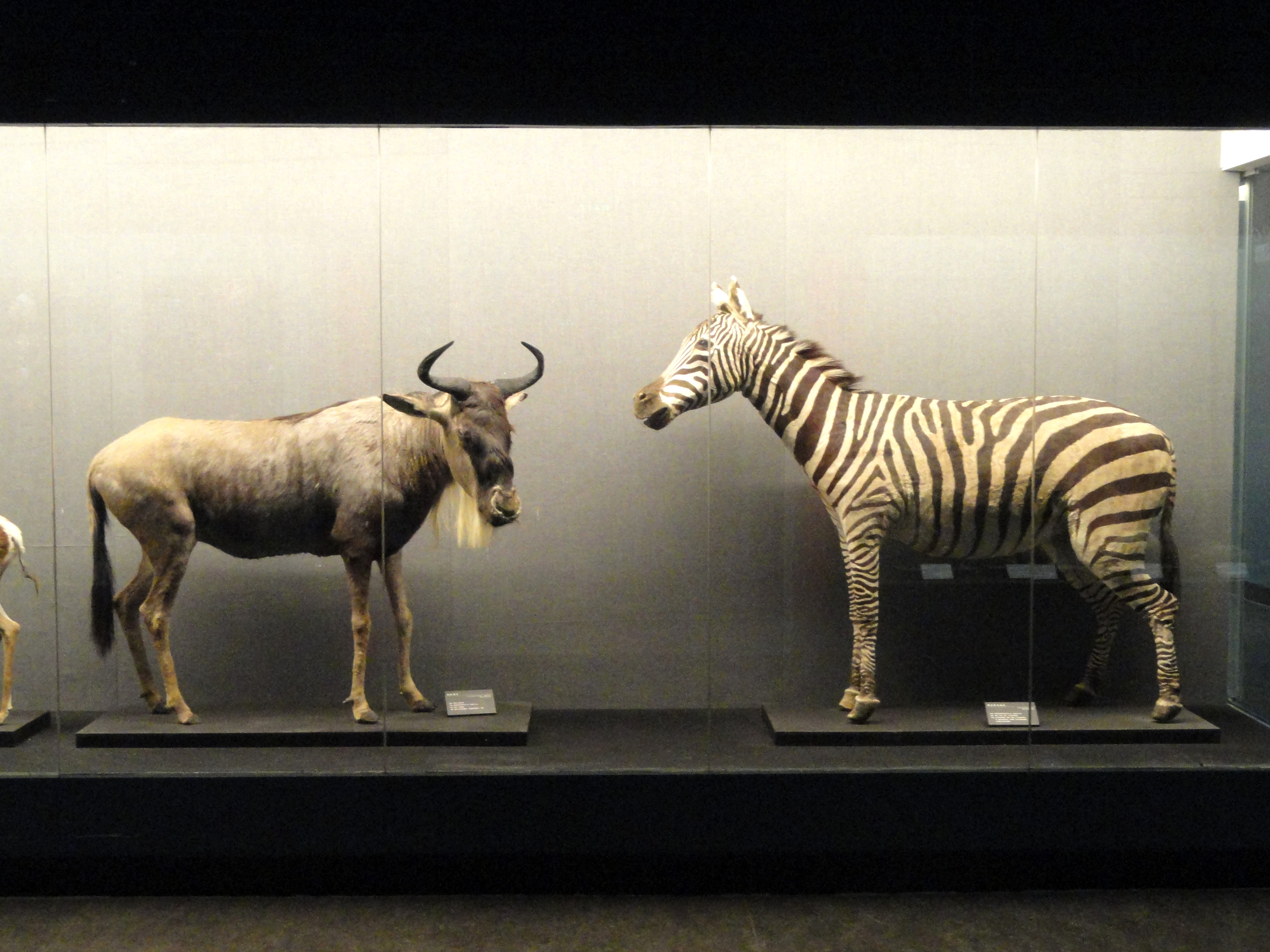
Taxidermy animals at the Kunming Natural History Museum of Zoology

=== Taxidermy specimens ===
Taxidermy has been around since the times of the Ancient Egyptians. While more mummification than traditional taxidermy, the Egyptians still preserved animals in their form by removing the innards and drying the carcass with salts from the Nile to dehydrate and preserve. The earliest known pieces of modern taxidermy are from the beginning of the sixteenth century, when the development and perfection of taxidermic techniques were linked to Western Europe's fascination with the natural world. Through the ages, taxidermy has progressed. During the Victorian era, taxidermy became closer to what is seen in museums today. There was a transition from using straw, paper, and other materials to create the mountings for the hides to using internal structures with rods and the actual animal skulls. Taxidermy is still used in museums and collections today. Most notable is the work of Carl Akeley, who modernized the idea of including taxidermied specimens in recreations of their natural habitats.

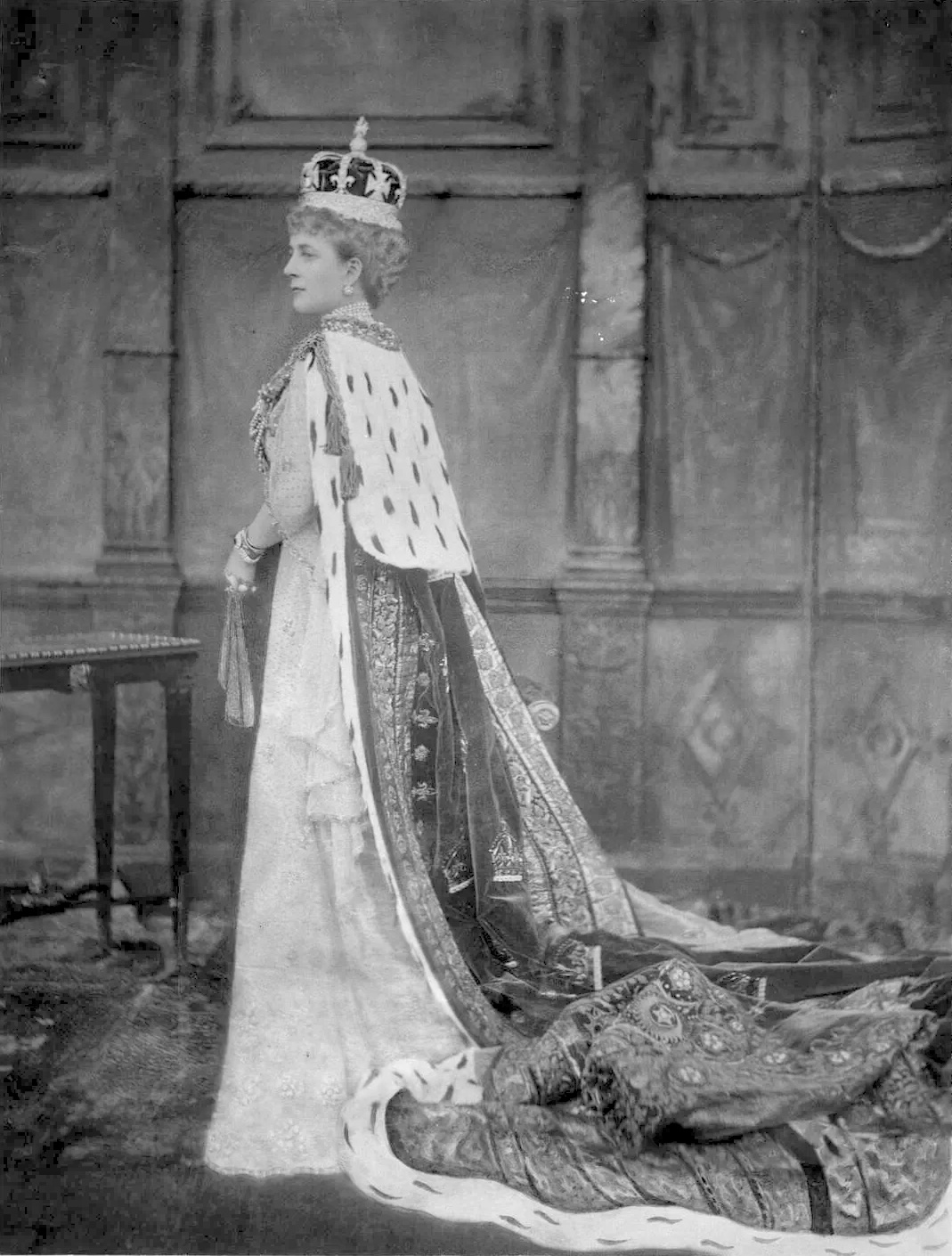
Alexandra of Denmark with an ermine robe

=== Clothing and accessories ===
Human beings have been wearing fur since the beginning of time. There is evidence that Ötzi, the Iceman, was wearing a pelt when he met his demise 5000 years ago. In classic antiquity, the ancient Egyptians, Phoenicians, Assyrians, Greeks, and Romans all used fur or pelts in clothing. In Western Europe, beginning in the 11th century, luxury furs such as ermine, mink, sable, and chinchilla were reserved for the royalty, nobility, high ranking clergy, and the bourgeoisie. Fur and the access to it became a way of sublimating the lower classes in the 16th and 17th centuries and were strictly controlled. The North American fur trade, during the 17th and 18th centuries, provided enough pelts of hare, rabbit, lamb, and wolf to appeal to the crowd that could not afford the luxury furs, which remained to be only accessible to the elite. The royal families of Europe frequently use ermine to create robes and line their crowns. However, before the 19th century, fur was used as accents, like linings, accessories, and for trimming gowns. Full fur jackets did not appear on the fashion scene until the mid-19th century as a display of wealth by the newly prosperous middle class. Seal skin was one of the first furs to be used for a coat. Fashion went through waves of monkeys, mice, and cat fur dressing during the late 19th and early 20th centuries. The turn of the century focused on the exotic animals like lions, tigers, leopards, and polar bear fur. The Convention on International Trade in Endangered Species, stopped the exotic animal fur market and the later part of the 20th century focused once again on more accessible fur like rabbit. Today, fur is a very controversial issue with groups like PETA protesting the entire fur industry and designers, like Armani, have decided to go "fur free."

=== Objets d'art ===
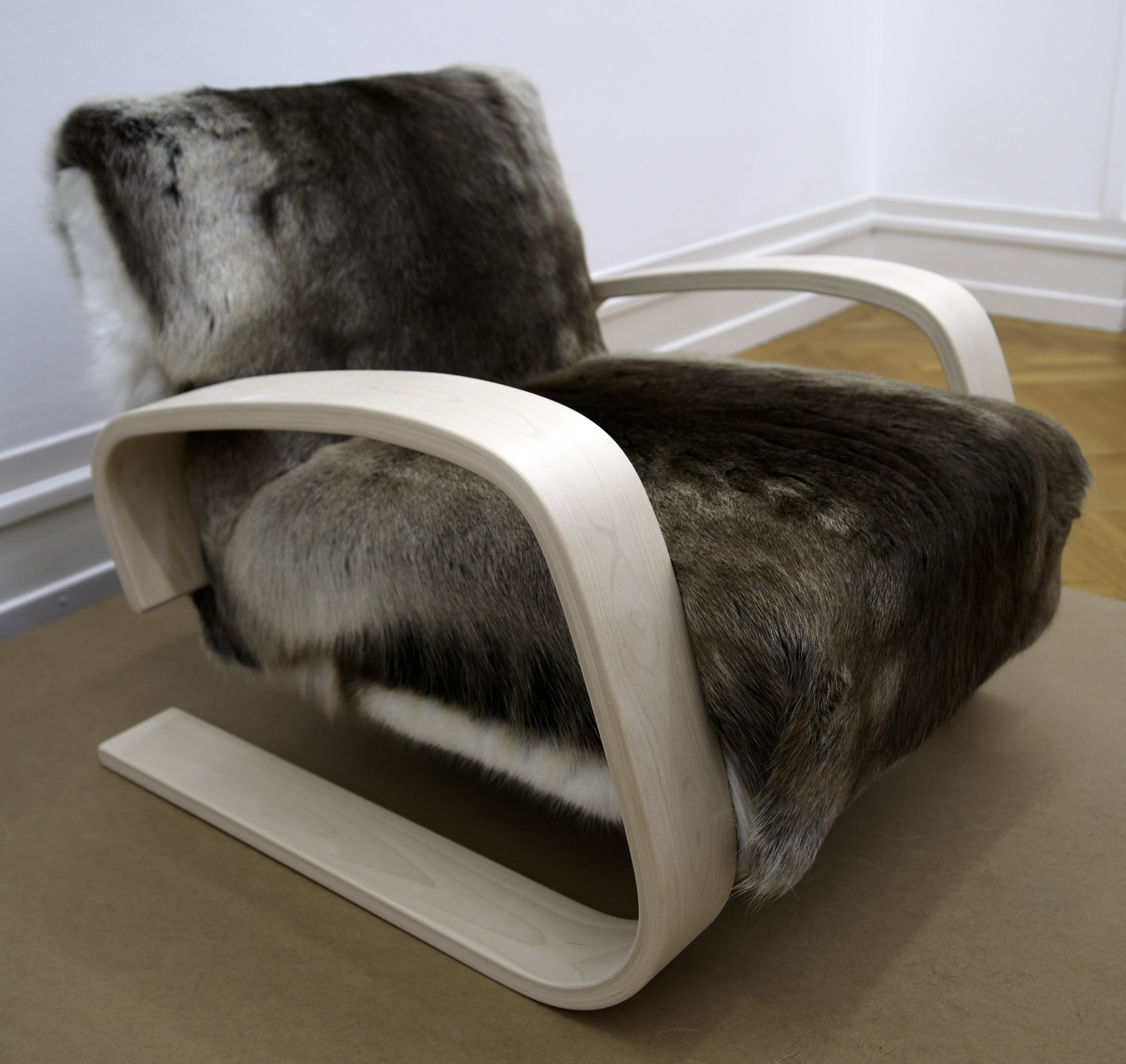
Armchair 400 with reindeer fur

==== Modern art ====
There are several notable instances of pieces of modern art in museums and collections made from, in part, of fur. The most famous is a piece of Surrealist Art made by Méret Oppenheim called Object (Le Déjeuner en fourrure) or Luncheon in Fur, which is in the permanent collection at the Museum of Modern Art in New York (see Notable Example below). Inarguably, it is the most famous piece of art containing fur that is not a piece of furniture. Oppenheim once wrote of the spirit of her piece, "fur combined with a teacup evokes such a surprising mix of messages and associations. The fur may remind viewers of wild animals and nature, while the teacup could suggest manners and civilization. With its pelt, the teacup becomes soft, rounded, and highly tactile. It seems attractive to the touch, if not, on the other hand, to the taste: Imagine drinking from it, and the physical sensation of wet fur filling the mouth." Throughout the years, she created other pieces that included fur or hide in some manner. She became so synonymous with the medium, she was known as "the artist that works with fur", a label which she refused to embrace but was nonetheless known for.

Furniture is another highly collected area of Modern Art that features fur. Artist, Alvar Aalto is famous for representing Finland in the Modern Scandinavian design. His chair, Armchair 400 made with reindeer fur is a great example of this. The MFA in Boston houses another famous chair with fur made by Richard Artschwager.

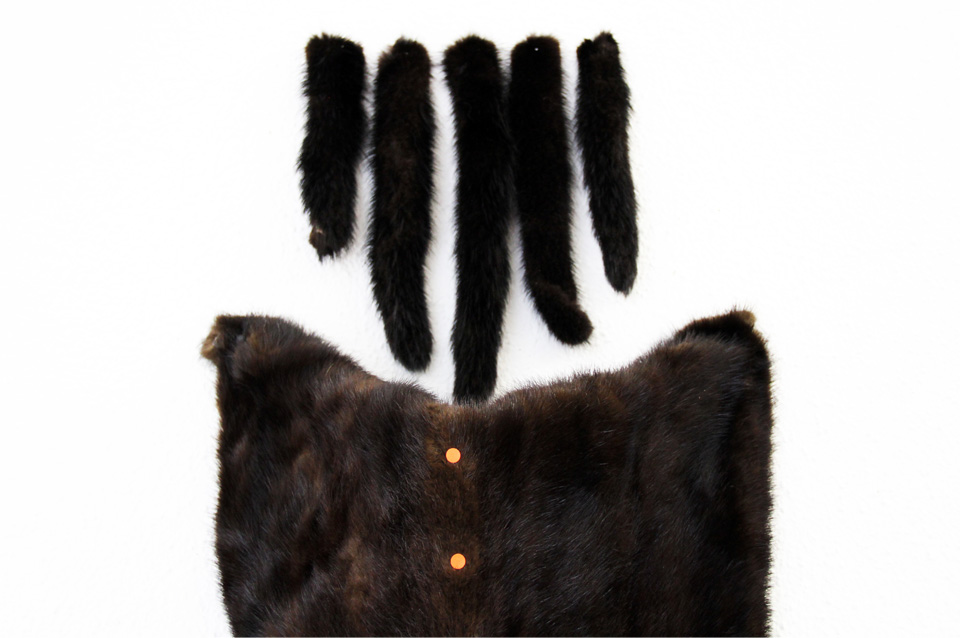
Nina Staehli's glory scape

==== Contemporary art ====
Contemporary artists are starting to embrace the use of fur as a medium as well. In 2014, an opera singer and artist named Mateo Blanco, gained notoriety for creating celebrity portraits out of dog fur, which are housed at the Orlando Odditorium. And, in 2015, Danny Rozin debuted a piece entitled "PomPom Mirror" as part of a new artist's exhibition at bitforms in New York. The piece uses faux fur and an Xbox kinect system to make the fur balls move and create a mirror effect.

Berlin based artist, Nina Staehli, uses fur in several of her pieces. glory scape is a "fur sculpture series" created by the artist that has traveled the world and features pelts of a variety of animals.

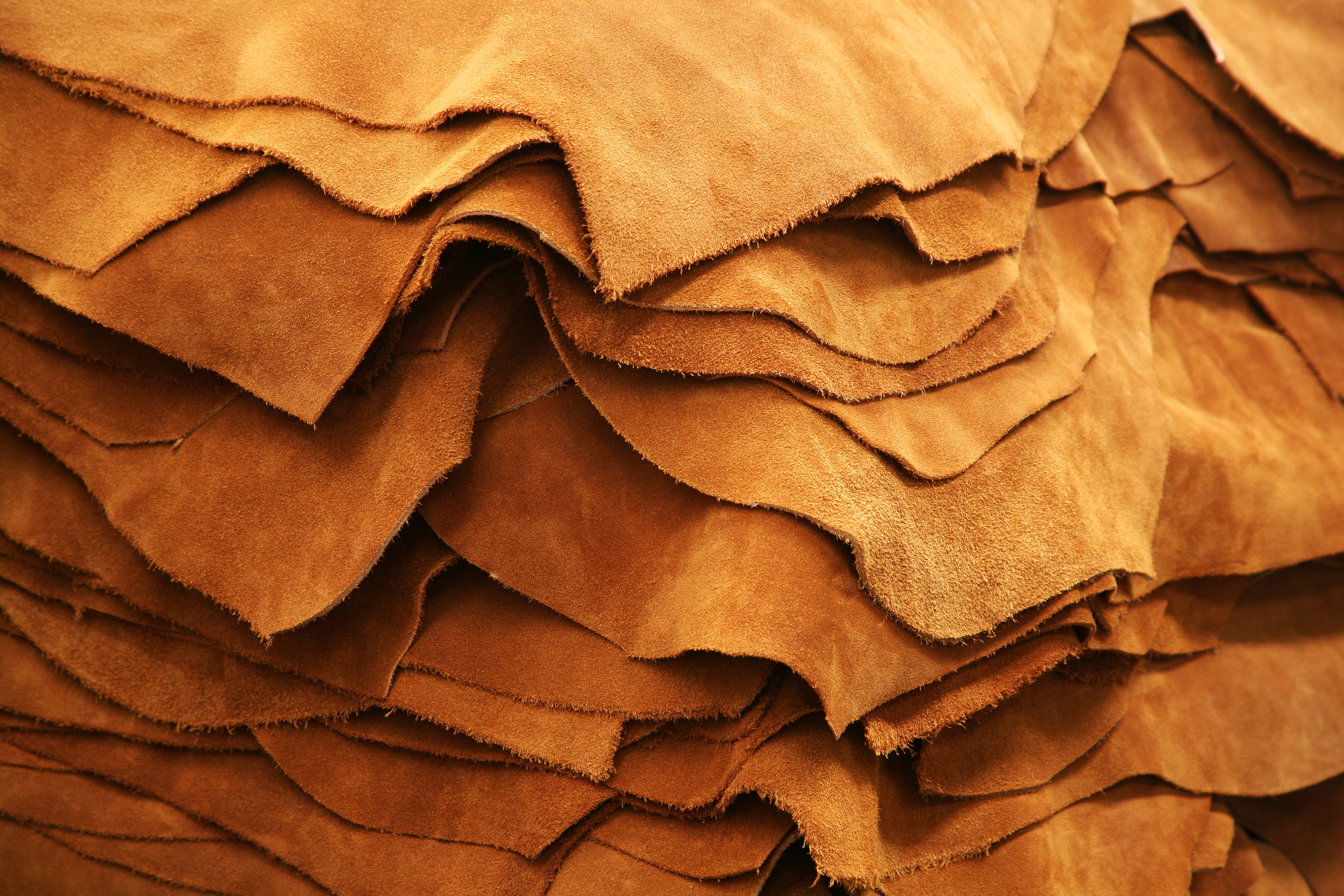
Leather

=== Leather ===
Leather is the "skin of an animal, with the hair removed, prepared for use by tanning or a similar process designed to preserve it against decay and make it pliable or supple when dry". While technically not fur, leather is a byproduct and the skin on the reverse side of pelts suffer the same kind of damage as leather products which include acid hydrolysis, oxidation, metals and salts from the tanning process, heat, and humidity. These issues also affect fur objects.

==== Dealing with leather objects ====
While closely related, the conservation and restoration of leather objects is a separate specialty.

== Causes of deterioration of fur objects ==
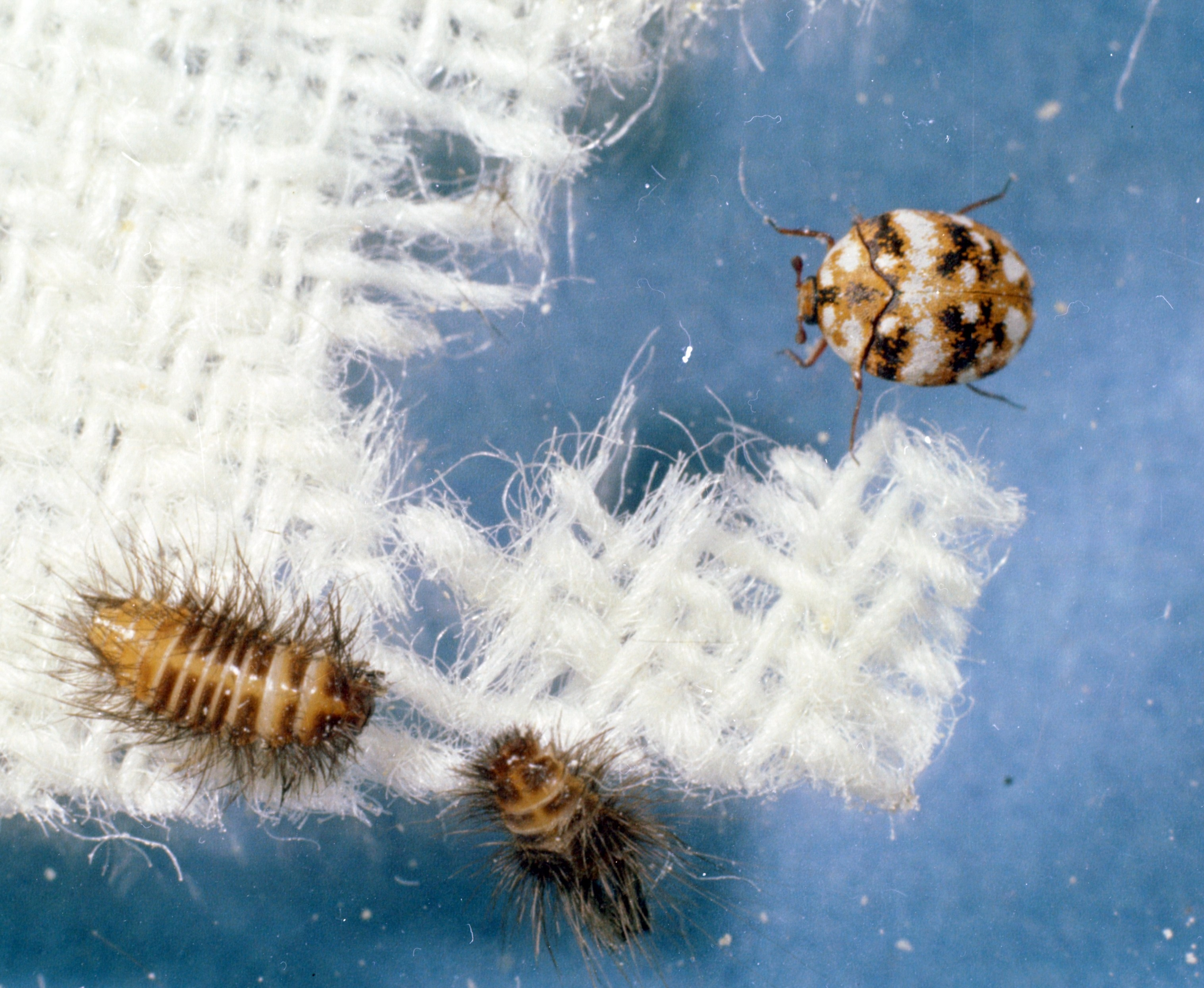
Carpet beetles eating wool

=== Insects ===
"Furs are among the most exquisite delicacies for critters..." "Fiber-feeding insects need the vitamins and amino acids found in their scavenger diet." "Clean fur lacks these supplements and must be contaminated with a certain amount of soilage like perspiration, body oils, airborne micro-organisms before insects become and issue. The only "clean" fur is one that has been sterilized through conservation efforts. The most common insects that infest fur objects are moths and carpet beetles. Most pests will lay eggs on or inside the object and the larvae will actually cause the most damage as they grow to adulthood. Infestation is evidenced by small piles of dust, the frass and casts of the insects in shedding in their growth cycle. Evidence of previous infestations on fur objects include the bodies of dead insects and their casings on the surface of the object and "concave scars" with a "scalloped" appearance from their round mandibles.

Rodents and other small mammals may also be attracted to fur objects as a food source. This kind of infestation would be visible in droppings and larger areas of damage.

=== Temperature and humidity ===
Temperature is vital for the long-term care of fur objects. Store rooms should be kept at a relative humidity level of between 45% and 55%, with fluctuations to be expected, but 65% would critical for mold growth, which skin items are highly susceptible to. This may require the use of a humidifier or dehumidifier depending on the institution. Temperature should be kept as stable as possible between 10 and 22 °C (50 and 72 °F). "Warm environments can cause the release of residual fats in skins resulting in hair loss." Excessive heat causes shrinkage in the fibers, it makes the skin brittle and more prone to tears. Whereas excess moisture leads to swelling, distortion, putrefaction (if not properly cured) and mold growth. The combination of both cause the collagen to break down and threaten the physical integrity of the piece.

=== Chemical ===
Some insecticides used as pest prevention like camphor, naphthalene, and para-dichlorobenzene (PDB) can be harmful to some colors if used with dyed fur objects. In general, hair fibers are difficult to destroy because keratin is such a strong fiber. Strong acids will not break down the fiber and strong bases "will do no more than soften or possibly bleach" the fur. However, if a fur object is subjected to that kind of treatment, the hair will become brittle and break off.

=== Improper storage ===
If fur objects have not been protected from the environment around them then they are susceptible to dirt and dust. Motes settle between the fibers and create a dirty appearance. Light exposure is also an issue. Exposure to ultraviolet light in daylight and artificial light causes pigments in specimens to fade. Light should be kept at between 50–100 lux for display and no light in storage.

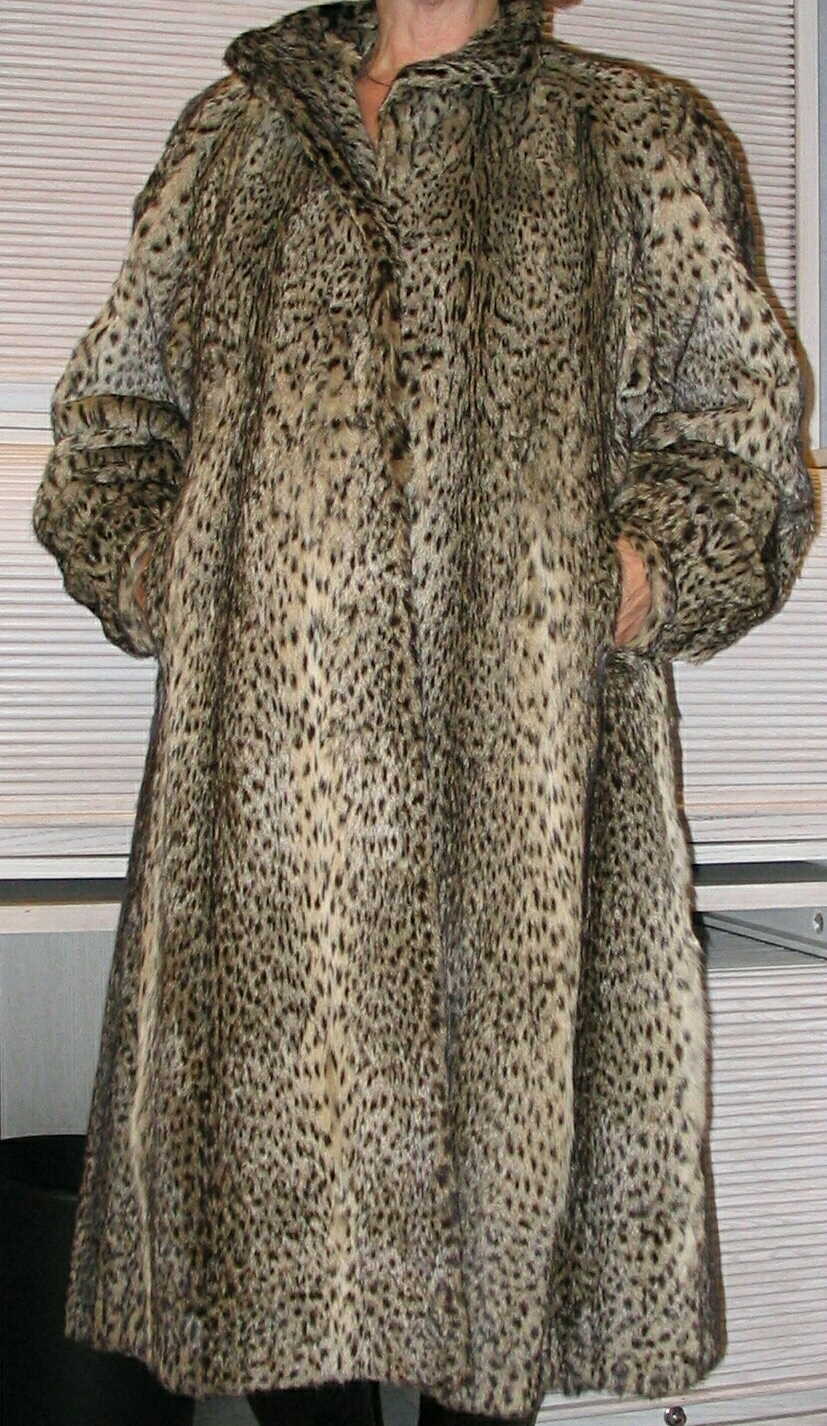
Normal wear and tear

=== Handling ===
Fur objects are made from organic materials which are soilable. For clothing and accessories, the objects are subjected to the wear and tear of everyday use may include, soiling and staining made by food, make-up, sweat, odor, or skin grease that can leave permanent marks on the fur altering both its color and texture. Make-up and oils can cause the hairs to stick together. Wearing can also result in physical damage to the object through overuse. Friction at the joints, like the armpits, elbows, and collar of a coat can cause bald areas. Stitching unraveling and rips are also common issues that arise from wearing a fur object. Nitrile gloves may be worn when handling fur objects.

=== Taxidermy issues ===
Older specimens were filled with straw and paper to recreate the musculature of the animals. Because the physicality of the animal was changed in mounting, the pelt would have become stretched or distorted to fit the new shape. A prime example of this was a rhinoceros that belonged to Louis XIV and Louis XV. "Its skin was varnished and stretched over a frame of wooden hoops." The skin is now on display at the Museum national d'Histoire naturelle in Paris, but is it unlikely it could be remounted.

== Cleaning ==
The care and cleaning of fur objects should always be undertaken by a trained collections manager or conservator.

=== Dry cleaning ===
==== Brushing and vacuuming ====
Natural hair brush

Provided there is no shedding issue, brushing is the first step in cleaning fur objects. Light brushing, using a paintbrush, will help dislodge any particulate soiling, surface dust, and insect frass. Stiffer natural brushes can be used if the dirt is stubborn but metal brushes should never be used. A variable speed vacuum with brushes and other attachments works on most surface dirt as well as removing the remnants of an insect infestation. The vacuum should be set to low and a muslin or net should be placed over the nozzle to protect the object. HEPA filters should be used if arsenic preservation is suspected.

==== Sponging ====
Greasy dirt can be removed with a vulcanized rubber sponge known as "soot sponges", because they are also great at removing smoke and soot, which are often the residue of museums or collections that were heated with coal heat in the past. Cosmetic sponges can also be in conjunction with the vacuum to remove even more surface dirt.

=== Wet cleaning ===
Wet cleaning is incredibly harmful to protein materials. Processes like dry-cleaning solvents, oil, waxes, lubricants, and saddle soaps actually can remove the natural protective oils causing further drying that can lead to embrittlement. When solvents are absolutely necessary, they should be spot tested before overall use to ensure there is no harmful dyeing or bleaching. If it was determined safe, the solvent should be applied with a swab going in the direction of the fur. If possible, absorbent paper should be placed under the strands being treated to separate them from unnecessarily getting solvent on the rest of the object. Fur objects can often become stiff or distorted, but steaming or spraying water directly on the object can cause damage. The solution for misshapen objects is increased humidity as a restorative tool.

=== Freezing ===
The only sure way of removing pest infestation on fur objects is through freezing. Objects should be placed inside a clear polyester bag, the excess air should be removed and it should be heat sealed. An alternative is a polyethylene bag with parcel tape. The bag can be placed in a domestic freezer for at least 14 days at a temperature of −18 °C (0 °F) or for 72 hours at −30 °C (−22 °F). If the atmosphere is maintained at a high humidity point in very low temperatures, the moisture will form frost on the object and with too little humidity, the object will absorb what little moisture there is and dry out, so it is vital to maintain the proper environment even in freezing. Cold storage at 10 °C (50 °F) is recommended at all times to inhibit insect activity.

== Repair and restoration ==
Conservation efforts must take into account the properties of both the fur and skin. The objects have already been through the stresses of "fur-skin processing", which can weaken the object. Physical damage that happens during the skin processing may only become evident with the passage of time. If the skin was pared too deeply during fleshing, the result would be eventual hair loss. It will also become evident, over time, if the fur was removed from the animal too early in the season. This means that the bulbs of the hair had not fully completed the growth process and the hair will fall out, leaving a sparse pelt. While, "[m]ost dry animal fiber can be extended or stretched up to 30 percent of its length before break occurs," it is unclear the object has been through before entering the collection.

=== Filling/patching and dyeing ===
Generally, fur objects are fragile and, for a variety of reasons, they can experience loss. The process of filling is a common practice. Filling is a standard procedure in which synthetic fur, most commonly made of white nylon with a "four-way spandex stretch backing". There are three standard fur lengths that include short (2.5–5.0 cm); medium (8.0–10.0 cm); and long (10.0–15.0 cm). The use of white synthetic fur allows for tinting or dying before application. It is recommended that nylon furs "can be dyed with acid or premetalized dyes according to the manufacturer's directions at pH 5.5 and pH 7 or slightly above, respectively. The dyed fabric must be subjected to an after-scour at 140°F."

The first step in the physical filling is creating a backing that is applied to bridge the area of loss and the fill material. The "most commonly used materials for backings are inert fabrics coupled with either resins, starches, or cellulose ethers with evaporative solvents, or resins or systems requiring the use of a heat-seal process." The next step is creating a template of the area of loss. That template is then transferred to the fur and cut to size. The patch should be applied to the object with "Acryloid F-10 in acetone" by applying the adhesive directly to a substrate inserted in the hole and placed the edged of the fill directly adjacent sides of the existing fur. The full should then be cut and textured to match the surrounding fur. As with all conservation efforts, it should be fully documented and reversible.

Of course, real fur can also be used to patch. Like fur is often available for common repairs like rabbit and fox.

== Preventive care, maintenance, and storage ==
"Of all the items made from natural materials, those derived from animal skins are some of the most versatile and durable found in collections." However, all fur is subject to damage from light and temperature, therefore care should be taken to mitigate their effects. Also, an integrated pest management system must be employed because organic materials are especially susceptible to pests.

=== Pelts ===
Skin garments and hides should be stored on flat mounts which supports the item when it is in storage and facilitates movement of the object without undue flexing and handling. If the object needs to be stuffed to maintain shape, unbuffered acid-free tissue should be used.

=== Arsenic-contaminated taxidermy specimens ===
The height of taxidermy in the Victorian Age brought forth the invention of "arsenical soap". French pharmacist and naturalist, Jean-Baptiste Bécoeur, invented a type of paste in 1738 to prevent pest infestation in taxidermy specimens, preserve skin and prevent the decay of remaining flesh. He came up with a mixture of ground arsenic, camphor, potassium carbonate, powdered calcium hydroxide, and soap which kept pests at bay. He was renowned for his specimens and treatment of them but, in his lifetime, he refused to disclose his exact recipe. In 1820, French taxidermist Louis Dufresne, determined the formula and popularized it, making it the standard until the 1980s. Taxidermist then opted for Borax because it is nontoxic though, ultimately less effective in pest prevention.

The use of arsenical soap does not compromise the actual specimen, but is hazardous to both museum workers and guests. Arsenic can sometimes be detected visually as the compound usually crystallizes into white "arsenic dust" that normally creates deposits at the base of hairs, feathers, around the eyes, in or at the base of ears, around mouths or bills, and on foot pads. However, the lack of arsenic dust does no preclude specimens from having previous treatment with the compound. The most efficient way to test is with the Arsenic Paper Test kit manufactured by the Macherey-Nagel Corporation. The test involves rubbing cotton swab, moistened with distilled water, and rubbing it on the contaminated specimen. The tip is then cut off and placed in a flask with water, then after an hour, it is added to concentrated chlorydric acid and around zinc powder. A test strip is then introduced and, determining the color, it can be assessed whether the object is contaminated or not. "It is safer to assume that all mammal and bird specimens collected and prepared before the 1980s may be contaminated with arsenic, and to follow proper handling guidelines."

If the object is contaminated with arsenic, proper steps must be taken to remit the toxin and keep the environment safe. Specimens that test positive must have "Arsenic Contaminated" clearly visible on their label and be separated from other specimens. Nitrile gloves and a protective apron, as well as a respirator, should be mandatory when dealing with these specimens. The specimen should be vacuumed with a HEPA filter in a well-ventilated space. These objects should be continuously tested every two or three years because arsenic was usually applied to the inside of the specimen as well, and can migrate from the inside to the outside of the specimen.

Arsenic was commonly used among ethnographic specimens as well.

=== Mounted taxidermy specimens ===
Mounted specimens should be kept on their original bases for storage purposes and encased in custom Ethafoam cases. The Ethafoam should be secured to the mount with cotton twill tape or polyethylene covered twist ties. This limits damage due to handling the fur object.

=== Clothing and accessories ===
Fur, by nature, is heavy, therefore care should be taken when storing these objects. When storing fur clothing, well-padded hangars should be employed and no furs should be packed so close to each other that they can crush or flatten one another. Cotton, silk, or Tyvek bags should be used to enclose each fur, making sure the weave of the bag is fine enough to keep out insects. Straps should never be used to support objects, even if that is their given function. The piece should either be stored flat or a support should be supplied at the base, allowing the straps or handles to be supported in a natural, unstressed, position.

== Display issues ==
For display, the piece should have adequate support for the weight and fragility of the object so it is not wrinkled or under stress. In reference to garments, mannequins should be tailored appropriately to fit the intended piece and custom mounts should be made for accessories. Acrylic mounts provide the best support for heavy materials. They also can be heated to conform to an object's exact surface shape. Padding should be applied so the object is not stressed by the hard Plexiglas. Large pelts should be displayed on tiled boards covered in a "coarse textile to help grip the item". Metal hangars, pins, or clips should never be used to display fur objects because the metal can react with the oils in the skin and stain the object, known as verdigris. Exhibitors must be aware of the agents of deterioration. Heat, light, and humidity should be carefully monitored in whatever environment is created for the display of the objects. Fur objects should not be exposed to more light than 5 footcandles - 18 °C. The exhibitor should also plan on rotating pieces during a long exhibition due to fading and physical damage that may occur. The exhibit space must also be routinely inspected for rodents and other pests.

== Notable examples ==
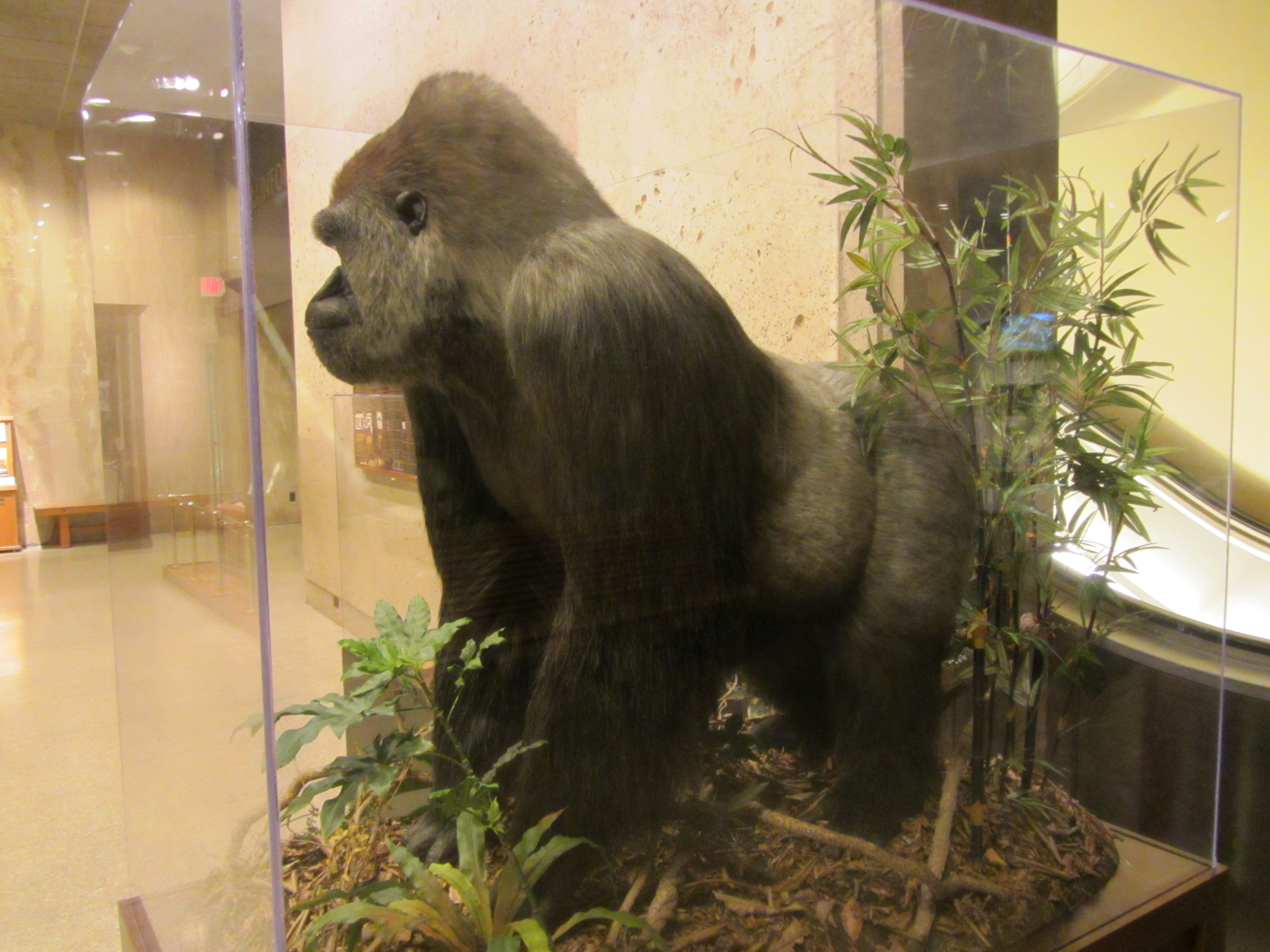
Samson at the Milwaukee Public Museum

=== Samson at the Milwaukee Public Museum ===
Samson was a Silverback Gorilla that lived at the Milwaukee County Zoo from 1950 to 1981. He was a crowd favorite for his size and frequent acts of banging on the glass of his enclosure. After his death of a heart attack, Samson's remains were given to the Milwaukee Public Museum like his brother, Sambo's, had been in 1959 for taxidermy purposes. Samson's bones were re-articulated sometime after and displayed in the museum's exhibit paying tribute to Victorian era museology, "The Sense of Wonder", next to an upright human skeleton and a smaller ape.

In 2006, to commemorate the 25th anniversary of his death, the Milwaukee Public Museum planned to mount an exhibit in his honor with a taxidermy specimen of Samson taking center stage. However, "[w]hen curators went to mount his hide, they found his freeze-dried hide had deteriorated too much to use in a taxidermy mount." His pelt was determined to be unsalvageable, so it fell to staff taxidermist, Wendy Christiansen-Senk, to recreate Samson from scratch.

Because Samson was a frequently documented local hero, Christiansen-Senk had a lot of material to work with. The most invaluable research she had was the insight of former zookeeper and Samson caregiver, Sam LaMalfa. During her recreation, she consulted Samson's bones, videos of him at the zoo, photographs, his death mask (which is also part of the MPM collection), and LaMalfa. "In conventional taxidermy we would use the real skin, tailoring the mannequin to fit the real skin. In this case I had to come up with hair and textures and colors, and try to match the hair on the body of one animal. It's a lot more challenging method." said Christiansen-Senk in 2006 regarding the effort. Christiansen-Senk molded a silicone face using Samson's death mask and thousands of photographs. She then purchased a replica gorilla skeleton and yak and synthetic hair. She spent more than a year implanting individual hairs into Samson's silicone face. Christiansen-Senk matched the coloring and patterning on Samson so convincingly that LaMalfa said, upon seeing the completed model, "That's him. I'm waiting for him to move so I can talk to him.

The result was so amazing, Christiansen-Senk entered her recreation in the 2009 World Taxidermy Championship, where she won first prize for the best recreation and the Judge's Choice Best in Show against real animal taxidermy entries. Samson remains on permanent exhibit at the Milwaukee Public Museum.

=== Object (Le Déjeuner en fourrure) at the Museum of Modern Art ===
In 1936, Alfred H. Barr Jr., the young director of New York's Museum of Modern Art, approached Méret Oppenheim to negotiate purchasing Luncheon in Fur. Oppenheim expressed a willingness to sell and Barr paid $50 to make history. Luncheon in Fur was the first work by a woman the museum acquired and Oppenheim is dubbed the First Lady of MoMA. As the First Lady, Oppenheim reportedly gave instructions for the conservation of her piece. Those instructions have not been made public, but the piece has been on display in a "Plexiglas vitrine" since 1947 and has been described as "balding".

It is assumed that Oppenheim glued the cream-and-tan pelt of a Chinese gazelle to her now famous china. The adhesive dates from the creation of the object in 1936, so it may be breaking down. Also, the lighting and the fact it is on exhibit so frequently cause conservation concerns. Ideally, the object would be conserved in accordance with today's standards, but the directive Oppenheim left may speak more towards her intent as an artist and any attempt to conserve the piece could alter its "original state".
