= 1801 in birding and ornithology =

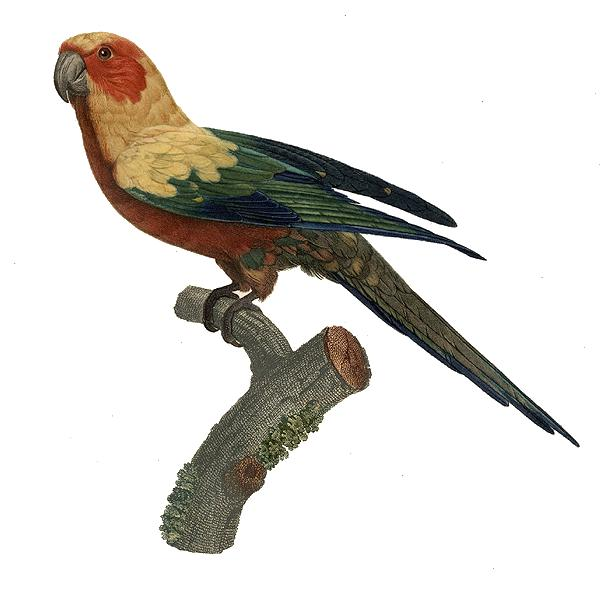
"Perruche Ara Guarouba femelle" painted by Jacques Barraband. From Histoire Naturelle des Perroquets by François Levaillant

- John Latham publishes Supplement II for his series, A General Synopsis of Birds (1781–1801) in which he describes several species of birds for the first time, including the bell miner, the pallid cuckoo, and the African swamphen.
- Jacques Barraband is commissioned to produce a series of watercolours of birds by Napoleon Bonaparte.
- Jean Baptiste Bory de Saint-Vincent begins a two-year expedition to explore Mauritius, Réunion, Madeira, Tenerife, and St. Helena.
- The green mango (as Trochilus viridis) and Puerto Rican emerald (as Trochilus maugaeus) are first described by Louis Pierre Vieillot and Jean Baptiste Audebert.
- Natural History Society of Nuremberg founded.
