= 1803 in birding and ornithology =

- James Grant publishes an account of his voyage to New South Wales, Australia. The gang-gang cockatoo (as Psittacus fimbriatus), was first described in this publication.
