= 1807 in birding and ornithology =

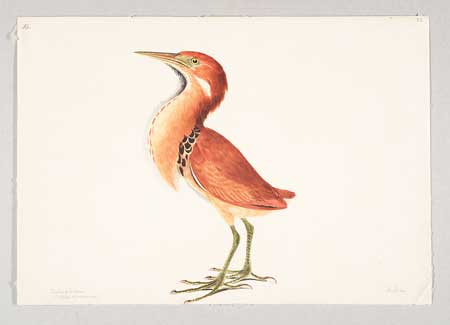
Cinnamon bittern painted in 1790 by Elizabeth Gwillim who died in 1807 the year of the bird's formal description

- Coenraad Jacob Temminck Catalogue systématique du cabinet d'ornithologie et de la collection de quadrumanes de Crd. Jb. Temminck. Avec une courte description des oiseaux non-decrits Amsterdam Chez C. Sepp Jansz.
- Birds described in 1807 include the Oriental pied hornbill, the double-banded courser, the black-collared starling and the black-headed munia.
- After three years in Java Jean-Baptiste Leschenault de La Tour returns to France with a large collection of plants and birds. His Javanese birds were described by Georges Cuvier.
- Death of Pierre Joseph Buchoz.
