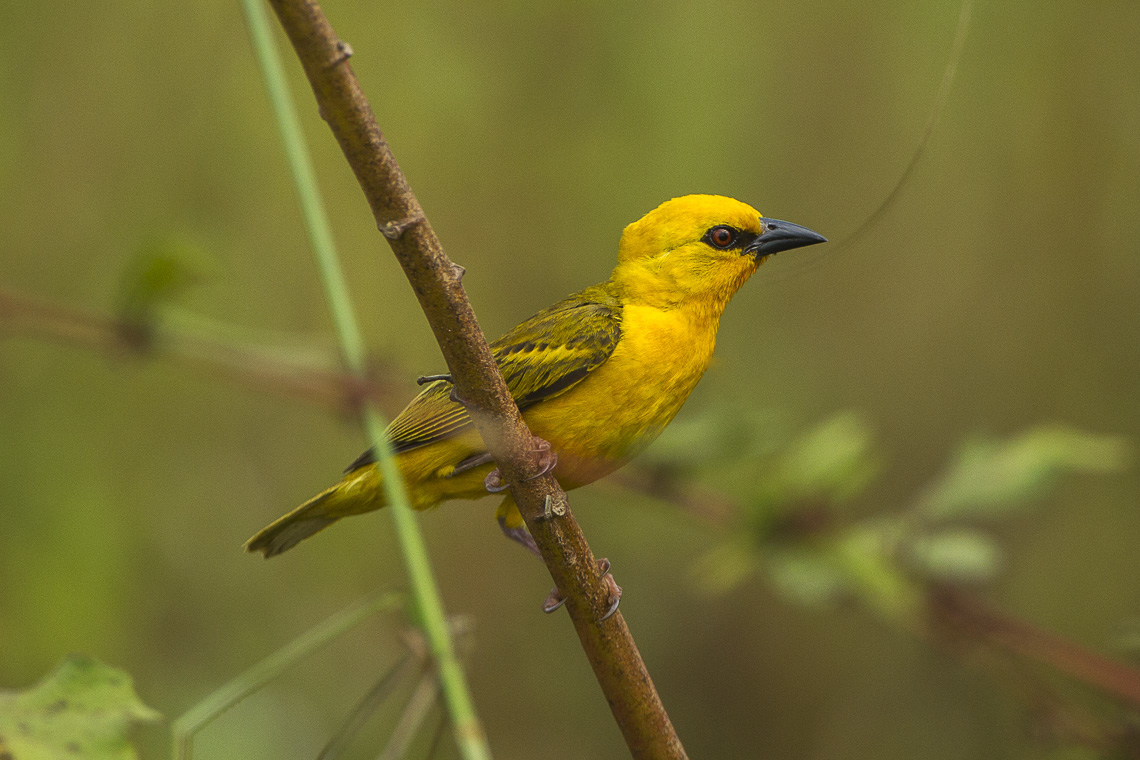
- Male
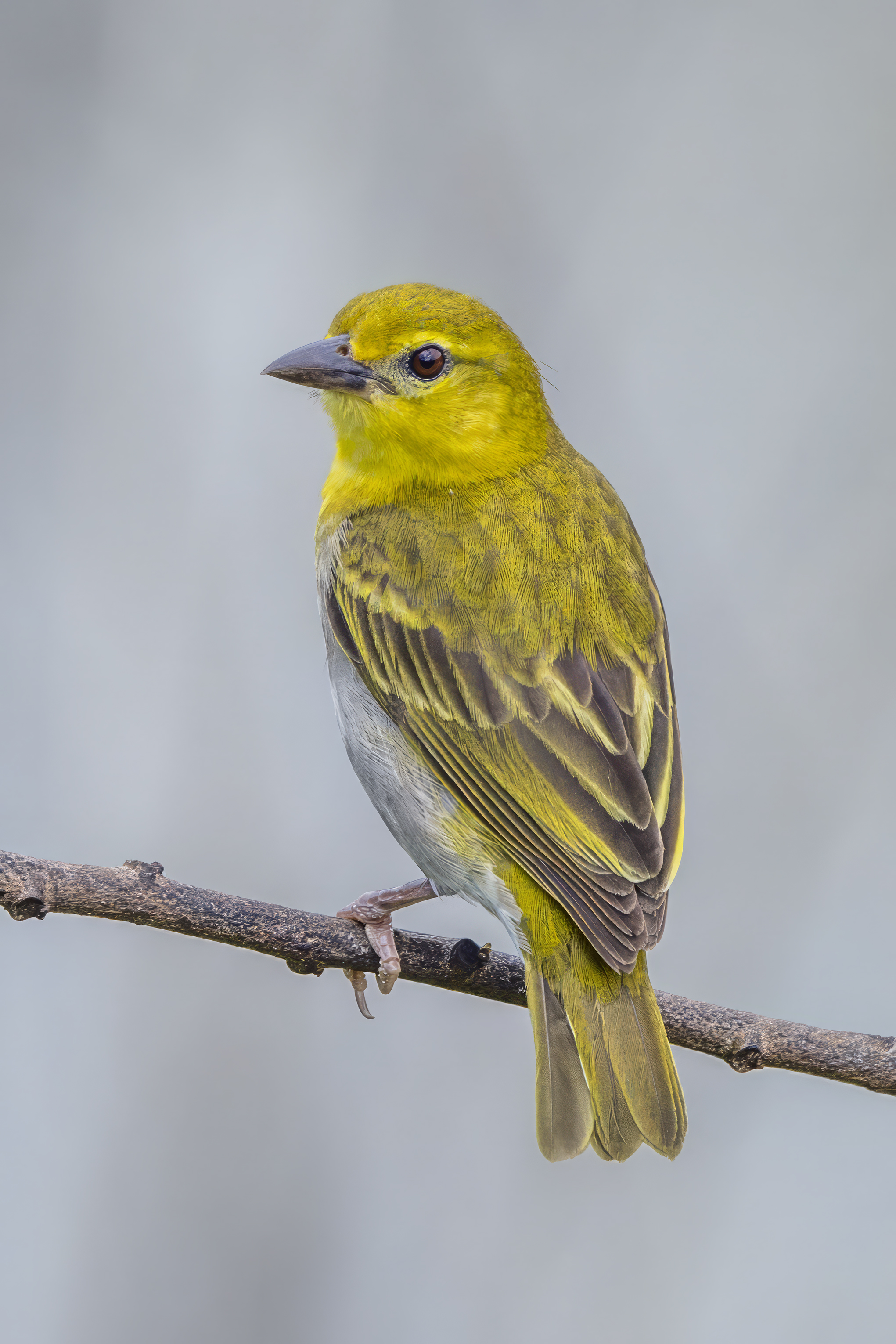
- Female both P. a. aurantius in Ghana

Conservation status
- Least Concern (IUCN 3.1)

Scientific classification
- Kingdom: Animalia
- Phylum: Chordata
- Class: Aves
- Order: Passeriformes
- Family: Ploceidae
- Genus: Ploceus
- Species: P. aurantius

Binomial name
- Ploceus aurantius (Vieillot, 1805)

Synonyms
- Malimbus aurantius Vieillot, 1805

= Orange weaver =

Species of bird

The orange weaver (Ploceus aurantius) is a species of bird in the weaver family, Ploceidae. It is sparsely distributed across African tropical rainforest.

== Taxonomy and systematics ==
=== Subspecies ===
There are two subspecies recognized:

- Ploceus aurantius aurantius - (Vieillot, 1805): Found from Sierra Leone to Democratic Republic of the Congo, and south to Angola
- Ploceus aurantius rex - Neumann, 1908: Found in Uganda, western Kenya and north-western Tanzania

== Description ==
The orange weaver can reach a length of about 12.5 centimetres (4.9 in), including the tail. These birds exhibit sexual dimorphism, and plumage also varies seasonally. During breeding or "nuptial" season, the male has a black beak, a small patch of black skin in front and behind the eyes (making the eyes look oval in shape), and brown wings. The rest of the plumage is a brilliant red to orange in color. Bill is pale and slender, while eyes are reddish-brown or pale grey.

Outside of breeding season, the males sport plumage that is considerably more drab, brown overall with some dark streaks and a cream-colored belly. The females have the same plumage year-round, which resembles that of the off-season males. The males of this species are often confused with males of the species Euplectes orix, commonly known as the southern red bishop. This bird has a black belly, however.

== Distribution and habitat ==
This species can be found in western and central Africa. The orange weaver lives in mangroves, thickets and swamps in coastal lagoons and along major West African rivers.

== Behavior and ecology ==
In the wild, orange weavers are polygamous and make their homes in reed beds close to the surface of water. These birds are colonial, with hundreds of complexly woven nests at some sites, which include palms, reeds and other trees.

They mainly feed on fruit and seeds, but also on insects (locusts, beetles, caterpillars). They are usually found in pairs or in small groups. Males build an ovoid nest with grass and palm strips. Females lay two eggs and incubate them.

== Aviculture ==
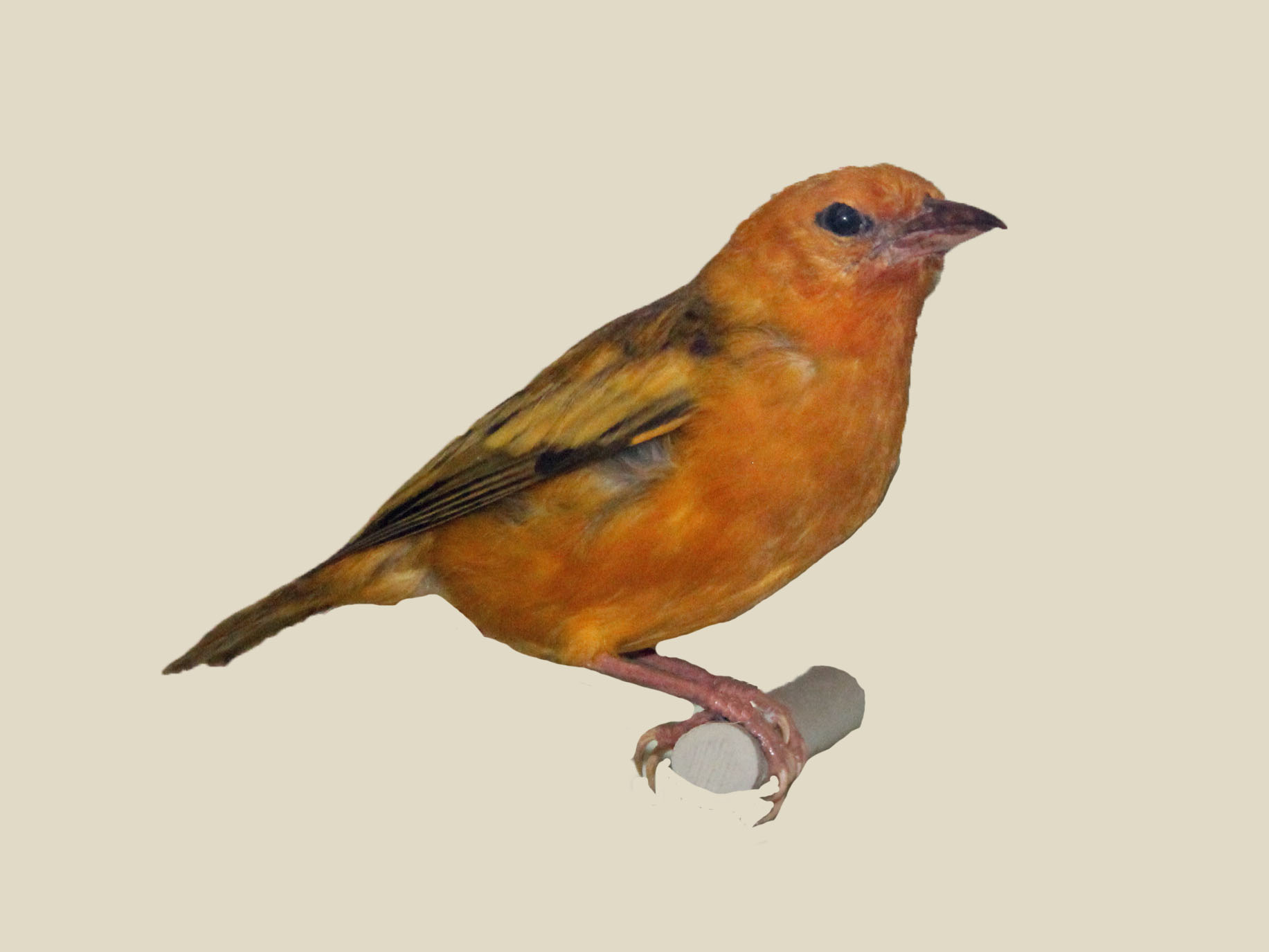
Specimen of P. aurantius subsp. rex in Nairobi National Museum

The orange weaver is commonly kept in aviculture. They are quite hardy for small birds. Like all finches, they should be kept in groups. Because of their active nature, these finches should be housed in large aviaries. They may be housed with other, larger finches, and will generally do well in this situation. However, individual orange weavers can become quite aggressive during breeding season. Because of this, the aggressive finches must sometimes be separated from the group. Orange weavers should be fed a diet that is a balanced mixture of small cereal seeds, fresh greens and some live foods, such as meal worms.
