= 1806 in birding and ornithology =

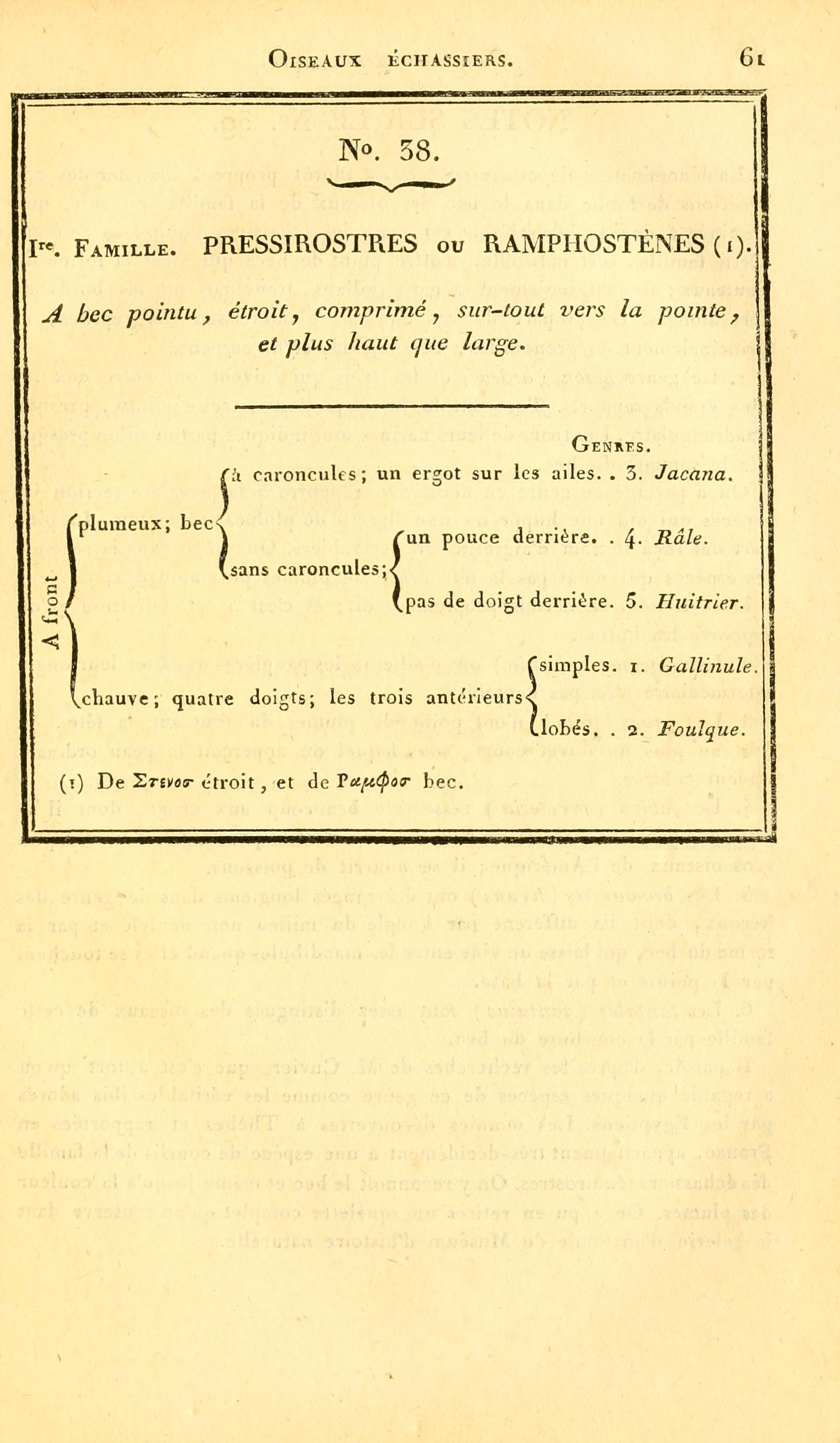
Plate from Zoologie Analytique showing how the jacana, râle (water rail), houtrier (oystercatcher), gallinule (moorhen) and Foulque (coot) may be separated by characters of the feet

- André Marie Constant Duméril Zoologie analytique ou, Méthode naturelle de classification des animaux rendue plus facile a l'aide de tableaux synoptique Paris, Allais. Also published in German as Analytische Zoologie Weimar, Im Verlage des Landes-Industrie-Compto. In this work which covers the Animalia as a whole dichotomous keys are used to separate taxa in a scientific approach.
- Anders Erikson Sparrman published an ornithology of Sweden titled Svensk Ornithologie. One of the many regional faunas of Europe to appear in the nineteenth century.
- Johann Heinrich Friedrich Link catalogued the natural history collection of the University of Rostock in Beschreibung der Naturalien-Sammlung der Universitat zu Rostock. In this work he proposed a new genus Alles to contain the little auk replacing the genus Alca of Carl Linnaeus and separating it from the other auks. For other changes of the 546 bird names used in the 10th edition of Systema Naturae see Aves in the 10th edition of Systema Naturae by Carl Linnaeus.
