= Louis Dufresne =

French ornithologist and taxidermist

Louis Dufresne (18 January 1752, Champien, near Peronne – 11 October 1832) was a French ornithologist and taxidermist.

Louis Dufresne was one of the naturalists on board the Astrolabe, which accompanied by the Boussole, left Brest in August 1785 on a voyage of discovery. The ships went first to Madeira and Tenerife, then to Trinidad and then to the coast of Brazil (including Santa Catarina Island). Rounding Cape Horn the expedition landed at Concepción and on to the Sandwich Islands and then sailed north along the coast of north-west America to Alaska. In 1786, the expedition resumed this time visiting Monterey before crossing the Pacific to land in Macao in China. This expedition, led by Laperouse visited Botany Bay, Australia, in January 1788, only days after the First Fleet arrived, sailed north and was shipwrecked: Dufresne and Lesseps were the only ones to survive, Dufresne having left the expedition in Macau.

Six years later in 1793, Dufresne became a taxidermist and curator at Museum d'Histoire Naturelle. His work included the classification and arrangement of collections of invertebrates as well as vertebrates and he visited many parts of the world on behalf of the Museum. In 1802 he popularized the use of arsenical soap for preserving birds in an article in Nouveau dictionnaire d'histoire naturelle a technique which had enabled the Muséum to build the greatest collection of birds in the world.

Dufresne also maintained a private collection which by 1818 consisted of 1,600 bird specimens (on wooden supports and with both with Latin and French names), 800 world eggs, 4,000 shells, fossils, amphibians, corals and 12,000 insects. This collection was purchased by the University of Edinburgh in 1819. In 1854 the University transferred the Natural History Museum into the government ownership to form a publicly-funded national museum, which became the Royal Scottish Museum (now part of National Museums Scotland).

In 1829 Dufresne was awarded the Legion of Honour. He died of lung disease.
