= Heinrich of Lübeck =

German Dominican philosopher (fl. 1325)

Heinrich of Lübeck (fl. 1325) was a German Dominican Thomist philosopher.
