= Graz school =

Austrian psychological school

The Graz school (German: Grazer Schule), also Meinong's School, of experimental psychology and object theory was headed by Alexius Meinong, who was professor and Chair of Philosophy at the University of Graz where he founded the Graz Psychological Institute (Grazer Psychologische Institut) in 1894. The Graz school's phenomenological psychology and philosophical semantics achieved important advances in philosophy and psychological science.

== History ==
Alexius Meinong studied under Franz Brentano at the University of Vienna. He completed his habilitation in 1878 and taught as a Privatdozent. His students in Vienna included Christian von Ehrenfels, Alois Höfler and Anton Oelzelt-Newin, with whom he formed lifelong friendships. In 1882 Meinong was appointed to the University of Graz, becoming full professor in 1889 and remaining there until his death in 1920. Ehrenfels followed him to Graz in 1884–85 and wrote his doctoral dissertation under Meinong's supervision before returning to Vienna.

Meinong founded the first psychological laboratory in Austria in 1984. Then, in 1897, he established the Philosophical Seminar at Graz. The laboratory became the center of the school's work. Stephan Witasek directed its research in its early years. Vittorio Benussi, who completed a dissertation on the Zöllner illusion in 1901, later became its leading experimenter. Edwin Boring, a history of psychology, wrote that Benussi was the most productive experimental psychologist Austria had produced. Other students of Meinong at Graz included Rudolf Ameseder, Ernst Mally, Eduard Martinak, Joseph Marx, Franz Weber, Ferdinand Weinhandl and Fritz Heider, as well as Konrad Zindler, Wilhelm Maria Frankl and Steno Tedeschi.

In 1904 Meinong edited Untersuchungen zur Gegenstandstheorie und Psychologie (Investigations in Object Theory and Psychology). This volume included work and essays from a number of members of the school and combined its experimental psychology with Meinong's object theory.

The school also worked in the area of Gestalt psychology. Ehrenfels's 1890 essay "Über Gestaltqualitäten" (On Gestalt Qualities) drew on Meinong's work on relations. It introduced the concept of Gestalt qualities. Meinong later described it as the most important precursor of his own theory. Meinong's distinction between founding objects (inferiora) and founded, higher-order objects (superiora) provided the theoretical basis for the Graz school's experimental research on Gestalt perception.

After Meinong's death, Ernst Mally succeeded him at Graz. Mally supervised, among others, J. N. Findlay, whose 1933 dissertation became the book Meinong's Theory of Objects. The Graz school is regarded as part of the wider movement of Austrian realism.

== Theories ==
The Graz school developed much of Meinongs theories that covered various topics such as philosophical psychology, metaphysics, semantics and philosophy of language, theory of evidence, possibility and probability, and value theory as well as the analysis of emotion, imagination and abstraction. The School is known for its object theory and theory of the mind. An important foundation of the Graz school is Meinong's position that psychology is part of philosophy where the former (particularly descriptive psychology) is considered the fundamental discipline while the latter represents "a whole group of sciences". It also embraced the Brentano's ideas such as the empiricist methodology for scientific philosophy, the intentionality thesis, and the goal of developing an intentionalist philosophy of fact and value.

=== Object theory ===
The object theory of the Graz school first emerged in Meinong's work, On Assumptions, published in 1902.

=== Aesthetics ===
It is recognized that Witasek and Benussi assisted Meinong in his philosophical investigations and had contributed to the development of the Graz school. The development of the concept of aesthetic value in the Graz school is attributed to Witasek. Meinong's himself did not focus on this area in his investigations despite his interest in the arts. The subject was discussed in a 400-page book called Grundzuge der allgemeinen Asthetik, which addressed – according to the Meinongian framework – the problems that an aesthetic theory is expected to deal with during its time. This included the evaluation of the Meinongian theory of aesthetic enjoyment and its link to the psychology of the sense experience of aesthetic objects.

== See also ==
- The Berlin School of experimental psychology founded by Carl Stumpf
- The School of Brentano
