= Physical object =

Identifiable collection of matter

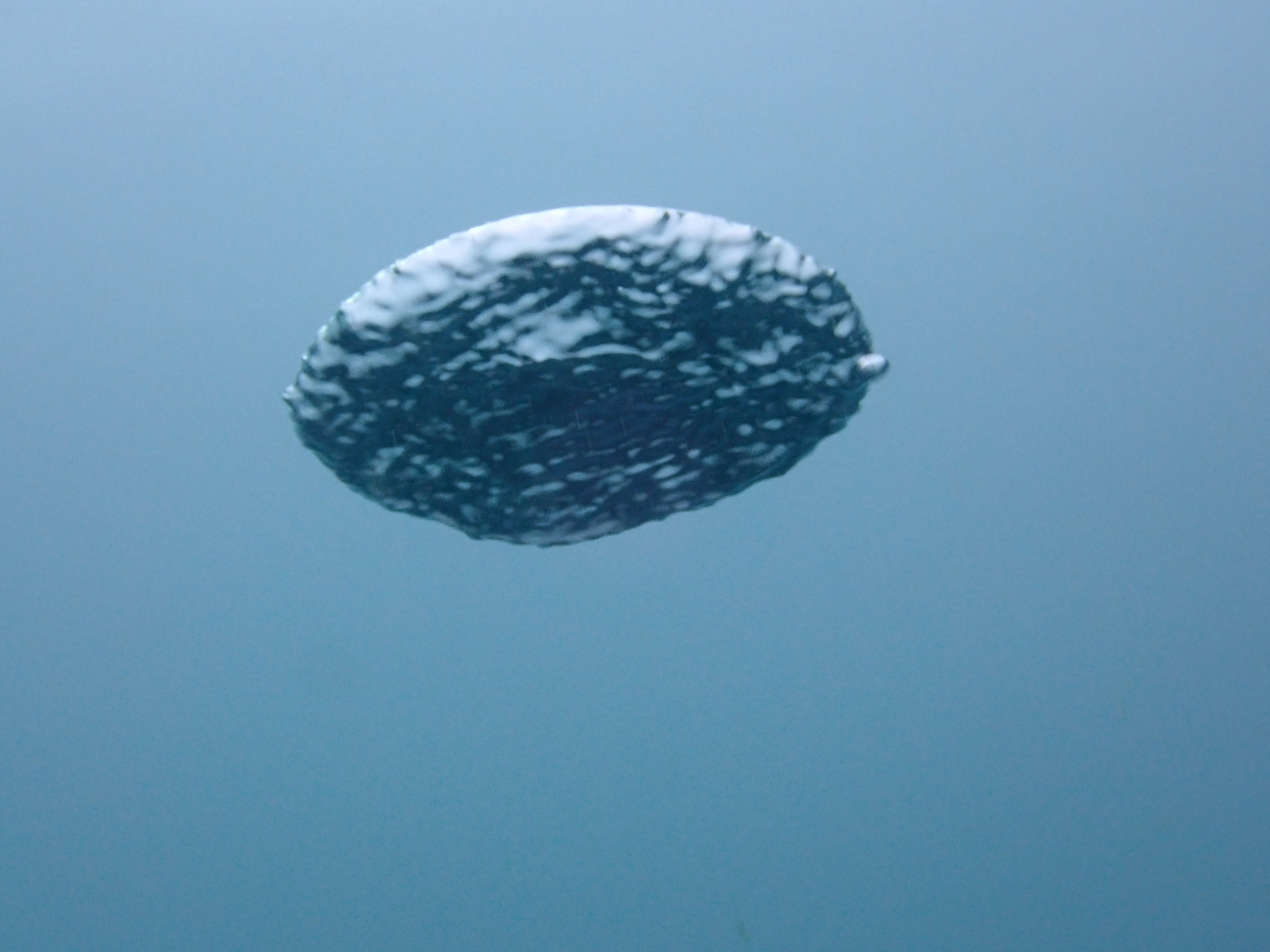
A bubble of exhaled gas in water

In natural language and physical science, a physical object or material object (or simply an object or body) is a collection of matter, usually contiguous, with a defined boundary, that exists in space and time. It is usually contrasted with abstract objects and mental objects.

Also in common usage, an object is not constrained to consist of the same collection of matter. Atoms or parts of an object may change over time. An object is usually meant to be defined by the simplest representation of the boundary consistent with the observations. However the laws of physics only apply directly to objects that consist of the same collection of matter.

In physics, an object is an identifiable collection of matter, which may be constrained by an identifiable boundary, and may move as a unit by translation or rotation, in 3-dimensional space.

Each object has a unique identity, independent of any other properties. Two objects may be identical, in all properties except position, but still remain distinguishable. In most cases the boundaries of two objects may not overlap at any point in time. The property of identity allows objects to be counted.

Examples of models of physical bodies include, but are not limited to a particle, several interacting smaller bodies (particulate or otherwise). Discrete objects are in contrast to continuous media.

The common conception of physical objects includes that they have extension in the physical world, although there do exist theories of quantum physics and cosmology which arguably challenge this. In modern physics, "extension" is understood in terms of the spacetime: roughly speaking, it means that for a given moment of time the body has some location in the space (although not necessarily amounting to the abstraction of a point in space and time). A physical body as a whole is assumed to have such quantitative properties as mass, momentum, electric charge, other conserved quantities, and possibly other quantities.

An object with known composition and described in an adequate physical theory is an example of physical system.

== In common usage ==
An object is known by the application of senses. The properties of an object are inferred by learning and reasoning based on the information perceived. Abstractly, an object is a construction of our mind consistent with the information provided by our senses, using Occam's razor.

In common usage an object is the material inside the boundary of an object, in three-dimensional space. The boundary of an object is a contiguous surface which may be used to determine what is inside, and what is outside an object. An object is a single piece of material, whose extent is determined by a description based on the properties of the material. An imaginary sphere of granite within a larger block of granite would not be considered an identifiable object, in common usage. A fossilized skull encased in a rock may be considered an object because it is possible to determine the extent of the skull based on the properties of the material.

For a rigid body, the boundary of an object may change over time by continuous translation and rotation. For a deformable body the boundary may also be continuously deformed over time in other ways.

An object has an identity. In general two objects with identical properties, other than position at an instance in time, may be distinguished as two objects and may not occupy the same space at the same time (excluding component objects). An object's identity may be tracked using the continuity of the change in its boundary over time. The identity of objects allows objects to be arranged in sets and counted.

The material in an object may change over time. For example, a rock may wear away or have pieces broken off it. The object will be regarded as the same object after the addition or removal of material, if the system may be more simply described with the continued existence of the object, than in any other way. The addition or removal of material may discontinuously change the boundary of the object. The continuation of the object's identity is then based on the description of the system by continued identity being simpler than without continued identity.

For example, a particular car might have all its wheels changed and still be regarded as the same car.

The identity of an object may not split. If an object is broken into two pieces at most one of the pieces has the same identity. An object's identity may also be destroyed if the simplest description of the system at a point in time changes from identifying the object to not identifying it. Also an object's identity is created at the first point in time that the simplest model of the system consistent with perception identifies it.

An object may be composed of components. A component is an object completely within the boundary of a containing object.

A living thing may be an object, and is distinguished from non-living things by the designation of the latter as inanimate objects. Inanimate objects generally lack the capacity or desire to undertake actions, although humans in some cultures may tend to attribute such characteristics to non-living things.

== In physics ==
=== Classical mechanics ===
In classical mechanics a physical body is a collection of matter having properties including mass, velocity, momentum and energy. The matter exists in a volume of three-dimensional space. This space is its extension.

Interactions between objects are partly described by orientation and external shape.

In continuum mechanics an object may be described as a collection of sub-objects, down to an infinitesimal division, which interact with each other by forces that may be described internally by pressure and mechanical stress.

=== Quantum mechanics ===
In quantum mechanics an object is a particle or collection of particles. Until measured, a particle does not have a physical position. A particle is defined by a probability distribution of finding the particle at a particular position. There is a limit to the accuracy with which the position and velocity may be measured. A particle or collection of particles is described by a quantum state.

These ideas vary from the common usage understanding of what an object is.

=== String theory ===
In particle physics, there is a debate as to whether some elementary particles are not bodies, but are points without extension in physical space within spacetime, or are always extended in at least one dimension of space as in string theory or M theory.

== In psychology ==
In some branches of psychology, depending on school of thought, a physical object has physical properties, as compared to mental objects. In (reductionistic) behaviorism, objects and their properties are the (only) meaningful objects of study. While in modern-day behavioral psychotherapy, it is still only the means for goal-oriented behavior modifications, in Body Psychotherapy it is not a means only anymore, but its felt sense is a goal of its own. In cognitive psychology, physical bodies as they occur in biology are studied in order to understand the mind, which may not be a physical body, as in functionalist schools of thought.

== In philosophy ==
A physical body is an enduring object that exists throughout a particular trajectory of space and orientation over a particular duration of time, and which is located in the world of physical space (i.e., as studied by physics). This contrasts with abstract objects such as mathematical objects which do not exist at any particular time or place.

Examples are a cloud, a human body, a banana, a billiard ball, a table, or a proton. This is contrasted with abstract objects such as mental objects, which exist in the mental world, and mathematical objects. Other examples that are not physical bodies are emotions, the concept of "justice", a feeling of hatred, or the number "3". In some philosophies, like the idealism of George Berkeley, a physical body is a mental object, but still has extension in the space of a visual field.

== See also ==
- Abstract object theory
- Astronomical object
- Deformable body
- Free body
- Human body
- Non-physical entity
- Physical model
- Rigid body
- Ship of Theseus, a thought experiment about an object's identity over time
