= School of Brentano =

Group of philosophers and psychologists

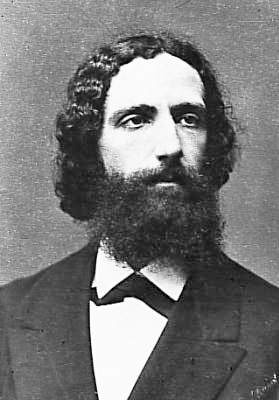

The School of Brentano was a group of philosophers and psychologists who studied with and were influenced by Franz Brentano. While it was never a school in the traditional sense, Brentano tried to maintain some cohesion in the school. However, two of his most famous students, Alexius Meinong and Edmund Husserl, ultimately moved radically beyond his theories.

== Notable members ==
Among the School of Brentano are counted several founders of new schools and movements (place and period they studied with Brentano):

- Carl Stumpf (Würzburg, 1866–1870), taught Aron Gurwitsch and became the head of the Berlin school (Max Wertheimer, Kurt Koffka, Wolfgang Köhler)
- Edmund Husserl (Vienna, 1884–1886), founded the phenomenological movement, influencing:
  - Munich phenomenology (Johannes Daubert, Adolf Reinach)
  - Existential phenomenology (Jean-Paul Sartre, Maurice Merleau-Ponty and Martin Heidegger)
- Alexius Meinong (Vienna, 1875–1878), was the head of the Graz school, and he influenced among others Stephan Witasek, Alois Höfler, Vittorio Benussi
- Christian von Ehrenfels, credited with the introduction of the notion of Gestalt, which led to the establishment of Gestalt psychology
- Kazimierz Twardowski (Vienna, 1885–1889), became father of the Lwów–Warsaw school of logic (Jan Łukasiewicz, Stanisław Leśniewski, Tadeusz Kotarbiński, Władysław Witwicki, Kazimierz Ajdukiewicz and Alfred Tarski)
- Anton Marty (Würzburg, 1866–1870), developed a detailed theory of language with his disciple Karl Bühler, which influenced Reinach (who developed a theory of speech acts long before John Austin), whose lectures were attended by Franz Kafka
- Sigmund Freud, founded psychoanalysis

Other students included Alois Höfler, Benno Kerry, Tomáš Masaryk, and Rudolf Steiner, while Oskar Kraus was an indirect student through Anton Marty.

Scholars such as Roderick Chisholm, George Edward Moore, Gilbert Ryle, John Searle, Barry Smith, Kevin Mulligan, Peter Simons and Jan Woleński have propagated Brentano's influence to analytic philosophy through their research, editions and publications.

Through the works and teachings of his pupils the philosophy of Franz Brentano has been spread far and wide and indirectly influenced many if not most of the debates in contemporary philosophy, cognitive science and philosophy of mind.

== See also ==
- Austrian realism

== Bibliography ==
- The School of Franz Brentano (ed. L. Albertazzi, M. Libardi & R. Poli), Kluwer, Dordrecht 1996. ISBN 0-7923-3766-2
- The Cambridge Companion to Brentano (ed. D. Jacquette), Cambridge University Press 2004. ISBN 0-521-00765-8
- Rollinger, Robin D., Husserl's Position in the School of Brentano Kluwer, Dordrecht 1999. ISBN 0-7923-5684-5
- Rollinger, Robin D., Austrian Phenomenology: Brentano, Meinong, Husserl, and Others on Mind and Object, Ontos-Verlag, Frankfurt am Main 2008. ISBN 978-3-86838-005-7.
- Barry Smith, Austrian Philosophy: The Legacy of Franz Brentano, Open Court Publishing Company Chicago and LaSalle, Illinois 1996.
- Barry Smith - Brentano and Kafka In: Axiomathes, 8 (1997), 83–104
- Ion Tanasescu & Victor Popescu (coord.), Gabriel Cercel & Cristian Ciocan (eds.), The School of Brentano and Husserlian Phenomenology, Studia Phaenomenologica vol. III, nr. 1-2 (2003), ISSN 1582-5647, ISBN 973-50-0564-6.
