= Steno Tedeschi =

- Born: 1881; Trieste, Austria-Hungary
- Died: 1911 (aged 29–30); Trieste, Austria-Hungary
- Relatives: Italo Svevo (cousin)

Education
- Education: University of Graz
- Academic advisors: Alexius Meinong; Stephan Witasek

Philosophical work
- Era: 20th-century philosophy
- Region: Western philosophy
- School: Graz school
- Institutions: Municipal Gymnasium of Trieste
- Main interests: Aesthetics; Value theory
- Notable ideas: Latent value

Steno Tedeschi (1881–1911) was an Italian intellectual and academic. His works were associated with the ideas of the Graz school and he is noted for contributing to its object theory and Stephan Witasek's aesthetics. Tedeschi was Italo Svevo's cousin.

== Biography ==
Tedeschi was born in 1881 in Trieste, Austro-Hungarian Empire. He was a cousin of Italo Svevo. Tedeschi studied in Graz from 1904 to 1906. There, he became a student of the Austrian philosopher, Alexius Meinong. Tedeschi would study and illustrate the latter's theory of objects. Under the tutelage of Stephan Witasek, Tadeschi was introduced to the notion of habit through the latter's idea of value beauty or Wertschönheit. He would expand Witasek's position that habits possess the capacity of creating needs and values. When he returned to Trieste, he attempted to promote and defend the ideas of the Graz school. After completing his education, he first taught the Municipal Gymnasium of Trieste. He became a professor of philosophy and is said to have taught and inspired the Italian writer Giani Stuparich.

In 1911, when he was thirty, Tedeschi committed suicide in front of his dying mother, Peppina Tedeschi.

== Works ==
One of Tedeschi's notable works was a review of Otto Weininger's Geschlecht und Charakter (1903), which – for some in Italy – became an alternative to Freudian psychoanalysis. While translating Grundzüge der allgemeinen Ästhetik into Italian, Tedeschi took his own life, just as Weininger had done in 1903. The text, which was completed by Mariano Graziussi, included three essays that explored Witasek's conceptualization of value and beauty. These were published as part of the introductory article called "La coscienza estetica secondo Stefano Witasek" ("The aesthetic consciousness according to Stefan Witasek").

Tedeschi also authored critical analyses of other thinkers. For example, he identified Otto Weininger as "the antifeminist philosopher", and credited him with developing a systematic critique of women and feminism, a theme that he said had been treated only vaguely by earlier writers such as Arthur Schopenhauer, Friedrich Nietzsche, and August Strindberg. In his examination of Witasek's conception of value and beauty, Tedeschi suggested that habit has immense potential for creating values and that it facilitates "the apperception of the produced representations", leading to enhanced enjoyment. Tedeschi considered himself a bridge between the Graz and the Florentine schools. Tedeschi's works were published in periodicals such as Cantoni, Cultura, Rivista di Psicologia., and Rivista d'Italia.

== Publications ==
- Tedeschi, Steno (1907). "La coscienza estetica secondo Stefano Witasek", La Cultura Filosofica, I, 5, pp. 128–135
- Tedeschi, Steno (1908). "Un'equivalente aprioristica della metafisica (la teoria degli oggetti)", Rivista filosofica, X, 11.3, pp. 289–303.
- Tedeschi, Steno. (1910). "Sulla funzione conoscitiva del giudizio", La Cultura Filosofica, IV. pp. 32–39.
- Tedeschi, Steno. (1912). "Intorno agli oggetti del pensiero", Rivista di Filosofia, IV, pp. 107–118.
