= Edward N. Zalta =

American philosopher (born 1952)

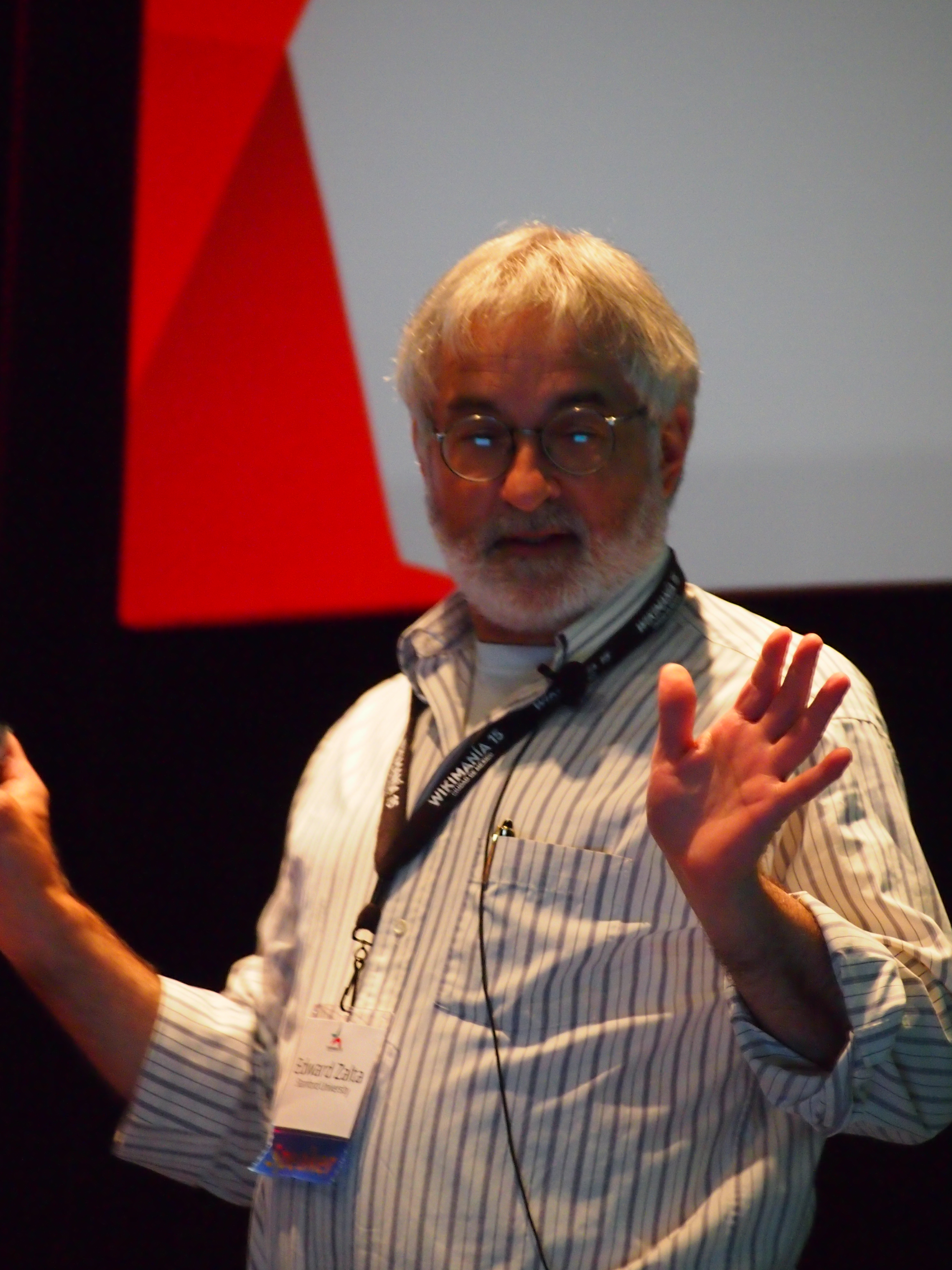
- Zalta speaking at the Wikimania 2015
- Born: Edward Nouri Zalta; March 16, 1952 (age 74)

Education
- Education: Rice University (BA); University of Massachusetts Amherst (PhD)
- Thesis: An Introduction to a Theory of Abstract Objects (1981)
- Doctoral advisor: Terence Parsons
- Other advisor: Barbara H. Partee

Philosophical work
- Era: Contemporary philosophy
- Region: Western philosophy
- School: Analytic philosophy; Mathematical platonism; Neo-logicism (Stanford–Edmonton school); Mathematical structuralism (abstract variety)
- Institutions: University of Auckland; Rice University; University of Salzburg; Stanford University
- Main interests: Metaphysics
- Notable ideas: Abstract object theory, exemplifying and encoding a property as two modes of predication, Platonized naturalism, computational metaphysics

Edward Nouri Zalta (/ˈzɔːltə/; born March 16, 1952) is an American philosopher who is a senior research scholar at the Center for the Study of Language and Information at Stanford University. He received his BA from Rice University in 1975 and his PhD from the University of Massachusetts Amherst in 1981, both in philosophy. Zalta has taught courses at Stanford University, Rice University, the University of Salzburg, and the University of Auckland. Zalta is also the Principal Editor of the Stanford Encyclopedia of Philosophy.

== Research ==
Edward N. Zalta. "The Stanford Encyclopedia of Philosophy: Issues Faced by Academic Reference Works That May Be of Interest to Wikipedians", Wikimania 2015, Mexico City.

Zalta's most notable philosophical position is descended from the positions of Alexius Meinong and Ernst Mally, who suggested that there are many non-existent objects. On Zalta's account, some objects (the ordinary concrete ones around us, like tables and chairs) exemplify properties, while others (abstract objects like numbers, and what others would call "non-existent objects", like the round square, and the mountain made entirely of gold) merely encode them.

While the objects that exemplify properties are discovered through traditional empirical means, a simple set of axioms allows us to know about objects that encode properties. For every set of properties, there is exactly one object that encodes exactly that set of properties and no others. This allows for a formalized ontology.
