= Stephan Witasek =

Austrian philosopher (1870–1915)

- Born: 17 May 1870; Vienna, Austria-Hungary
- Died: 18 April 1915 (aged 44); Graz, Austria-Hungary

Education
- Education: University of Graz (PhD, 1895; Dr. phil. hab., 1899)
- Thesis: Untersuchungen zur Complexions-Theorie (1895)
- Doctoral advisors: Alexius Meinong; Hugo Spitzer

Philosophical work
- Era: 19th-/20th-century philosophy
- Region: Western philosophy
- School: Graz school
- Institutions: University of Graz
- Notable students: Steno Tedeschi
- Main interests: Aesthetics; Experimental psychology; Philosophy of perception
- Notable ideas: Aesthetic properties as ideal and extra-objective

Stephan Witasek (German: [ˈviːtazɛk]; 17 May 1870 – 18 April 1915) was an Austrian philosopher noted for his contribution to the development of the Graz school. He is cited as the most talented psychologist of the school and was groomed as Alexius Meinong's successor. Witasek is noted for developing a theory of aesthetics within the Graz school's abstract object theory.

== Life ==
Witasek was born on May 17, 1870, in Vienna to Wenzel Johann Witasek and his wife Emilie née Egery. His father was a chief railway inspector while his mother, the second wife of Wenzel, was a daughter of a Hungarian civil servant. Witasek was the eldest of their two sons. When his father retired, the family moved to Graz. He obtained a doctorate in philosophy under Alexius Meinong at the University of Graz in 1895 after completing his study on complexion theory. Witasek became a scholar, a career which Rudolf Ameseder described as a meager life marked by hard work, poverty, and belated recognition. Although, he was known for serving as Meinong's private assistant for a decade on Austria's first psychological laboratory, Witasek would be credited for directing the facility's development only after his death.

Witasek married Alice Makowiczka in 1903, and they had two children, Alice and Georg. He died in 1915, and this contributed to the disintegration of the Graz school.

== Work ==
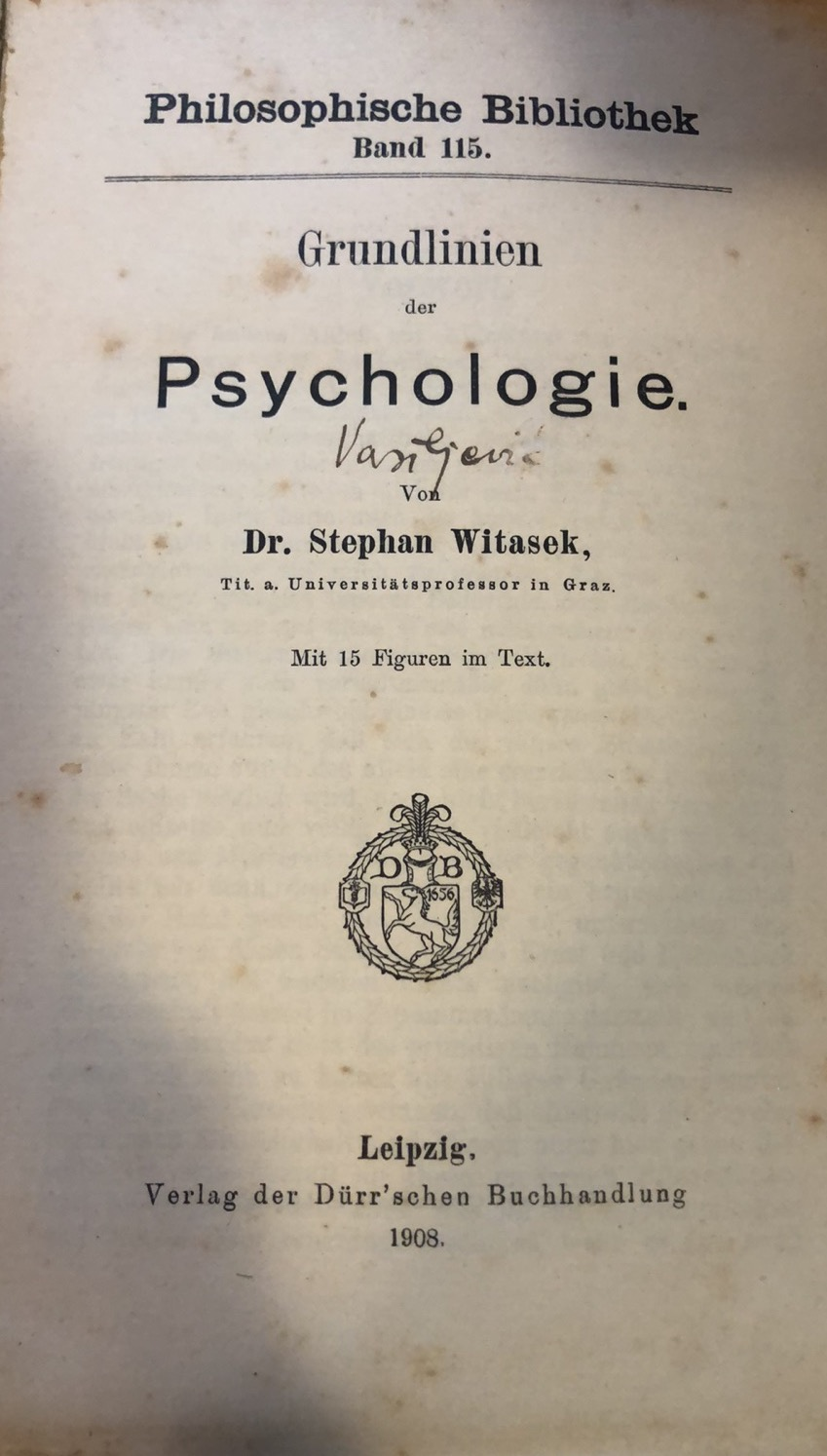
Grundlinien der Psychologie (1907)

Witasek is considered one of the most important representatives of the psychology of aesthetics alongside Theodor Lipps and Johannes Volkelt. His earliest works involved an investigation of the theoretical foundation for aesthetics. This was based on Gustav Fechner's studies, which challenged the idealistic and value-based approaches in aesthetics that prevailed then. Building on Meinong's work, Witasek developed his own psychological aesthetics, where aesthetic properties are considered ideal and extra-objective. This model links the aesthetic object to the subject's mental state. He also contributed to Meinong's work on complexion theory, particularly in the systematic knowledge of complexions. His investigation of Christian von Ehrenfels' instances of Gestaltqualitaten detailed how a polyphonic composition constitutes the different "voices", which are considered complexions.

One of the notable theories that Witasek pushed forward was his claim that pre-existing sensational elements create psychological products in the form of different perceptual configurations. He explored this idea further in collaboration with the Austrian-Italian psychologist, Vittorio Benussi, and the Austrian philosopher and psychologist, Alois Höfler. They were able to explain the process of generating perceptual configurations from the same sensory elements.

== Publications ==
- Grundzüge der allgemeinen Ästhetik (1904)
- Grundlinien der Psychologie (1907)
- Psychologisches zur ethischen Erziehung: Vortrag, gehalten in der XII. Versammlung der Österreichischen Gesellschaft für Kinderforschung in Wien am 13. Mai 1907 (1907)
- Psychologie der Raumwahrnehmung des Auges (1910)
- Principii di estetica generale (1912)
