= Benussi =

Benussi is an Italian surname. Notable people with the surname include:

- Femi Benussi (born 1945), Italian actress
- Francesco Benussi (born 1981), Italian footballer
- Vittorio Benussi (1878–1927), Austrian-Italian psychologist
