= Fritz Heider =

American/Austrian psychologist

- Born: 19 February 1896; Vienna, Austria-Hungary
- Died: 2 January 1988 (aged 91); Lawrence, Kansas, U.S.

Academic background
- Education: University of Graz
- Thesis: Zur Subjektivität der Sinnesqualitäten (On the subjectivity of sensory qualities) (1920)
- Doctoral advisor: Alexius Meinong

Academic work
- Discipline: Social psychology
- Sub-discipline: Social perception
- Institutions: University of Hamburg; Smith College; University of Kansas
- Notable works: The Psychology of Interpersonal Relations
- Notable ideas: Attribution theory

Fritz Heider (19 February 1896 – 2 January 1988) was an Austrian social psychologist whose work was related to the Gestalt school. In 1958, he published The Psychology of Interpersonal Relations, which expanded upon his creations of balance theory and attribution theory. This book presents a wide-ranging analysis of the conceptual framework and the psychological processes that influence human social perception (Malle, 2008). It took 15 years to complete; before it was completed, it had already circulated through a small group of social psychologists.

== Biography ==
Heider was born in Vienna on February 19, 1896, but he grew up in Graz. During his childhood, Heider sustained a serious eye injury which later turned him quite serious and shy in his adolescence. Because of his injury, Heider avoided the draft during World War I.

With his father's encouragement, Heider enrolled to study architecture at the University of Graz. After growing tired of studying architecture, Heider attempted to study law at Graz as well but eventually became tired of both subjects. Since he really liked to learn for its own sake, he struck a deal with his father and proceeded to audit courses at the university for four years. Gradually, he eventually became more interested in psychology and philosophy. At the age of 24 he received a Ph.D. from the University of Graz, for his innovative study of the causal structure of perception including his work on Thing and Medium on the psychology of perception. Afterwards, he traveled to Berlin, where he attended lectures at the Psychology Institute. There, Heider's studies focused on the Gestalt psychology of Wolfgang Koehler, Max Wertheimer and Kurt Lewin.

In 1927 he accepted a position at the University of Hamburg, whose faculty included the psychologist William Stern and Ernst Cassirer, the philosopher whose thinking on the role of theory in science had an important influence on Kurt Lewin.

In 1930, at the age of 34, Heider was offered an opportunity to conduct research at the Clarke School for the Deaf Northampton, Massachusetts, which was associated with Smith College, also in Northampton. This prospect was particularly attractive to him because Kurt Koffka, one of the founders of the Gestalt school of psychology, held a position at Smith College (Heider, 1983).

It was in Northampton that he met his wife Grace (née Moore). Grace was one of the first people Heider met in the United States. As an assistant to Koffka, she helped Heider find an apartment in Northampton and introduced him to the environs (Heider, 1983). They were married in 1930, and the marriage lasted for more than 50 years. The couple had three sons: Karl, John, and Stephan. His son Karl Heider went on to become an important contributor to visual anthropology and ethnographic film whereas his son John wrote the popular The Tao of Leadership.

In 1948, Heider was recruited to the University of Kansas, by social psychologist Roger Barker (Heider, 1983). He remained in Kansas for the remainder of his life. In 1983, Heider documented his personal and career developments and achievements in his autobiography The Life of a Psychologist: An Autobiography. He died at his home in Lawrence, Kansas, on 2 January 1988 at the age of 91. His intellectual legacy still lives on. His wife of 57 years, Grace, died in 1995. His son John died in 2010.

== Work ==
Heider published two important articles in 1944 that pioneered the concepts of social perception and causal attribution: Social perception and phenomenal causality, and, with co-author Marianne Simmel, An experimental study of apparent behavior. Heider would publish little else for the next 14 years.

In 1958, at the University of Kansas, Heider published his most famous work, which remains his most significant contribution to the field of social psychology. The Psychology of Interpersonal Relations was written in collaboration with the uncredited Beatrice Wright, a founder of rehabilitation psychology. Wright was available to collaborate because the University of Kansas's nepotism rules prohibited her from a position at the university (her husband, Erik Wright, was a professor), and the Ford Foundation gave Heider funds and assistance to complete the project. (Wright is credited only in the foreword; she later went on to become an endowed professor of psychology at the University of Kansas). In his book, Heider presented a wide-ranging analysis of the conceptual framework and the psychological processes that undergird human social perception.

The Psychology of Interpersonal Relations pioneered attribution theory. A giant of social psychology, Heider had few students, but his book on social perception had many readers, and its impact continues into the 21st Century, having been cited over 26,000 times. Heider introduced two theories that correspond to his two articles from 1944: attribution theory and cognitive balance. The Psychology of Interpersonal Relations illuminates a sophisticated approach toward naive or common-sense psychology.

In The Psychology of Interpersonal Relations, Heider argued that social perception follows many of the same rules of physical object perception, and that the organization found in object perception is also found in social perception. Because biases in object perception sometimes lead to errors (e.g., optical illusions), one might expect to find that biases in social perception likewise lead to errors (e.g., underestimating the role social factors and overestimating the effect of personality and attitudes on behavior).

Heider also argued that perceptual organization follows the rule of psychological balance. Although tedious to spell out in completeness, the idea is that positive and negative sentiments need to be represented in ways that minimize ambivalence and maximize a simple, straightforward effective representation of the person. He writes "To conceive of a person as having positive and negative traits requires a more sophisticated view; it requires a differentiation of the representation of the person into subparts that are of unlike value (1958, p. 182)."

But the most influential idea in The Psychology of Interpersonal Relations is the notion of how people see the causes of behavior, and the explanations they make for it—what Heider called "attributions".

Attribution theory (as one part of the larger and more complex Heiderian account of social perception) describes how people come to explain (make attributions about) the behavior of others and themselves. Behavior is attributed to a disposition (e.g., personality traits, motives, attitudes), or behavior can be attributed to situations (e.g., external pressures, social norms, peer pressure, accidents of the environment, acts of God, random chance, etc.) Heider first made the argument that people tend to overweight internal, dispositional causes over external causes—this later became known as the fundamental attribution error (Ross, 1977) or correspondence bias (Fiske & Taylor, 1991; Jones, 1979, 1990).

Although he published little else, he kept voluminous notebooks which contained his reflections on psychology. These were subsequently edited in six volumes by Marijana Benesh-Weiner, a former student of Heider, who worked with Heider in organizing the collection for publication.(Heider & Benesh-Weiner, 1987a, 1987b, 1988, 1989a, 1989b, 1990).

== The cognition–emotion linkage ==
Although Fritz Heider's notebooks do not contain a specific theory on emotions, his notes do contain evidence of his beliefs on a cognition-emotion link and a fundamental logic that underlies all experiences of emotional states. Heider also points out that emotions may influence or alter cognitive states among some people. Heider also offered many definitions of emotional states and key properties that characterized these states. The emotions which Heider had a particular interest in are those which are considered interpersonal such as: anger and vengeance, sorrow and pity, gratitude, love, envy and jealousy. Heider primarily argued that in cases where one's fundamental logic appears to be contradicted by something else, a much fuller analysis of the particular situation must take place.

In relation to anger, Heider's notes consider cases in which a violated "ought" was to be a critical component in the arousal of anger and then follow an observation of the emotional reaction produced once that component is met. He notes how anger and annoyance create a paradox when someone feels social pressure to do what they know they "ought" to do. Heider considers this a paradox because within his general theory of balance, two forces acting in agreement should form a balanced structure and balanced structures should in turn produce positive rather than negative effects. Force one is social pressure and force two is the "ought" force, which both act in the same direction. The direction of the two forces should create harmony but in turn they create the opposite. Heider noted that the feeling of violation, particular to that of a violated "ought", was a cognitive antecedent that characterized angered states. However, he also noted that cognition does not always seem to be a necessary condition for producing anger.

In relation to gratitude, Heider also points out necessary antecedents. He states that gratitude depends not only on receiving help but also on the perception of the intent of the help received as well as the perceived reason for the positive intent which has the power to modify and influence the causal attribution. Heider mentions that the need for one to maintain balanced states can affect the experience of gratitude as well as other emotions. In his notebook, he raises the question of why someone might be hesitant to accept a gift from a hated individual and later goes on to explain how one would rather keep the hatred felt toward the individual than have to mix it up with gratitude.

In addition to the work mentioned above, Heider explains how there seems to be some cognitive schema that has both a general and pervasive influence which led to the simplification of perception. In his notebook, Heider explains how people have a tendency to believe in the equalization of the future. Individuals who hold the idea of a "constant sum", have a skewed view of their life experiences. Heider argued that this skewed pervading cognitive schemas lead to a simplification of life experiences. In his final notes on emotions, Heider recognizes a bidirectional influence between thought and affect stating that emotions alter cognition but there is also a possibility that emotions may also arouse needs.

== Impact ==
There have been many reviews of his work. Others include the work by Miles Hewstone published in 1989. and the review published in the Review of General Psychology in 2007.

== Awards ==
- 1987: Gold Medal for Scholarly Accomplishment in Psychological Science, American Psychological Foundation
- 1981: Honorary doctorate, University of Graz
- 1981: Admission to the American Academy of Arts and Sciences
- 1965: APA Award for Distinguished Scientific Contributions to Psychology, American Psychological Association
- 1959: Kurt Lewin Award, Society for the Psychological Study of Social Issues

== Key works ==
- Heider, F (1944). "Social perception and phenomenal causality". Psychological Review. 51 (6): 358–374. doi:10.1037/h0055425.
- Heider, F; Simmel, M (1944). "An experimental study of apparent behavior". American Journal of Psychology. 57 (2): 243–259. doi:10.2307/1416950. JSTOR 1416950.
- Heider, F. (1958). The psychology of interpersonal relations. New York: John Wiley & Sons.
- Heider, F. (1983). The life of a psychologist: An autobiography. Lawrence, KS: University of Kansas Press.
- Heider, F., and M. Benesh-Weiner. (1987-1990). Fritz Heider: The Notebooks: Volumes 1-6. Springer. ISBN 978-0387912998

== See also ==
- Graz school

== Sources ==
- Department of Psychology, History, University of Kansas, https://web.archive.org/web/20140101132543/http://psych.ku.edu/about/history/1938-1948.shtml
- Fiske, S.T., & Taylor, S.E. (1991). Social cognition (2nd ed.). New York: McGraw-Hill.
