= Johannes Volkelt =

German philosopher (1848–1930)

Johannes Immanuel Volkelt (21 July 1848, Kunzendorf, Galicia – 8 May 1930, Leipzig) was a German neo-Kantian philosopher.

== Biography ==
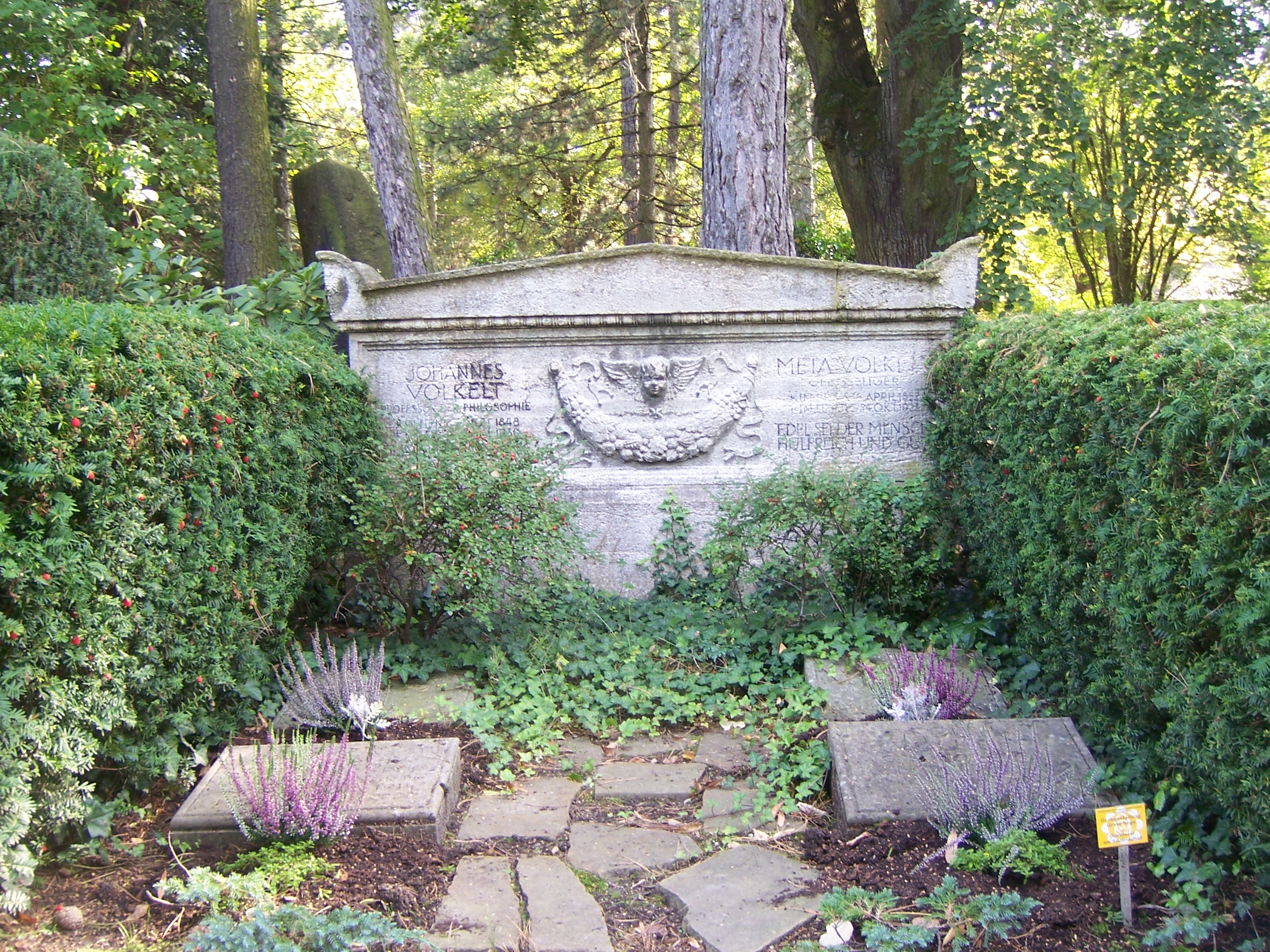
Gravesite of Johannes Volkelt and relatives at Südfriedhof (Leipzig)

He was educated at Vienna, Jena, and Leipzig. At Jena, he was a student of Kant scholar Kuno Fischer. At Leipzig, Volkelt's doctoral advisor was Hermann Lotze.

Volkelt became professor of philosophy at Basel in 1883 and at Würzburg in 1889, and 1894 was made professor of philosophy and pedagogy at Leipzig.

== Philosophy ==
In philosophy, his main efforts have been his opposition to positivism and his attempt at a new metaphysical theory. His independent position was arrived at after successive periods in which he followed Hegel, Schopenhauer, and Hartmann.

Alongside Theodor Lipps and Stephan Witasek, he is considered one of the most important representatives of the psychology of aesthetics. He is particularly noted for his investigations of the concept of empathy as a fundamental principle of the theory of art. He proposed that experiencing a work of art with empathy has two variations: "proper empathy" (eigentliche Einfühlung) and "empathy of mood" (Stimmungseinfühlung). His thoughts on Einfühlung and the empathic process were documented in his work System der Ästhetik.

== Dream interpretation ==
Volkelt spent time analysing the meaning of dreams, and captured his analysis in Die Traumphantasie. He is cited several times in The Interpretation of Dreams as a foundation for Sigmund Freud's claims.

Volkelt believed that elements of a dream were directly related to the body of the dreamer, such as a dreamed roaring stove representing the dreamer's lungs.

== Works ==
His more important works are:

- Pantheismus und Individualismus im Systeme Spinoza's (1872) – Digital version
- Die Traumphantasie (1875)
- Kants Erkenntnistheorie, a searching piece of criticism (1879)
- Erfahrung und Denken. Kritische Grundlegung der Erkenntnistheorie became a standard textbook on epistemology, especially due to its thorough examination of the concept of 'experience'. (Hamburg and Leipzig, 1886) Reprinted with introduction and Index by Harald Schwaetzer 2000.
- Aesthetische Zeitfragen (1895)
- Arthur Schopenhauer, seine Persönlichkeit, seine Lehre, sein Glaube (1900)
- Die Kunst des Individualisierens in den Dichtungen Jean Pauls (1902)
- System der Aesthetik (1905—14)
- Phänomenologie und Metaphysik der Zeit (1925)
