= Vittorio Benussi =

Austrian-Italian psychologist

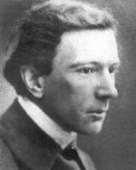
- Born: 17 January 1878; Trieste, Austria-Hungary
- Died: 24 November 1927 (aged 49); Padua, Kingdom of Italy

Education
- Education: University of Graz (PhD, 1901)
- Doctoral advisor: Alexius Meinong

Philosophical work
- Era: 20th-century philosophy
- Region: Western philosophy
- School: Graz school Austrian school of act psychology Austrian realism
- Institutions: University of Graz; University of Padua
- Main interests: Experimental psychology; Gestalt psychology; Psychophysics; Perception
- Notable ideas: Lie detection through respiratory measurements

Vittorio Benussi (17 January 1878 – 24 November 1927) was an Austrian-Italian psychologist.

== Life and career ==
Vittorio Benussi was an Austrian-Italian psychologist born on 17 January 1878 in Trieste. Antonelli (2018) describes him as an unknown but important figure who lived a "rich, but tragic life,". At the age of 18, Benussi moved to Italy, where he earned money by working at the library in the Graz school of Gestalt theory. Soon after, Benussi became an assistant in Alexius Meinong’s laboratory and decided to conduct his own psychological research. He studied alongside Meinong, where he was introduced to object theory, a crucial development toward Gestalt theory. Benussi was also introduced to famous psychologist Franz Brentano’s theory of descriptive psychology during his time in Graz. Founded by Franz Brentano, act psychology places emphasis on how the mind functions as opposed to what it is made up of. As Edwin Boring notes, "When one sees a color, the color itself is not mental. It is the seeing, the act, that is mental." He is arguably most well known for being the founder of the Italian Gestalt movement as well as his research on emotional autonomy.

In his work, Benussi conducted numerous studies on optical illusions, visual and haptic perception, spatial perception, as well as the perception of time. He also developed one of the first lie detection tests. Benussi was also credited with extensively studying unconscious mental phenomena including dreams, and the body's influence on emotions of the mind, in addition to mental analysis and hypnosis. Together with Stephan Witasek and Alois Höfler, Benussi explored the process of generating perceptual configurations from the same sensory elements.

Emotional functional autonomy was at the core of Benussi's mental studies and emphasized the interconnection between intellectual and emotional functions of the brain. He believed that intellectual and emotional functions did not exist independently of our reactions, and he connected those brain functions to emotional life's thoughts and images. However, this conclusion refuted one of the basic assumptions of traditional psychology, which is that emotional life is based on reasoning. Throughout his interest in Freudian psychology, Benussi made theoretical discoveries of the field of psychoanalysis adaptable to experimental tests. Benussi invented sonno base, a hypnotic state meaning ‘basic sleep’. He did this out of the belief that emotional states emerge in pure, isolated forms while sleeping. For Benussi, basic sleep demonstrated that intellectual life could fade without consciousness doing the same. How participants described their state after waking up led Benussi to attempt to elicit emotional states during hypnosis without relying on references to thoughts or images. This hypnotic state was considered by Biagio Tassone as what “very well may be Benussi’s greatest achievement in advancing descriptive psychology,”. He adopts the term mental functions to describe mental phenomena and psychological functions of organisms. Then, he uses hypnotism on participants to study the conditions of these mental functions. Out of the three participants he hypnotized, Margherita Signorelli was the most successful. Her case confirmed emotional autonomy in specific mental states of consciousness and a relationship between intentional mental processes and nonintentional ones. Benussi discovered that while she was hypnotized, he could make suggestions and give various instructions about what he wanted Signorelli to focus on when she awoke. First, he placed her in a deep sleep and suggested she focus on a pure feeling, hatred, for example, which allowed her to possess genuine feelings of hate. However, the feeling of hatred is not perceived as hatred directed at someone or something. When she snapped out of it, she vividly described 44 emotions based on the suggestions made by the psychologist, not connected to any objective fact.

Benussi's work was intersectional enough to be generalized to fields of contemporary neurosciences, biology, pragmatics, as well as phenomenology and enactivism. He became an Italian citizen after World War I and unfortunately lost his librarian position in Graz after Italy declared Trieste a new territory. Benussi was forced to move from Graz to Padua. He began a new life there and was hired as a professor at the University. During this period, Benussi extended his idea of the internal conditions of perception and discussed “three key classes of internal determinants: Assimilative functions, "figural" or "connecting functions" and "identity functions" or "functions of mental identification". This research led to new advancements in kinesthetic awareness and the understanding of emotions and ultimately led to Benussi's research on testimonial accuracy during his Graz period.

== Death ==
Despite his successes, Benussi developed serious depression and committed suicide by drinking cyanide in 1927 at the age of 49. He claimed to have died the same way in a dream he had years prior.
