= Franz Brentano =

Austrian Catholic priest and philosopher (1838–1917)

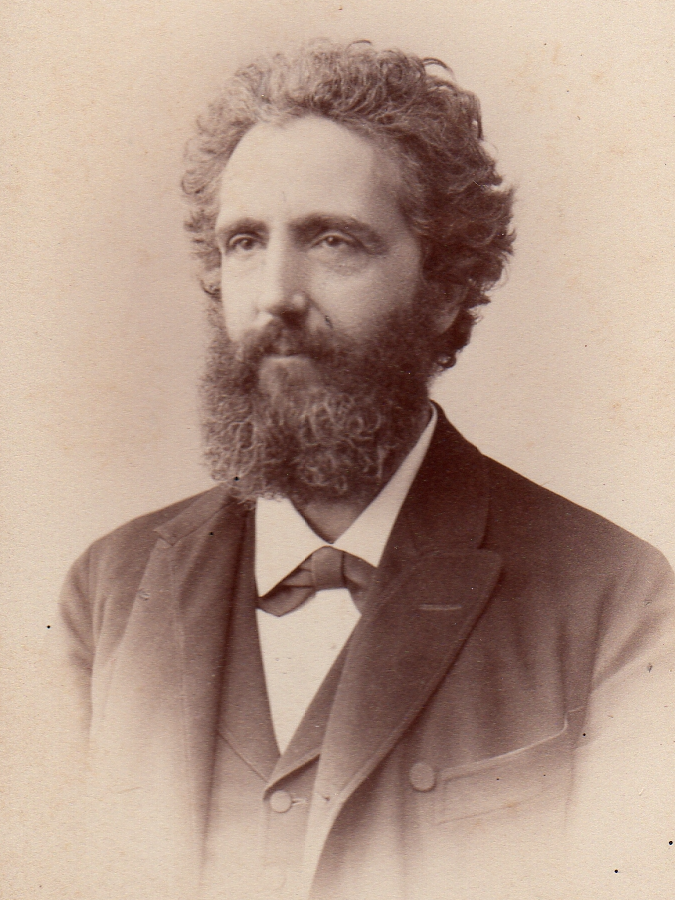
- Brentano in 1890
- Born: Franz Clemens Honoratus Hermann Josef Brentano; 16 January 1838; Marienberg am Rhein, Rhineland, Prussia, German Confederation
- Died: 17 March 1917 (aged 79); Zürich, Switzerland
- Spouses: Ida Lieben (m. 1880–1894; her death); Emilie Rueprecht (m. 1897–1917; his death)

Education
- Education: Ludwig-Maximilians-Universität München; Friedrich Wilhelm University of Berlin; University of Münster; University of Tübingen (PhD, 1862); University of Würzburg (Dr. phil. hab., 1866)
- Theses: Von der mannigfachen Bedeutung des Seienden nach Aristoteles (On the Several Senses of Being in Aristotle) (1862); Die Psychologie des Aristoteles, insbesondere seine Lehre vom Nous Poietikos (The Psychology of Aristotle, in Particular His Doctrine of the Active Intellect) (1867)
- Doctoral advisor: Franz Jakob Clemens
- Other advisor: Adolf Trendelenburg

Philosophical work
- Era: 19th-century philosophy
- Region: Western philosophy
- School: School of Brentano; Aristotelianism; Intentionalism; Empirical psychology Austrian phenomenology Austrian realism
- Institutions: University of Würzburg (1866–1873); University of Vienna (1873–1895)
- Doctoral students: Tomáš Masaryk
- Notable students: Christian von Ehrenfels, Sigmund Freud, Alois Höfler, Edmund Husserl, Anton Marty, Alexius Meinong, Rudolf Steiner, Carl Stumpf, Kazimierz Twardowski
- Main interests: Ontology; Psychology
- Notable ideas: Intentionality; Intentional object; Distinction between genetic and empirical/descriptive psychology; Distinction between sensory and noetic consciousness (presentations of sensory objects or intuitions versus thinking of concepts); Judgement–predication distinction; Time-consciousness

Ecclesiastical career
- Religion: Christianity
- Church: Catholic Church
- Ordained: 6 August 1864
- Laicized: 1873

Franz Clemens Honoratus Hermann Josef Brentano (/brɛnˈtɑːnoʊ/; German: [bʁɛnˈtaːno]; 16 January 1838 – 17 March 1917) was a German philosopher and psychologist. His 1874 Psychology from an Empirical Standpoint, considered his magnum opus, is credited with having reintroduced the medieval scholastic concept of intentionality into contemporary philosophy.

Originally a Catholic priest, Brentano withdrew from the priesthood in 1873 due to the dogmatic definition of papal infallibility in Pastor aeternus. Working subsequently as a non-denominational professor, his teaching triggered research in a wide array of fields such as linguistics, logic, mathematics and experimental psychology through the young generation of philosophers who were gathered as the School of Brentano.

== Life ==
Brentano was born at Marienberg am Rhein, near Boppard. He was son of Christian Brentano, brother of Lujo Brentano, and paternal nephew of Clemens Brentano and Bettina von Arnim, and of Gunda (née Brentano) and Friedrich von Savigny. His paternal grandfather was of Italian descent, and some of his ancestors are Sophie von La Roche and Johann Philipp Stadion, Count von Warthausen.

He studied philosophy at the Ludwig-Maximilians-Universität München, the University of Würzburg, the Friedrich Wilhelm University of Berlin (with Adolf Trendelenburg) and the University of Münster. He had a special interest in Aristotle and scholastic philosophy. He wrote his dissertation in 1862 at Tübingen under the title Von der mannigfachen Bedeutung des Seienden nach Aristoteles (On the Several Senses of Being in Aristotle). His thesis advisor was Franz Jakob Clemens. Subsequently, he began to study theology and entered the seminary in Munich and then Würzburg. He was ordained a Catholic priest on 6 August 1864.

In 1866, he defended his habilitation thesis, Die Psychologie des Aristoteles, insbesondere seine Lehre vom Nous Poietikos (The Psychology of Aristotle, in Particular His Doctrine of the Active Intellect, published 1867), and began to lecture at the University of Würzburg. His students in this period included, among others, Carl Stumpf and Anton Marty. Between 1870 and 1873, Brentano was heavily involved in the debate on papal infallibility in matters of Faith. A strong opponent of such dogma, he eventually gave up his priesthood and his tenure in 1873. He remained, however, deeply religious and dealt with the topic of the existence of God in lectures given at the University of Würzburg and the University of Vienna.

In 1874, Brentano published his major work, Psychology from an Empirical Standpoint. From 1874 to 1895, he taught at the University of Vienna, Austria-Hungary. Among his students were Edmund Husserl, Sigmund Freud, Tomáš Masaryk, Rudolf Steiner, Alexius Meinong, Carl Stumpf, Anton Marty, Kazimierz Twardowski, and Christian von Ehrenfels and many others (see School of Brentano for more details). While he began his career as a full ordinary professor, he was forced to give up both his Austrian citizenship and his professorship in 1880 in order to marry Ida Lieben (Austro-Hungarian law denied matrimony to persons who had been ordained priests even if they later had resigned from priesthood), but he was permitted to stay at the university only as a Privatdozent. After the departure of Twardowski back to Lwów and the death of his wife in 1894, Brentano retired and moved to Florence in 1896, where he married his second wife, Emilie Ruprecht, in 1897. He transferred to Zürich at the outbreak of the First World War, where he died in 1917.

== Work ==
=== Intentionality ===
Brentano is best known for his reintroduction of the concept of intentionality—a concept derived from scholastic philosophy—to contemporary philosophy in his lectures and in his work Psychologie vom empirischen Standpunkt (Psychology from an Empirical Standpoint). While often simplistically summarised as "aboutness" or the relationship between mental acts and the external world, Brentano defined it as the main characteristic of mental phenomena, by which they could be distinguished from physical phenomena. Every mental phenomenon, every psychological act has content, is directed at an object (the intentional object). Every belief, desire etc. has an object that they are about: the believed, the desired. Brentano used the expression "intentional inexistence" to indicate the status of the objects of thought in the mind. The property of being intentional, of having an intentional object, was the key feature to distinguish psychological phenomena and physical phenomena, because, as Brentano defined it, physical phenomena lacked the ability to generate original intentionality, and could only facilitate an intentional relationship in a second-hand manner, which he labeled derived intentionality.

Every mental phenomenon is characterized by what the Scholastics of the Middle Ages called the intentional (or mental) inexistence of an object, and what we might call, though not wholly unambiguously, reference to a content, direction towards an object (which is not to be understood here as meaning a thing), or immanent objectivity. Every mental phenomenon includes something as object within itself, although they do not all do so in the same way. In presentation something is presented, in judgement something is affirmed or denied, in love loved, in hate hated, in desire desired and so on. This intentional in-existence is characteristic exclusively of mental phenomena. No physical phenomenon exhibits anything like it. We could, therefore, define mental phenomena by saying that they are those phenomena which contain an object intentionally within themselves. — Franz Brentano, Psychology from an Empirical Standpoint, edited by Linda L. McAlister (London: Routledge, 1995 [1874]), pp. 88–89.

Brentano introduced a distinction between genetic psychology (genetische Psychologie) and descriptive psychology (beschreibende or deskriptive Psychologie): in his terminology, genetic psychology is the study of psychological phenomena from a third-person point of view, which involves the use of empirical experiments, thereby satisfying the scientific standards we nowadays expect of an empirical science. (This concept is roughly equivalent to what is now called empirical psychology, cognitive science, or "heterophenomenology", an explicitly third-person, scientific approach to the study of consciousness.) The aim of descriptive psychology, on the other hand, is to describe consciousness from a first-person point of view. The latter approach was further developed by Husserl and the phenomenological tradition.

=== Theory of perception ===
He is also well known for claiming that Wahrnehmung ist Falschnehmung ('perception is misconception') that is to say perception is erroneous. In fact he maintained that external, sensory perception could not tell us anything about the de facto existence of the perceived world, which could simply be illusion. However, we can be absolutely sure of our internal perception. When I hear a tone, I cannot be completely sure that there is a tone in the real world, but I am absolutely certain that I do hear. This awareness, of the fact that I hear, is called internal perception. External perception, sensory perception, can only yield hypotheses about the perceived world, but not truth. Hence he and many of his pupils (in particular Carl Stumpf and Edmund Husserl) thought that the natural sciences could only yield hypotheses and never universal, absolute truths as in pure logic or mathematics.

However, in a reprinting of his Psychologie vom Empirischen Standpunkte (Psychology from an Empirical Standpoint), he recanted this previous view. He attempted to do so without reworking the previous arguments within that work but it has been said that he was wholly unsuccessful. The new view states that when we hear a sound, we hear something from the external world; there are no physical phenomena of internal perception.

=== Theory of judgment ===
Brentano has a theory of judgment which is different from what is currently the predominant (Fregean) view. At the centre of Brentano's theory of judgment lies the idea that a judgment depends on having a presentation, but this presentation does not have to be predicated. Even stronger: Brentano thought that predication is not even necessary for judgment, because there are judgments without a predicational content. Another fundamental aspect of his theory is that judgments are always existential. This so-called existential claim implies that someone who is judging that S is P will be judging that some S that is P exists. (Note that Brentano denied the idea that all judgments are of the form: S is P [and all other kinds of judgment which combine presentations]. Brentano argued that there are also judgments arising from a single presentation, e.g. the planet Mars exists” has only one presentation.) In Brentano's own symbols, a judgment is always of the form: ‘+A’ (A exists) or ‘–A’ (A does not exist).

Combined with the third fundamental claim of Brentano, the idea that all judgments are either positive (judging that A exists) or negative (judging that A does not exist), we have a complete picture of Brentano's theory of judgment. So, imagine that you doubt whether giraffes exist. At that point you have a presentation of giraffes in your mind. When you judge that giraffes do not exist, then you are judging that the presentation you have does not present something that exists. You do not have to utter that in words or otherwise predicate that judgment. The whole judgment takes place in the denial (or approval) of the existence of the presentation you have.

The problem of Brentano's theory of judgment is not the idea that all judgments are existential judgments (though it is sometimes a very complex enterprise to transform an ordinary judgment into an existential one), the real problem is that Brentano made no distinction between object and presentation. A presentation exists as an object in your mind. So you cannot really judge that A does not exist, because if you do so you also judge that the presentation is not there (which is impossible, according to Brentano's idea that all judgments have the object which is judged as presentation). Kazimierz Twardowski acknowledged this problem and solved it by denying that the object is equal to the presentation. This is actually only a change within Brentano's theory of perception, but has a welcome consequence for the theory of judgment, viz. that you can have a presentation (which exists) but at the same time judge that the object does not exist.

== Legacy ==
The young Martin Heidegger was very much inspired by Brentano's early work On the Several Senses of Being in Aristotle. Brentano's focus on conscious (or phenomenal) intentionality was inherited by Carl Stumpf's Berlin school of experimental psychology, Anton Marty's Prague School of linguistics, Alexius Meinong's Graz school of experimental psychology, Kazimierz Twardowski's Lwów School of philosophy, and Edmund Husserl's phenomenology. Brentano's work also influenced George Stout, the teacher of G. E. Moore and Bertrand Russell at the University of Cambridge.

== Bibliography ==
Major works in German

- (1862) On the Several Senses of Being in Aristotle (Von der mannigfachen Bedeutung des Seienden nach Aristoteles (doctoral thesis)) (online)
- (1867) The Psychology of Aristotle (Die Psychologie des Aristoteles, insbesondere seine Lehre vom Nous Poietikos (habilitation thesis written in 1865/66)) (online)
- (1874) Psychology from an Empirical Standpoint (Psychologie vom empirischen Standpunkt) (online)
  - (1924–25) Psychologie vom empirischen Standpunkt. Ed. Oskar Kraus, 2 vols. Leipzig: Meiner. ISBN 3-7873-0014-7
- (1876) Was für ein Philosoph manchmal Epoche macht (a work against Plotinus) (online)
- (1889) The Origin of our Knowledge of Right and Wrong (Vom Ursprung sittlicher Erkenntnis) (1902 English edition online)
- (1911) Aristotle and his World View (Aristoteles und seine Weltanschauung)
- (1911) The Classification of Mental Phenomena (Von der Klassifikation der psychischen Phänomene)
- (1930) The True and the Evident (Wahrheit und Evidenz)
- (1976) Philosophical Investigations on Space, Time and Phenomena (Philosophische Untersuchungen zu Raum, Zeit und Kontinuum)
- (1982) Descriptive Psychology (Deskriptive Psychologie)

Collected Works

- Sämtliche veröffentlichte Schriften in zehn Bänden (Collected Works in Ten Volumes, edited by Arkadiusz Chrudzimski and Thomas Binder), Frankfurt: Ontos Verlag (now Walter de Gruyter).
  - 1. Psychologie vom empirischen Standpunkte — Von der Klassifikation der psychischen Phänomene (2008)
  - 2. Untersuchungen zur Sinnespsychologie (2009)
  - 3. Schriften zur Ethik und Ästhetik (2010)
  - 4. Von der mannigfachen Bedeutung des Seienden nach Aristoteles (2014)

== See also ==
- Analytic psychology (Dilthey)
- Analytic psychology (Stout)
- Axiological ethics
- Anna von Lieben (his sister-in-law)
- Robert von Lieben (his nephew)
- List of Austrian scientists
- List of Austrians
