= Christian von Ehrenfels =

Austrian philosopher (1859–1932)

- Born: Maria Christian Julius Leopold Freiherr von Ehrenfels; 20 June 1859; Rodaun near Vienna, Austrian Empire
- Died: 8 September 1932 (aged 73); Lichtenau, Austria

Education
- Education: University of Vienna; University of Graz (PhD, 1885)
- Doctoral advisor: Alexius Meinong
- Other advisor: Franz Brentano

Philosophical work
- Era: 19th-century philosophy
- Region: Western philosophy
- School: School of Brentano; Graz School; Gestalt psychology
- Institutions: University of Vienna; German University of Prague
- Main interests: Philosophy of psychology
- Notable ideas: Gestalt psychology, Gestalt qualities, polygyny as eugenic social policy

Christian von Ehrenfels (Austrian German: [ˈeːrənfɛls]; born Maria Christian Julius Leopold Freiherr von Ehrenfels; 20 June 1859 – 8 September 1932) was an Austrian philosopher, and is known as one of the founders and precursors of Gestalt psychology.

== Early life ==
Maria Christian Julius Leopold Freiherr von Ehrenfels was born on 20 June 1859 in Rodaun near Vienna and grew up at his father's castle Brunn am Walde in Lower Austria. He joined secondary school in Krems and first studied at the Hochschule für Bodenkultur in Vienna and then changed to the University of Vienna.

There he studied philosophy, was a pupil of Franz Brentano and Alexius Meinong. He earned his doctorate under the supervision of Meinong, following him after his move to the Karl-Franzens-Universität (Graz), in 1885 on the topic of Größenrelationen und Zahlen – Eine psychologische Studie ("Relations of magnitude and numbers: A psychological study"). He obtained his habilitation in 1888 at Vienna with the work Über Fühlen und Wollen ("On feeling and willing"). From 1896 to 1929 he was a professor of philosophy at the German University of Prague. Interested in his lectures were among others Max Brod, Franz Kafka and Felix Weltsch.

== Gestalt psychology ==
The idea of Gestalt has its roots in theories of Johann Wolfgang von Goethe and Ernst Mach. Max Wertheimer is to be credited as the founder of the movement of Gestalt psychology. The concept of Gestalt itself was first introduced in contemporary philosophy and psychology by Ehrenfels in his famous work Über Gestaltqualitäten (On the Qualities of Form, 1890). Both he and Edmund Husserl seem to have been inspired by Mach's work Beiträge zur Analyse der Empfindungen (Contributions to the Analysis of the Sensations, 1886) to formulate their very similar concepts of Gestalt and figural moment respectively. Ehrenfels' Gestaltqualitaten also influenced Stephan Witasek's investigations on complexion theory.

His analysis of the transition of a melody to another key became famous. Ehrenfels explained that a melody consists of individual sounds, but that it is considerably more than the sum of these notes. The individual notes would be able to join themselves for completely different melodies, while the melody would remain the same, if transposed into another key and containing single tones. This new opinion, that came up to a “perception of the whole” compared to its “parts” Ehrenfels called Gestaltqualitäten (figure qualities). (Compare with: Aristotle (trans. 1952) “In the case of all things that have several parts and in which the whole is not like a heap, but is a particular something besides the parts, there must be some such uniting factor”.)

== Sexual ethics ==
=== Monogamy and polygamy ===
Ehrenfels argued in numerous cultural-scientific and sexual-political writings against monogamy and for the utopia of a polygynian social order. He defended the opinion that monogamy would hinder a Darwinistic reproduction-logic and procreation-selection, which would have a devastating effect on society in a cultural-biological way and therefore monogamy should be combated. With those theories, Ehrenfels exposed himself to massive criticism, because he offered with his theories unimaginable thoughts to contemporary Western conventions. The basis of Ehrenfels's thinking about a new sexual order were expressed in a series of essays published in several academic journals in Germany and Austria between 1902 and 1910. In his essays, Ehrenfels began with the argument that men are not naturally monogamous, and that monogamy was something that had come to Europe with Christianity. Ehrenfels's starting point was that with many species of animals such as whales, walruses, elephants, lions, etc., the strongest male has a harem, which for him was sufficient proof that this was what nature had intended for humanity. Ehrenfels stated that though monogamy had some useful functions such as the "iron discipline" it imposed on European men, on the whole Europeans had suffered terribly from the unnatural condition of monogamy, which had seriously interfered with the Darwinian progress of ensuring the survival of the fittest (Ehrenfels was an avid social Darwinist). Ehrenfels believed polygamy was what nature had intended for men as it allowed the "fittest" men to father as many children as possible with as many women as possible in a process of "virile selection".

Ehrenfels wrote with disgust that monogamy was "that type of sexual life...that corresponded to the needs and capacities of women, at the cost of men". By contrast, Ehrenfels believed that women were naturally monogamous, and that all that women desired was one good husband to look after them. Ehrenfels further believed that all social problems were caused by an unnatural state of Christian monogamy, which caused a "splitting" between a man's "day consciousness" when he professed to believe in Christian marriage, and his "night consciousness", when a man's naturally aggressive, animistic sex drive come into play. Ehrenfels argued that this "splitting" within men between their "day consciousness" and "night consciousness" caused men all sorts of psychological trauma, and led to men acting in irrational, often violent ways. The specific example of the sort of male irrationality brought up by Enrenfels concerning this "splitting" was that of men abusing the prostitutes they visited.

Additionally, Ehrenfels argued this psychological "splitting" led to men to treat their wives badly as men were forced into the unnatural condition of monogamy, and that the feminist movement and the entire "Women's Question" had arisen as a response; Enrenfels believed the "Women's Question" would naturally resolve itself if only husbands would learn to treat their wives better. Finally, Ehrenfels argued that the monogamy was at the root to the "Social Question" (by which meant Ehrenfels meant the rise of the Austrian Social Democratic Party) as it encouraged men to leave their fortunes to their children, something that Ehrenfels believed to be natural, but also something that "very often contradicts the demands of social justice". As a result of wealth being spread by "privilegistic" means as opposed to "meritocratic" means, the poor felt resentment and were voting for socialist parties, which promised to abolish inequality. Ehrenfels believed that humanity was naturally unequal, and the demand for universal human equality had to be fought as it is totally unnatural. In a 1908 essay, the proud aristocrat Baron von Ehrenfels called the demand for universal equality in the Austrian Empire being made by the Social Democrats "preposterous".

=== Yellow Peril ===
Moreover, Ehrenfels was obsessed with the fear of the "Yellow Peril", and believed that Asian peoples were a deadly threat to European civilization. Ehrenfels wrote if nothing was done to stop the rise of China, that "if there is no change in current practice, this will lead to the annihilation of the white race by the yellow race".

In April 1895, the German Emperor Wilhelm II had a nightmare where all the nations of Europe appeared as "prehistoric warrior goddesses" who were protected by Germany which took the form of the Archangel Michael. To the East, they were threatened by a dark, stormy cloud in which a Chinese-style dragon carried a Buddha wreathed in fire under which marched millions of Asians who destroyed all in their path, killing all whites. After his nightmare, which Wilhelm regarded as a message from God about the coming, apocalyptic great "race war" between Europe and Asia which would decide the future of the 20th century, he had a painting of his nightmare done by his court painter Hermann Knackfuss in September 1895. The painting, which was known as the Yellow Peril painting was very popular in its time. Ehrenfels saw the Yellow Peril painting in December 1895 and was greatly impressed. From 1895 onwards, Ehrenfels was greatly influenced by the "Yellow Peril" propaganda put out by the German government, in which Wilhelm repeatedly warned of the alleged Asian menace to the West. As a Wagnerite who deeply involved in the various Wagner societies in Vienna, Ehrenfels got to know Philipp, Prince of Eulenburg, the German ambassador to Austria-Hungary and an anti-Asian racist who promoted the fear of the "Yellow Peril" to anybody who would listen. In this viewpoint, to protect European civilization white men would have to wage a "primitive" and "primordial" racial war against the "Yellow Peril", which justified both white supremacy and male supremacy. The same sort of language and imagery was always frequently invoked with the fears about a "race war" with the blacks and the Jews. European racists often considered the Jews to be a race apart from the rest of humanity, and so the Jews were lumped in with the blacks and the Asians.

Ehrenfels believed that Asians were especially dangerous enemies of the Europeans because in East Asia, polygamy was accepted as a natural part of the social order. Ehrenfels warned that this process of "socially victorious" Chinese men taking as many wives as possible was ultimately a grave threat to the West. As a result of polygamy, genetically superior Asian men were fathering as many children as possible, with as many women as possible, while genetically superior European men were fathering children by only one woman. As a result of European monogamy and Asian polygamy, the Europeans were losing out to the Asians, and it was only a matter of time before this genetic edge allowed the Asians to destroy European civilization. As a social Darwinist and a philosopher thereof, Ehrenfels saw all history as an endless racial struggle with the fittest "races" surviving. Ehrenfels took it for granted that the whites and Asians were natural enemies, and always would be. In Ehrenfels's viewpoint, the fact that Chinese were capable of working hard while eating less than Europeans were an important sign that the Asian "race" was, thanks to polygamy, starting become the stronger and "tougher race". Ehrenfels wrote with alarm that: "the average constitutional strength of the Chinese, their resistance to overwork and...noxious and prejudicial influences of all kinds...exceeds that of the civilized peoples of the West to an astonishing degree". Ehrenfels warned that it this progress was allowed to continue, then the "beautiful Aryan race" to whom Ehrenfels compared to "clear mountain streams" and "purest white milk" would be swept away by the Asian "torrents of mud". Ehrenfels stated that racist anti-Asian immigrant laws like the Chinese Exclusion Act in the United States were a good first step, but were insufficient to stop the rise of the "tough, fecund Mongol race".

=== Ehrenfels's "solution" ===
Ehrenfels proposed solution was to do away with monogamy, and create a new social order based on polygamy. To begin with, the state would take complete control of human sexuality. In Ehrenfels's new society, the "highest goal" would the "improvement of the human constitution" by allowing only the fittest white men to breed. In Ehrenfels's new society, only those white men who proved themselves to be social "winners" would be allowed to marry, and the number of wives a man could have would be based upon his degree of success. The more successful the man, the more wives he would have. The state would assign a man his wives after determining his social success and other features such as health, looks, morality and intelligence. Woman by contrast would be allowed only one husband at a time. All women would be forced to live in communal barracks at the expense of the state, where they would help other each raise their children and where their husbands would visit for sex. In this proposed new society, romantic love would be done away with, and relations between men and women would be only sexual. Ehrenfels maintained in his new society that henceforward only the "specifically sexual element" in relations between the sexes would matter and other "motives alien to breeding" like romantic love would done away with in order to improve the white race. Ehrenfels argued that what men and women both really wanted were those "days and nights of great and insatiable longing and desire", so in this new society with no "trivialities" like romantic love to interference with the business of sex would be a great improvement for both sexes.

For men who were "social losers", a certain number of the genetically less fit women would be sterilized and turned into the "courtesan class" who would be set aside for the sexual use of the "loser" men in brothels. Since in Ehrenfels's viewpoint, all that men really wanted from women was sex, not love, in this new society men would not suffer the psychological problems caused by monogamy, thus ending the "splitting". Since this new society would be meritocratic, this would solve the entire "Social Question" as there would no more inherited wealth and privilege. Furthermore, in this new society, women living in their communal barracks would help each other with raising children, so women would have more time for leisure, and as such Ehrenfels believed that women would come to see this new society as a huge improvement over the previous monogamist society. Their husbands now free of monogamy would treat them better, and so the entire "Women's Question" would dissolve as women would lose interest in feminism (which Enrenfels saw as very unnatural). To end the "Yellow Peril" once and for all, Ehrenfels suggested that the "white nations" band together to conquer all the Asian nations before it was too late, and create a new world racial order with a hereditary, racially determined "caste system". In Ehrenfels's vision, whites would serve as the oligarchic "Aryan" military and intellectual castes and the Asians and blacks as the slave castes supporting the whites. Ehrenfels in essays published in 1903 and 1904 that in this industrial age, where the majority of humanity was doomed to spend their lives in "mindless, indeed mind-numbing mechanical labor", that this sort of work was best done by "regressive types" of people instead of "human types of higher value". Ehrenfels argued that Asians and blacks were the "regressive types" born for lives of mindless labor while whites were the types of "higher value" meant for creative thinking, so the division of labor he proposed for his caste system was the one that best suited the intellectual capabilities of the different races that would create the "proper relationship" between them. To prevent miscegenation, interracial sex would be a capital crime with offenders to be publicly hanged. The American historian Richard Weikart wrote Ehrenfels was typical of the "progress through racial extermination" school of thought that characterized much of the academia in the German-speaking world in the first part of the 20th century, writing that: "Through Ehrenfels was not explicit on this point, presumably the elevation of the Europeans he desired would lead to the annihilation of the East Asians, as well as the other races, whom Ehrenfels considered far inferior to the Europeans.

Until the Russian-Japanese War of 1904-05, Ehrenfels believed that these sorts of radical changes would only happen sometime in the far-future, or as Ehrenfels put it in 1902: "the Aryan will only respond to the imperative of sexual reform when the waves of the Mongolian tide are lapping around his neck". After Japan's victory over Russia in 1905, Ehrenfels wrote "the absolute necessity of a radical sexual reform for the continued existence of the western races of men has... been raised from the level of discussion to the level of a scientifically proven fact". In a 1907 essay, Ehrenfels wrote that radical sexual reform was "now a question of 'to be or not to be'...We have no time to lose." Ehrenfels suggested as a starting point, the Austrian government begin to allow soldiers upon completing their military service to have polygamous marriages, with those soldiers who had proven themselves especially intelligent, brave and physically fit to have the largest number of wives. Subsequently, Ehrenfels made a public appeal to "manly Aryan men" who had proved themselves to be both "social winners" and "studs" to disregard monogamy and marriage, and to start impregnating as many women as possible to give the "white race" a genetic edge in the coming war against the "Yellow Peril". Before the Russian-Japanese war, it has been the Chinese who had personified the Asian threat to Ehrenfels; after the war, the Asian enemy of the future was the Japanese. In his essays in 1907–1908, Ehrenfels wrote that the Chinese lacked "all potentialities...determination, initiative, productivity, invention and organizational talent". While the Chinese were now a listless mass of allegedly mindless Asians, Ehrenfels wrote that Japan was "a first-rate military power", and should the Japanese conquer the Chinese, the Japanese would engage in selective breeding to create a race of "healthy, sly, cunning coolies, virtuosos of reproduction" in China. Once that happened, Ehrenfels warned that a vast Sino-Japanese army would set to conquer the world consisting of genetically superior soldiers whom the Western powers would be unable to stop.

=== Public acceptance ===
Ehrenfels's ideas were not widely accepted by the public, but the very fact that he was allowed to publish essays on his new society in intellectually prestigious, learned academic journals in Germany and Austria shows that his ideas were part of the intellectual mainstream in the first years of the 20th century. Both Alfred Ploetz of Archiv für Rassen-und Gesellschaftbiologie, the journal for the widely respected Society for Race Hygiene, and Max Marcuse of the sexologist journal Sexual-Probleme, endorsed Ehrenfels's plans for a new society. Social Darwinism and racism were part of the intellectual mainstream in the West, as was the widespread belief that white men were starting to become "soft", and if white men continued to lose their masculine "hardness" inevitably this would lead to process of "racial degeneration", which would end with the whites becoming enslaved to the "Yellow Peril". The early 20th century saw what the historian Jonathan Katz called the "invention of heterosexuality", by which he meant that the ideal of romantic "true love" was discarded in popular discourse for the first time by a new discourse that celebrated sexuality and carnal pleasure as the objectives of relationships. Ehrnefels's opposition to romantic love and his unabashed celebration of sexual pleasure as part of the evolutionary duties of racial improvement fitted in well to the new age. Katz noted that those who saw sexual desires as the core of relationships between men and women almost always justified this with reference to human "need", "drive" or "instinct" to pass on their genes.

=== Opposition ===
However, Ehrenfels's ideas did meet with disagreement. In December 1908, Sigmund Freud invited Ehrenfels to give a lecture on his proposed new society. The audience generally offered polite dissent from Ehrenfels with one participant calling his new society an "adolescent sexual fantasy". Ehrenfels's proposed new society earned him criticism from the Catholic Church which objected to his attacks on Christian monogamy; from feminists who were offended by his idea that women should be kept essentially as chattels and treated as sex objects by men; and from the romantics everywhere who were upset about his plans to abolish romantic love. The German feminist Helene Stöcker protested against Ehrenfels's plans, albeit from the same social Darwinian viewpoint, writing: "A sexual ethic that does not rest on the development of women as a personality, but instead regards her merely as an object of male lust, is absolutely counter-evolutionary".

The American historian Edward Ross Dickinson wrote the "pieces" of Ehrenfels's thinking were all mainstream, but the way he brought them together was "idiosyncratic". Dickinson suggested that these ideas were rooted in Ehrenfels's own tormented sexuality as he was both fascinated/repulsed by sex. Ehrenfels had been brought up in an extremely conservative, sexually repressive Roman Catholic family, and from his teenage years onwards, always felt deep shame and guilt about his sexual desires. Despite his obsession with sex, Ehrenfels was enraged by pornography (which he wanted to see ruthlessly stamped out) and by the "indecent" popular culture of Vienna, which he saw as far too sexualized. Ehrenfels was especially offended by the Animierkneipen ("hostess bar"), a type of popular bar in Austria where the buxom waitresses wore very low-cut dresses and were encouraged to flirt with the male customers in order to get them to buy more drinks; in the Animierkneipen, the waitresses were paid commissions based on their nightly sales of alcohol. Ehrenfels was deeply disgusted by the sight of what he considered to be women flaunting their sexuality to manipulate men, and wanted the Animierkneipen banned. Besides that, Ehrenfels complained constantly about "indecent puns" used by ordinary people, the "courtesan style" in modern fashion and by the "pornography of the humorous weeklies, in comic songs, farces and operettas".

Dickinson wrote that when Ehrenfels wrote about men suffering from what he called the "tortuously shackled animal personality" created by monogamy, he was almost certainly writing about himself. Dickinson suggested that based upon a reading of Ehrenfels's private letters his concerns about psychological "splitting" within men were based upon his own visits to prostitutes, where he saw johns abusing the prostitutes, and that he may himself have badly treated the prostitutes he had sex with (his letters are somewhat ambiguous on this point). The frequency with which Ehrenfels brought up the example of how psychological "splitting" was causing men to abuse prostitutes may very well have reflected a guilty conscience on his part about past abuse that he had inflicted on the prostitutes whose services he had used. In a 1908 essay entitled "The Yellow Peril", Ehrenfels wrote that 13 years earlier in 1895, he "arrived, on the basis of personal experience, which it would be superfluous to recount here, at the following two alternatives: 'Either I am an individual of totally corrupt sex instincts, or our monogamous sexual order is an institution with completely corrupting tendencies.'"

=== "Flight from domesticity" novels ===
In the late 19th century, what the British historian John Tosh called the "flight from domesticity" novels became very popular, which were a major influence on Ehrenfels. The "flight from domesticity" novels typically dealt with a ruggedly tough male who lived life on his own terms, usually alone and always in some remote frontier place, and who almost never had a relationship with a woman or children. The heroes in the "flight from domesticity" novels were usually a frontiersman, a hunter, a cowboy, a scout or some other suitably adventuresome, manly occupation. Because the heroes in the "flight from domesticity" novels lived in the wild in harmony with nature, they were always portrayed as being more morally pure and authentic than the people who lived in modern civilization. The hero in the "flight from domesticity" novels was always the strong silent type, the taciturn tough guy who lived uncompromisingly by his own code of honor and who embodied typical male values like courage and self-reliance far better than did the men who lived in civilization. Typical of the "flight from domesticity" novels were the Allan Quatermain novels by the British novelist H. Rider Haggard dealing with the adventures of a British frontiersman in 19th century South Africa; the Western novels by the German novelist Karl May dealing with the adventures of the German immigrant cowboy Old Shatterhand and his Apache best friend Winnetou in the American Old West; the Scott Allen Cameron novels by the Canadian novelist Ralph Connor about a Mountie singly-handedly upholding the law in the Rocky Mountains; and Western adventure novels by the Irish-American novelist Thomas Mayne Reid. The typical hero in Reid's novels which were extremely popular in the United States and Europe was described as being: "gallant, skillful at arms, far more at ease around men than around women, has lots of time for trappers and soldiers but little for the upper classes and intellectuals, and is much happier hunting and killing than thinking."

Tosh argued by the end of the 19th century, the burdens of being a husband and a father in a modern, industrialized, urban society were such that many men fantasized about "chucking it all" to escape domesticity; to live a life unburdened by the demands of a job, children, a wife or any other social obligation. Hence the popularity of the "flight from domesticity" novels, which celebrated the "masculine primitive". Ehrenfels's ideas about his new society where men would live apart from women and children, would not participate in raising their children and whose relationships with their wives would be entirely sexual bear a very strong resemblance to the themes in the "flight from domesticity" novels. Significantly, Ehrenfels believed that in his new society where men would not be burdened by the demands of family life would allow them to live more full and adventuresome lives like the type depicted in the "flight from domesticity" books. Ehrenfels's own fantasies about manly Aryan heroes battling the "Yellow Peril" who would single-handedly kill hundreds of the "evil" Asians while sleeping with every white women in sight, but never having a relationship or raising children appeared to be a sexualized version of the macho fantasies found in the "flight from domesticity" novels. Not all of the "flight from domesticity" writers took the same racist line as did as Ehrenfels, with May in particular being very sympathetic towards the plight of Native-Americans in his Old Shatterhand novels. In many of the "flight from domesticity" books, non-white peoples like the Zulus and the Apache were depicted admiringly if rather patronizingly as "noble savages" who in their primitive state had preserved certain spiritual qualities that people in the industrialized West had long since lost. What Ehrenfels like many other men at the time seemed to have liked in the "flight from domesticity" novels was the celebration of the "masculine primitive"; a purer, rawer, tougher form of masculinity that was alleged to exist more in the wild than that found in civilization.

=== Dickinson's critique ===
Dickinson noted that for Ehrenfels, the fear of the "Yellow Peril" was always expressed in water imagery, noting how Ehrenfels warned of a "flood" of Chinese coming to the West, that the Chinese were a "torrent of mud" in which Europe was drowning in, that the Japanese were a "polluting liquid", and that Europeans would not respond to this menace until the "waves" of Asians were up to their neck. The German historian Klaus Theweleit wrote that the same threatening water imagery was frequently used in the writings of Freikorps men during the interwar period, but the only threats were the Jews and the Communists (usually the same thing in these writings), while the Asians which threatened to subsume German men. Theweleit wrote that right-wing German men who had served in the Freikorps during the interwar period were obsessed with proving their masculinity by establishing their "hardness", and that the water imagery reflected their fear of women, the erotic, love, intimacy, and of dependence, all things that threatened to make them less than manly. Theweleit argued in his 1977 book Männerphantasien (Male Fantasies) that the water imagery was associated with sexuality and a loss of self-control. Reviewing Theweleit's book in 1987, the American historian Paul Robinson wrote that "...one can't read it without feeling that Mr. Theweleit is onto something: the piling up of examples eventually begins to take its toll on even the most skeptical." Dickinson argued that men like Ehrenfels felt the same sexual anxieties about their masculinity as did the writers examined by Theweleit, but he just projected these anxieties onto the "Yellow Peril" rather than "Judeo-Bolshevism". To be in love can often mean a certain loss of self-control as those in love often invoke the images of being "swept away" or "swallowed up". Dickinson argued that for Ehrenfels, a self-proclaimed macho "manly man" and Aryan alpha male, the prospect of being in love with someone was terrifying as it meant the possibility of losing control, and he projected those fears-which were always expressed in the water imagery-onto the Asians. Ehrenfels often denied quite vehemently that marriage had anything to do with love, writing about his own marriage that marriage was: "in the final analysis the sexual provision for two persons of the opposite sex through mutual, exclusive and contractual agreement to intercourse. Our morality tries to cover the matter...instead of sexual provision we speak of a unity of souls and the contractual agreement to coitus...is more or less transparently veiled by the term 'community of bed and table'". Dickson wrote that Ehrenfels's efforts to deny that a man could ever love a woman suggested a huge fear of emotional dependence on his part.

Dickinson noted Ehrenfels's vision of humanity was a simplistic one, in which men fought and struggled to pass on their genes by impregnating as many women as possible. The existence of homosexuality and bisexuality posed a major problem for Ehrenfels's view of humanity. In 1897, the Scientific-Humanitarian Committee, the first gay rights group in not only Germany, but also the world was founded. One of the founders of the Scientific-Humanitarian Committee, Magnus Hirschfeld, the German sexologist and gay rights advocate, was a well known figure in the German-speaking world in the early 20th century and his theories were much debated. In 1899, Hirschfeld had argued in an essay: "that in all mental and physical characteristics there are only gradual, quantitative differences between men and women, that between them, in every respect, there are all sorts of mixed forms in extraordinary diversity". Hirschfeld's theories about varieties of human sexuality ranging from heterosexual to bisexual to homosexual and all of which were equally valid, posed a major for Ehrenfels. Ehrenfels simply dismissed everything Hirschfeld had to say out of hand, saying that homosexuality was a case of moral degeneration caused by a few "biologically degenerate homosexuals" who seduced otherwise "healthy boys" into their lifestyle. Ehrenfels could not accept Hirschfeld's theory that some people were born gay as it contradicted his view of male sexuality as an aggressive drive to pass on one's genes too much.

Dickinson noted that Ehrenfels's intense bouts of depression together with periods of manic activity suggested a degree of emotional instability on his part, adding:

"A number of prominent men of the period more or less conform to the same pattern. Gail Bederman has described related personality structures in G. Stanley Hall and Theodore Roosevelt. Both exhibited manic restlessness, quasi-messianic self-regard, insecure masculine sexuality, a fear of racial degeneration and bizarre theories regarding the regenerating evolutionary power of masculine sexuality and the genocidal instincts of all males-who, each believed, naturally sought to exterminate men of other races as part of the struggle for the survival of the fittest. Emperor Wilhelm II of Germany, while probably closer to outright mental illness, exhibited similar traits-including manic activity, intellectual eclecticism, megalomania, occasional nervous breakdowns, genocidal cogitations, and concern with the 'Yellow Peril'."

Dickinson also argued that Ehrenfels's constant use of this sort of sexualized language of power, aggression and domination when writing about China reflected his own fear of sex, love, sexual dependence, his sexual adequacy as a man, and most of all, emotional dependence. Dickinson further noted the great irony of Ehrenfels's life, namely that his own biography disapproved his theories about men as sex-crazed animals incapable of love for either the women in their lives or their children. By all accounts, Ehrenfels did indeed deeply love his wife and his two children.

Dickinson noted that many of Ehrenfels's ideas seem to anticipate National Socialism. Within the first decade of the 20th century some of the more radical members of the eugenicist and social Darwinist movement in Germany were already advocating killing the physically and/or mentally disabled as the best way of improving the Aryan race. Ehrenfels made it clear that in his proposed new society, the mentally and physically disabled would be prevented from marrying, but stopped short of explicitly advocating their murder. Likewise, Dickinson claims that Ehrenfels was opposed to antisemitism, writing there was no "Jewish bogey" threatening the "Aryan race", called antisemitism "silly" and argued that the Jews would be very useful allies for the Aryans in the coming war with the Asians.

== Baroness Emma von Ehrenfels ==
Ehrenfels's wife Emma was befriended by Houston Stewart Chamberlain. His daughter was the author Imma von Bodmershof and his son Rolf, a professor of anthropology who converted to Islam in 1927 and assumed the name Omar. Omar Rolf's wife, Elfriede von Bodmershof, was a literary person. As well, she registered the pseudonym "Kurban Said" as belonging to her for the novels "Ali and Nino" as well as "Girl from the Golden Horn." However, Lucy Tal whose company E.P. Tal had published "Ali and Nino" wrote her lawyer saying, "I had never heard of the Baroness... Also my late husband's right hand and secretary knew nothing of the Baroness. Only much later, when for some reason, we looked at Buchhaendler Boersenblatt, we discovered the Baroness as Kurban Said. Of course, under the Nazis pseudonyms were born, people unrightful had themselves as authors ..."

In the 1890s, Ehrenfels-who was a passionate fan of Richard Wagner-befriended a fellow Wagnerite, the British born German völkisch thinker Houston Stewart Chamberlain, "the Evangelist of Race". Ehrenfels, who despite being a Wagnerite and a friend of Chamberlain's did not generally associate himself with the more extreme racist and anti-Semitic wing of the Wagner movement that Chamberlain came to be the leader of. Ehrenfels never accepted Chamberlain's anti-Semitism, but he was influenced by Chamberlain's theory that the Aryan race was the greatest and best race of them all. Chamberlain was later to have an affair with Ehrenfels's wife, Baroness Emma von Ehrenfels.

== Felix Weltsch ==
The Czech Zionist philosopher and friend of Kafka Felix Weltsch wrote many essays and memos about Ehrenfels, who himself was of partly Jewish descent. Weltsch was one of Ehrenfels's most important pupils.

== Works ==
- 1876 - Hadmar von Kuering (Bourgeois tragedy)
- 1876 - Brutus (Bourgeois tragedy)
- 1876 - Richard Löwenherz (Bourgeois tragedy)
- 1885 - Die Brüder von Hartenstein (Drama) -, Graz 1885
- 1890 - Der Kampf des Prometheus (Libretto)
- 1886 - Metaphysische Ausführungen im Anschlusse an Emil du Bois-Reymond
- 1888 - Über Fühlen und Wollen: Eine psychologische Studie. Carl Gerold & Sohn, Wien 1888
- 1890 - "Über Gestaltqualitäten". In: Vierteljahrsschrift für wissenschaftliche Philosophie 14 (1890), (Page 249–292) (English: "On the Qualities of Form", 1890)
- 1893 - "Werttheorie und Ethik". In: Vierteljahrsschrift für wissenschaftliche Philosophie 17 (1893), (Page 26–110, 200–266, 321–363, 413–425)
- 1894 - "Werttheorie und Ethik". In: Vierteljahrsschrift für wissenschaftliche Philosophie, 18 (1894), (Page 22–97)
- 1897 - System der Werttheorie. O. Reisland, Leipzig 1898, (2 volumes)
- 1904 - "Sexuales, Ober- und Unterbewusstsein". In: Politisch-Anthropologische Revue 2 (1903-4), (Page 456–476)
- 1904 - "Die sexuale Reform". In: Politisch-Anthropologische Revue 2 (1903–1904) (Page 970–994)
- 1907 - Sexualethik. J. F. Bergmann, Wiesbaden 1907
- 1911 - "Leitziele zur Rassenbewertung". In: Archiv für Rassen- und Gesellschaftsbiologie 8 (1911), (Page 59–71)
- 1913 - Richard Wagner und seine Apostaten. Ein Beitrag zur Jahrhundertfeier. H. Heller Wien & Leipzig 1913
- 1916 - Kosmogonie, Diederichs, Jena 1916
- 1922 - Das Primzahlengesetz, entwickelt und dargestellt auf Grund der Gestalttheorie. Reisland, Leipzig 1922
- 1930 - "Sexualmoral der Zukunft". In: Archiv für Rassen- und Gesellschaftsbiologie, 22 (1930), (Page 292–304)

== Sources ==
- Dickinson, Edward Ross (May 2002). "Sex, Masculinity, and the "Yellow Peril": Christian von Ehrenfels' Program for a Revision of the European Sexual Order, 1902-1910". German Studies Review. 25 (2): 255–284. doi:10.2307/1432992. ISSN 0149-7952. JSTOR 1432992. PMID 20373550.
- Field, Geoffrey (1981). The Evangelist of Race: The Germanic Vision of Houston Stewart Chamberlain (1st ed.). New York: Columbia University Press. ISBN 978-0231048606.
- Palmer, James (7 June 2011). The Bloody White Baron (June 2011 reprint ed.). New York: Basic Books. ISBN 978-0465022076.
- Röhl, John (1996). The Kaiser and his Court: Wilhelm II and the Government of Germany. Cambridge University Press. ISBN 9780521565042.
- Taylor, Ann (February 1988). "German Radical Feminism and Eugenics, 1900-1908". German Studies Review. 11 (1): 31–56. doi:10.2307/1430833. ISSN 0149-7952. JSTOR 1430833.
- Weikart, Richard (May 2003). "Progress through Racial Extermination: Social Darwinism, Eugenics, and Pacifism in Germany, 1860-1918". German Studies Review. 26 (2): 273–294. doi:10.2307/1433326. ISSN 0149-7952. JSTOR 1433326.
