= Ernst Mally =

Austrian philosopher (1879–1944)

- Born: 11 October 1879; Kranj, Duchy of Carniola, Austria-Hungary
- Died: 8 March 1944 (aged 64); Schwanberg, Austria
- Political party: GDVP; Nazi Party

Education
- Education: University of Graz (PhD, 1903; Dr. phil. hab., 1912/13)
- Theses: Untersuchungen zur Gegenstandstheorie des Messens (Investigations in the Object Theory of Measurement) (1903); Gegenstandstheoretische Grundlagen der Logik und Logistik (Object-theoretic Foundations for Logics and Logistics (1912)
- Doctoral advisor: Alexius Meinong

Philosophical work
- Era: 20th-century philosophy
- Region: Western philosophy
- School: Austrian realist Graz school of object theory (early); Analytic philosophy (after 1912)
- Institutions: University of Graz (1925–1942)
- Doctoral students: J. N. Findlay
- Main interests: Metaphysics, theory of objects
- Notable ideas: "Instantiating" vs. "being determined by" (erfüllen vs. determiniert sein) a property as two modes of predication Nuclear vs. extranuclear (formal vs. extra-formal) properties (formale vs. außerformale Bestimmungen) of objects Abstract determinates (Determinaten) as the content of mental states Axiomatization of ethics (deontic logic)

Ernst Mally (/ˈmɑːli/; German: [ˈmali]; 11 October 1879 – 8 March 1944) was an Austrian analytic philosopher, initially affiliated with Alexius Meinong's Graz school of object theory. Mally was one of the founders of deontic logic and is mainly known for his contributions in that field of research. In metaphysics, he is known for introducing a distinction between two kinds of predication, better known as the dual predication approach.

== Life ==
Mally was born in the town of Kranj (German: Krainburg) in the Duchy of Carniola, Austria-Hungary (now in Slovenia). His father was of Slovene origin, but identified himself with Austrian German culture (he also Germanized the orthography of his surname, originally spelled Mali, a common Slovene surname of Upper Carniola). After his death, the family moved to the Carniolan capital of Ljubljana (German: Laibach). There, Ernst attended the prestigious Ljubljana German-language Gymnasium. Already at a young age, Mally became a fervent supporter of the pan-German nationalist movement of Georg von Schönerer. In the same time, he developed an interest in philosophy.

In 1898, he enrolled in the University of Graz, where he studied philosophy under the supervision of Alexius Meinong, as well as physics and mathematics, specializing in formal logic. He received his doctorate in 1903 under the supervision of Meinong with the dissertation Untersuchungen zur Gegenstandstheorie des Messens (Investigations in the Object Theory of Measurement; published as a book in 1904). In 1906 he started teaching at a high school in Graz, at the same time collaborating with Adalbert Meingast and working as Meinong's assistant at the university. He also maintained close contacts with the Graz Psychological Institute, founded by Meinong. In 1912, he published his habilitation thesis entitled Gegenstandstheoretische Grundlagen der Logik und Logistik (Object-theoretic Foundations for Logics and Logistics) at Graz (with Meinong as supervisor) and earned his habilitation in 1913.

From 1915 to 1918 he served as an officer in the Austro-Hungarian Army. After the end of World War I, Mally joined the Greater German People's Party (GDVP), which called the unification of German Austria with Germany. In the same period, he started teaching at the university and in 1925 he took over Meinong's chair. In 1938, he became a member of the National Socialist Teachers League and two months after the Anschluss he joined the Nazi Party. He continued teaching during the Nazi administration of Austria until 1942 when he retired.

He died in 1944 in Schwanberg.

== Philosophical work ==
=== Mally's deontic logic ===
Mally was the first logician ever to attempt an axiomatization of ethics (Mally 1926). He used five axioms, which are given below. They form a first-order theory that quantifies over propositions, and there are several predicates to understand first. !x means that x ought to be the case. Ux means that x is unconditionally obligatory, i.e. that !x is necessarily true. ∩x means that x is unconditionally forbidden, i.e. U(¬x). A f B is the binary relation A requires B, i.e. A materially implies !B. (All entailment in the axioms is material conditional.) It is defined by axiom III, whereas all other terms are defined as a preliminary.

$\begin{array}{rl} \mbox{I.} & ((A\; \operatorname{f}\; B) \And (B \to C)) \to (A\; \operatorname{f}\; C) \\ \mbox{II.} & ((A\; \operatorname{f}\; B) \And (A\;\operatorname{f}\;C)) \to (A\; \operatorname{f}\; (B \And C)) \\ \mbox{III.} & (A\; \operatorname{f}\; B) \leftrightarrow\; !(A \to B) \\ \mbox{IV.} & \exists U\; !U \\ \mbox{V.} & \neg (U\; \operatorname{f}\; \cap) \end{array}$

Note the implied universal quantifiers in the above axioms.

The fourth axiom has confused some logicians because its formulation is not as they would have expected, since Mally gave each axiom a description in words also, and he said that axiom IV meant "the unconditionally obligatory is obligatory", i.e. (as many logicians have insisted) UA → !A. Meanwhile, axiom 5 lacks an object to which the predicates apply, a typo. However, it turns out these are the least of Mally's worries (see below).

=== Failure of Mally's deontic logic ===
Theorem: This axiomatization of deontic logic implies that !x if and only if x is true, OR !x is unsatisfiable. (This makes it useless to deontic logicians.)

Proof: Using axiom III, axiom I may be rewritten as (!(A → B) & (B → C)) → !(A → C). Since B → C holds whenever C holds, one immediate consequence is that (!(A → B) → (C → !(A → C))). In other words, if A requires B, it requires any true statement. In the special case where A is a tautology, the theorem has consequence (!B → (C → !C)). Thus, if at least one statement ought be true, every statement must materially entail it ought be true, and so every true statement ought be true. As for the converse (i.e. if some statement ought be true then all statements that ought be true are true), consider the following logic: ((U → !A) & (A → ∩)) → (U → !∩) is a special case of axiom I, but its consequent contradicts axiom V, and so ¬((U → !A) & (A → ∩)). The result !A → A can be shown to follow from this, since !A implies that U → !A and ¬A implies that A → ∩; and, since these are not both true, we know that !A → A.

Mally thought that axiom I was self-evident, but he likely confused it with an alternative in which the implication B → C is logical, which would indeed make the axiom self-evident. The theorem above, however, would then not be demonstrable. The theorem was proven by Karl Menger, the next deontic logician. Neither Mally's original axioms nor a modification that avoids this result remains popular today. Menger did not suggest his own axioms.

=== Metaphysics ===
In metaphysics, Mally is known for introducing a distinction between two kinds of predication, a strategy better known as the dual predication approach, for solving the problem of nonexistent objects (Mally 1912). He also introduced a similar strategy, the dual property strategy, but did not endorse it. The dual property strategy was eventually adopted by Meinong.

Mally developed a realistic approach to ontology (Mally 1935) and saw himself in opposition to the Vienna Circle and the logical positivists.

=== Legacy ===
Mally's metaphysical work influences some contemporary metaphysicians and logicians working in abstract object theory, especially Edward Zalta.

The analytic philosopher David Kellogg Lewis argued forcefully that the name of the fictional Australian poet Ern Malley, created by James McAuley and Harold Stewart, was an allusion to Mally.

== Works ==
- (1904 [1903]) Untersuchungen zur Gegenstandstheorie des Messens (Investigations in the Object Theory of Measurement), Leipzig: Barth (doctoral thesis).
- (1912) Gegenstandstheoretische Grundlagen der Logik und Logistik (Object-theoretic Foundations for Logics and Logistics), Leipzig: Barth (habilitation thesis).
- (1912) Die grundlegenden Beziehungen und Verknüpfungen der Gegenstände, Progr. Graz.
- (1926) Grundgesetze des Sollens. Elemente der Logik des Willens (The Basic Laws of Ought: Elements of the Logic of Willing), Graz: Leuschner & Lubensky. Reprinted in Ernst Mally: Logische Schriften. Großes Logikfragment—Grundgesetze des Sollens, K. Wolf, P. Weingartner (eds.), Dordrecht: Reidel, 1971, 227–324.
- (1935) Erlebnis und Wirklichkeit. Einleitung zur Philosophie der Natürlichen Weltauffassung (Experience and Reality: Introduction to the Philosophy of the Natural World-conception), Leipzig: Julius Klinkhardt.
