= Object theory =

Object theory can refer to

- The object of a metatheory.
- The branch of metaphysics also known as abstract object theory.
