= Otto Weininger =

Austrian philosopher (1880–1903)

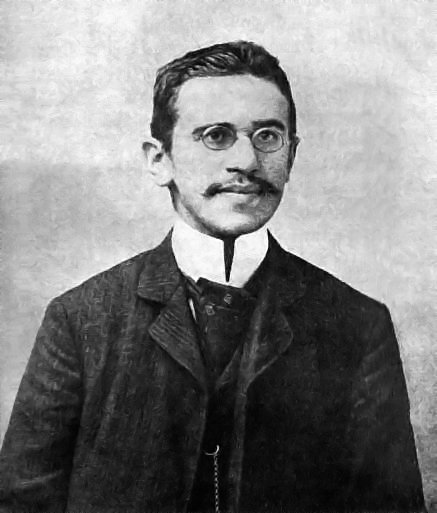
- Born: 3 April 1880; Vienna, Austria-Hungary
- Died: 4 October 1903 (aged 23); Vienna, Austria-Hungary
- Cause of death: Suicide by gunshot

Education
- Education: University of Vienna (PhD, 1902)

Philosophical work
- Era: 20th-century philosophy
- Region: Western philosophy
- School: Moral idealism Kantian ethics
- Main interests: Philosophy, logic, psychology, ethics, gender, philosophy of religion, genius
- Notable ideas: The coexistence of femininity and masculinity in all people The unity of logic and ethics Logic's connection to the principle of identity (A=A)

Otto Weininger (German: [ˈvaɪnɪŋɐ]; 3 April 1880 – 4 October 1903) was an Austrian philosopher who in 1903 published the book Geschlecht und Charakter (Sex and Character), which gained popularity after his suicide at the age of 23. Weininger had a strong influence on Ludwig Wittgenstein, August Strindberg, and, via his lesser-known work Über die letzten Dinge, on James Joyce.

== Life ==
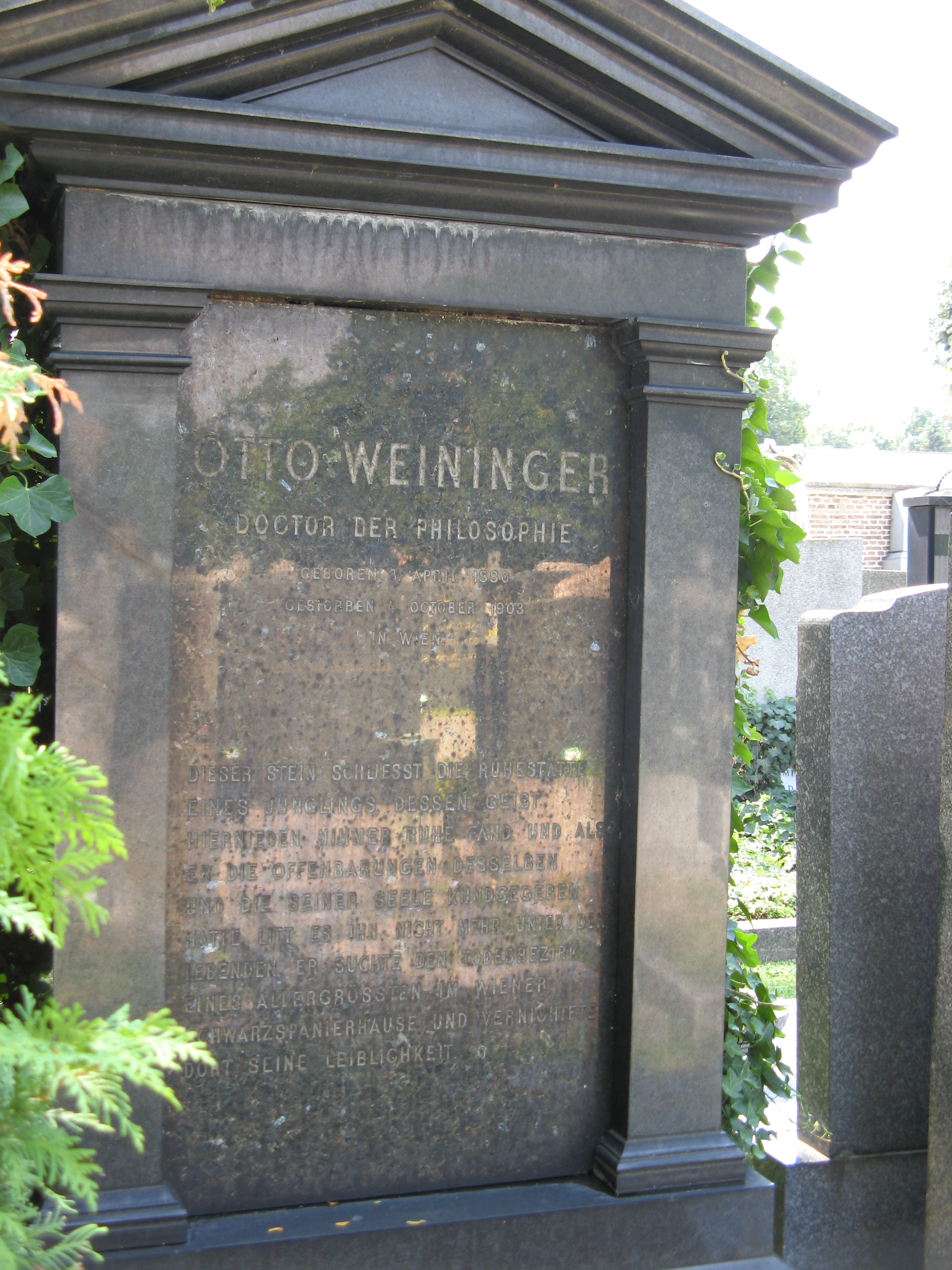
Weininger's grave

Otto Weininger was born on 3 April 1880 in Vienna, a son of the Jewish goldsmith Leopold Weininger and his wife Adelheid. After attending primary school and graduating from secondary school in July 1898, Weininger registered at the University of Vienna in October of the same year. He studied philosophy and psychology but took courses in natural sciences and medicine as well. Weininger learned Greek, Latin, French and English very early, later also Spanish and Italian, and acquired passive knowledge of Swedish, Danish and Norwegian. While he was at the university, he would attend the Philosophical Society, where he heard, among others, Richard Wagner's son-in-law Houston Stewart Chamberlain, who was regarded as an outsider but an original thinker.

In the autumn of 1901, Weininger tried to find a publisher for his work Eros and the Psyche: A biological-psychological study, which he submitted to his professors Friedrich Jodl and Laurenz Müllner as his thesis in 1902. He met Sigmund Freud, who did not, however, recommend the text to a publisher. His professors accepted the thesis and Weininger received his Ph.D. degree in July 1902. Shortly thereafter he became a Protestant.

In 1902 Weininger went to Bayreuth, where he witnessed a performance of Richard Wagner's Parsifal, which impressed him deeply. Via Dresden and Copenhagen he made his way to Christiania (Oslo), where he saw for the first time Henrik Ibsen's Peer Gynt on stage. Upon his return to Vienna, Weininger suffered from fits of deep depression. The decision to take his own life gradually took shape; after a long discussion with his friend Artur Gerber, however, Weininger realized that "it is not yet time".

In June 1903, after months of concentrated work, his book Sex and Character: A Fundamental Investigation – an attempt "to place sex relations in a new and decisive light" – was published by the Vienna publishers Braumüller & Co. The book contained his thesis to which three vital chapters were added: (XII) "The Nature of Woman and her Relation to the Universe", (XIII) "Judaism", (XIV) "Women and Humanity".

Although the book's reception was not negative, it did not create the expected stir. Weininger was attacked by Paul Julius Möbius, professor in Leipzig and author of the book On the Physiological Deficiency of Women and was accused of plagiarizing. Deeply disappointed and seemingly depressed, Weininger left for Italy.

Back in Vienna, he spent his last five days with his parents. On 3 October, he took a room in the house at Schwarzspanierstraße 15, where Ludwig van Beethoven had died. He told the landlady that he was not to be disturbed before morning, since he planned to work and then to go to bed late. That night he wrote two letters, one to his father and the other to his brother Richard, telling them that he was going to shoot himself.

On 4 October, Weininger was found mortally wounded, having shot himself in the chest. He died in the Wiener Allgemeines Krankenhaus (Vienna General Hospital) and was buried in the Matzleinsdorf Protestant Cemetery in Vienna.

== Sex and Character: A Fundamental Investigation ==
=== Masculinity and femininity ===
Sex and Character argues that all people are composed of a mixture of male and female substance, and attempts to support this view scientifically. The male aspect is active, productive, conscious and moral/logical, while the female aspect is passive, unproductive, unconscious and amoral/alogical. Weininger argues that emancipation is only possible for the "masculine woman", for example some lesbians, and that the female life is consumed with the sexual function, both with the act, as a prostitute, and the product, as a mother. The woman is a "matchmaker". By contrast, the duty of the male, or the masculine aspect of personality, is to strive to become a genius and to forgo sexuality for an abstract love of the absolute, God, which he finds within himself.

A significant part of his book is about the nature of genius. Weininger argues that genius never applies solely to a specific field such as mathematics or music, but there is only the universal genius, in whom everything exists and makes sense. He reasons that this quality is probably present in all people to some degree. Sex and Character became popular in Italy as an alternative to Freudian psychoanalysis due to the interest it generated among Italian intellectuals such as Steno Tedeschi, who translated the text to Italian.

=== Jewish versus Christian character ===
In a separate chapter, Weininger, himself a Jew who had converted to Christianity in 1902, analyzes the archetypal Jew as feminine, and thus profoundly irreligious, without true individuality (soul), and without a sense of good and evil. Christianity is described as "the highest expression of the highest faith", while Judaism is called "the extreme of cowardliness". Weininger decries the decay of modern times, and attributes much of it to feminine (or identically, "Jewish") character. By Weininger's reckoning everyone shows some femininity, and what he calls "Jewishness".

In the chapter titled "Judaism" in his book Sex and Character Weininger, who has himself often been considered a paragon of the "Self-hating Jew" stereotype, writes:

I must, however, make clear what I mean by Judaism; I mean neither a race nor a people nor a recognised creed. I think of it as a tendency of the mind, as a psychological constitution which is a possibility for all mankind, but which has become actual in the most conspicuous fashion only amongst the Jews. ... Thus the fact is explained that the bitterest Antisemites are to be found amongst the Jews themselves. (pp. 303–304)

Further:

The true conception of the State is foreign to the Jew, because he, like the woman, is wanting in personality; his failure to grasp the idea of true society is due to his lack of a free intelligible ego. Like women, Jews tend to adhere together, but they do not associate as free independent individuals mutually respecting each other's individuality. As there is no real dignity in women, so what is meant by the word "gentleman" does not exist amongst the Jews. The genuine Jew fails in this innate good breeding by which alone individuals honour their own individuality and respect that of others. There is no Jewish nobility, and this is the more surprising as Jewish pedigrees can be traced back for thousands of years. (pp. 307–308)

A subsequent paragraph continues:

The faults of the Jewish race have often been attributed to the repression of that race by Aryans, and many Christians are still disposed to blame themselves in this respect. But the self-reproach is not justified. Outward circumstances do not mould a race in one direction, unless there is in the race the innate tendency to respond to the moulding forces; the total result comes at least as much from a natural disposition as from the modifying circumstances. ...

The Jew is not really anti-moral. But, none the less, he does not represent the highest ethical type. He is rather non-moral, neither very good nor very bad. ... So also in the case of the woman. ... In the Jew and the woman, good and evil are not distinct from one another.

Jews, then, do not live as free, self-governing individuals, choosing between virtue and vice in the Aryan fashion. (pp. 308–309)

=== Critique of the Zeitgeist ===
On Jewishness, decadence and femininity:

Our age is not only the most Jewish, but also the most effeminate of all ages; an age in which art only provides a sudarium for its moods and which has derived the artistic urge in humans from the games played by animals; an age of the most credulous anarchism, an age without any appreciation of the state and law, an age of species ethics, an age of the shallowest of all imaginable interpretations of history (historical materialism); the age of capitalism, an age of capitalism and marxism, an age for which history, life, science, everything, has become nothing but economics and technology; an age that has declared genius to be a form of madness, but which no longer has one great artist or one great philosopher, an age that is most devoid of originality, but which chases most frantically after originality; an age that has replaced the idea of virginity with the cult of demivierge. This age has also the distinction of being the first to have not only affirmed and worshipped sexual intercourse, but to have practically made it a duty, not as a way of achieving oblivion, as the Romans or the Greeks did in their bacchanals, but in order to find itself and to give its own dreariness a meaning.

=== Translations into English ===
Sex and Character has been translated into English twice, in 1906 and in 2005; the two translations are listed below under "Sources". According to Allan Janik, the 1906 translation is "truly wretched," "bowdlerized," "truncated," and "distorted," "concealing considerably more than it revealed about Weininger." Janik adds that Ludwig Wittgenstein condemned it as "beastly". The 2005 translation, by contrast, Janik finds "exemplary."

== Reactions to suicide ==
Weininger's suicide in the house where Beethoven had died—the man he considered one of the greatest geniuses of all—made him a cause célèbre, inspired several imitation suicides, and generated interest in his book. The book received glowing reviews by Swedish author August Strindberg, who wrote that it had "probably solved the hardest of all problems", the "woman problem". (Note: In a letter from August Strindberg to Emil Schering.) The book furthermore attracted the attention of Russian philosopher Nikolai Berdyaev, who claimed that "after Nietzsche there was nothing already in this [contemporary German] fleeting culture so remarkable."

== Influence on Wittgenstein ==
Ludwig Wittgenstein read the book as a schoolboy and was deeply impressed by it, later listing it as one of his influences and recommending it to friends. Wittgenstein is recalled as saying that he thought Weininger was "a great genius". However, Wittgenstein's deep admiration of Weininger's thought was coupled with a fundamental disagreement with his position. Wittgenstein wrote to G. E. Moore, "It isn't necessary or rather not possible to agree with him but the greatness lies in that with which we disagree. It is his enormous mistake which is great." In the same letter to Moore, Wittgenstein added that if one were to add a negation sign before the whole of Sex and Character, one would have expressed an important truth.

== Weininger and the Nazis ==
Isolated parts of Weininger's writings were used by Nazi propaganda, despite the fact that Weininger actively argued against the ideas of race that came to be identified with the Nazis. In his private conversations, Hitler recalled a remark his mentor Dietrich Eckart made about Weininger: "I only knew one decent Jew and he committed suicide on the day when he realized that the Jew lives upon the decay of peoples ...".

In her book Nazi Ideology Prior to 1933, Barbara Miller Lane shows how Nazi ideologists such as Dietrich Eckart disregarded Weininger's deprecation of accusations against individual Jews, and instead simply stated that Jews, like women, lacked a soul and a belief in immortality, and that "Aryans" must guard themselves from "Jewishness" within, since this internal "Jewishness" is the source of evil. More generally, Weininger's views are considered an important step in attempts to exclude women and Jews from society based on methodical philosophy, in an era valuing human equality and scientific thought.

== Weininger and "Jewish self-hatred" ==
Allan Janik, in "Viennese Culture and the Jewish Self-Hatred Hypothesis: A Critique", questions the validity of the concept of "Jewish self-hatred", even when applied to Weininger, reputedly "the thinker who nearly everyone has taken to represent the very archetype of the self-hating Viennese Jewish intellectual". Janik places responsibility for this reputation upon Peter Gay. Janik doubts that such a concept as "Jewish self-hatred" is applicable to Weininger in any case, because, although he was of Jewish descent, "it is less than clear that he had a Jewish identity" to reject. In Janik's view, Gay misunderstands the role of religion in Jewish identity and "seems to smuggle in a whole lot of covert theological baggage in secularized form", resulting in "a piece of covert metaphysics parading as social science".

== Portrayals ==
Weininger is played by Paulus Manker in Ildikó Enyedi's My 20th Century (1989).

== Works ==
- Geschlecht und Charakter: Eine prinzipielle Untersuchung (in German). Vienna and Leipzig: Wilhelm Braumüller. 1903.
- Über die letzten Dinge (PDF) (in German). Vienna and Leipzig: Wilhelm Braumüller. 1904. Archived from the original (PDF) on 2016-03-03.
- (in German) Geschlecht und Charakter: Eine prinzipielle Untersuchung, neunzehnte, unveränderte Auflage mit einem Bildnisse des Verfassers (Wien und Leipzig: Wilhelm Braumüller Universitäts-Verlagsbuchhandlung Gesellschaft M. B. H., 1920).
- Sex and Character (Authorised translation from the sixth German ed.). London: William Heinemann; New York: G. P. Putnam's Sons. 1906.
- Sex and Character: An Investigation Of Fundamental Principles. Translated by Ladislaus Löb. Indiana University Press. 2005. ISBN 0-253-34471-9.
- A Translation of Weininger's Über die letzten Dinge (1904/1907), On Last Things. Translated by Steven Burns. Lewiston, Queenston and Lampeter: Edwin Mellen Press. 2001. ISBN 0-7734-7400-5.
- Collected Aphorisms, Notebook and Letters to A Friend (PDF) (in English and German). Translated by Martin Dudaniec. 2002. ISBN 0-9581336-2-X.
