= Object of the mind =

Object that exists in the imagination

An object of the mind is an object that exists in the mind or imagination, but which, in the real world, can only be represented or modelled. Some such objects are abstractions, concepts and scenarios in literature and fiction.

Closely related are intentional objects, which are what thoughts and feelings are about (intentionality), even if they are not about anything real (such as thoughts about unicorns, or feelings of apprehension about a dental appointment which is subsequently cancelled). However, intentional objects may coincide with real objects (as in thoughts about horses, or a feeling of regret about a missed appointment).

== Mathematical objects ==
Mathematics and geometry describe abstract objects that sometimes correspond to familiar shapes, and sometimes do not. Circles, triangles, rectangles, and so forth describe two-dimensional shapes that are often found in the real world. However, mathematical formulas do not describe individual physical circles, triangles, or rectangles. They describe ideal shapes that are objects of the mind. The incredible precision of mathematical expression permits a vast applicability of mental abstractions to real life situations.

Many more mathematical formulas describe shapes that are unfamiliar, or do not necessarily correspond to objects in the real world. For example, the Klein bottle is a one-sided, sealed surface with no inside or outside (in other words, it is the three-dimensional equivalent of the Möbius strip). Such objects can be represented by twisting and cutting or taping pieces of paper together, as well as by computer simulations. To hold them in the imagination, abstractions such as extra or fewer dimensions are necessary.

== Logical sequences ==
If-then arguments posit logical sequences that sometimes include objects of the mind. For example, a counterfactual argument proposes a hypothetical or subjunctive possibility which could or would be true, but might not be false. Conditional sequences involving subjunctives use intensional language, which is studied by modal logic, whereas classical logic studies the extensional language of necessary and sufficient conditions.

In general, a logical antecedent is a sufficient condition, and a logical consequent is a necessary condition (or the contingency) in a logical conditional. But logical conditionals accounting only for necessity and sufficiency do not always reflect every day if-then reasoning, and for this reason they are sometimes known as material conditionals. In contrast, indicative conditionals, sometimes known as non-material conditionals, attempt to describe if-then reasoning involving hypotheticals, fictions, or counterfactuals.

Truth tables for if-then statements identify four unique combinations of premises and conclusions: true premises and true conclusions; false premises and true conclusions; true premises and false conclusions; false premises and false conclusions. Strict conditionals assign a positive truth-value to every case except the case of a true premise and a false conclusion. This is sometimes regarded as counterintuitive, but makes more sense when false conditions are understood as objects of the mind.

=== False antecedent ===
A false antecedent is a premise known to be false, fictional, imaginary, or unnecessary. In a conditional sequence, a false antecedent may be the basis for any consequence, true or false.

The subjects of literature are sometimes false antecedents. Examples include the contents of false documents, the origins of stand-alone phenomena, or the implications of loaded words. Moreover, artificial sources, personalities, events, and histories. False antecedents are sometimes referred to as "nothing", or "nonexistent", whereas nonexistent referents are not referred to.

Art and acting often portray scenarios without any antecedent other than an artist's imagination. For example, mythical heroes, legendary creatures, gods and goddesses.

=== False consequent ===
A false consequent, in contrast, is a conclusion known to be false, fictional, imaginary, or insufficient. In a conditional statement, a fictional conclusion is known as a non sequitur, which literally means out of sequence. A conclusion that is out of sequence is not contingent on any premises that precede it, and it does not follow from them, so such a sequence is not conditional. A conditional sequence is a connected series of statements. A false consequent cannot follow from true premises in a connected sequence. But, on the other hand, a false consequent can follow from a false antecedent.

As an example, the name of a team, a genre, or a nation is a collective term applied ex post facto to a group of distinct individuals. None of the individuals on a sports team is the team itself, nor is any musical chord a genre, nor any person America. The name is an identity for a collection that is connected by consensus or reference, but not by sequence. A different name could equally follow, but it would have different social or political significance.

== Philosophy ==
In metaphysics and ontology, Austrian philosopher Alexius Meinong advanced nonexistent objects in the 19th and 20th century within a "theory of objects". He was interested in intentional states which are directed at nonexistent objects. Starting with the "principle of intentionality", mental phenomena are intentionally directed towards an object. People may imagine, desire or fear something that does not exist. Other philosophers concluded that intentionality is not a real relation and therefore does not require the existence of an object, while Meinong concluded there is an object for every mental state whatsoever—if not an existent then at least a nonexistent one.

=== Philosophy of mind ===
In philosophy of mind, mind–body dualism is the doctrine that mental activities exist apart from the physical body, notably posited by René Descartes in Meditations on First Philosophy.

== Invented sources ==
Many objects in fiction follow the example of false antecedents or false consequents. For example, The Lord of the Rings by J.R.R. Tolkien is based on an imaginary book. In the Appendices to The Lord of the Rings, Tolkien's characters name the Red Book of Westmarch as the source material for The Lord of the Rings, which they describe as a translation. But the Red Book of Westmarch is a fictional document that chronicles events in an imaginary world.

== Convenient fictions ==
Social reality is composed of many standards and inventions that facilitate communication, but which are ultimately objects of the mind. For example, money is an object of the mind which currency represents. Similarly, languages signify ideas and thoughts.

Objects of the mind are frequently involved in the roles that people play. For example, acting is a profession which predicates real jobs on fictional premises. Charades is a game people play by guessing imaginary objects from short play-acts.

Imaginary personalities and histories are sometimes invented to enhance the verisimilitude of fictional universes, and/or the immersion of role-playing games. In the sense that they exist independently of extant personalities and histories, they are believed to be fictional characters and fictional time frames.

Science fiction is abundant with future times, alternate times, and past times that are objects of the mind. For example, in the novel Nineteen Eighty-Four by George Orwell, the number 1984 represented a year that had not yet passed.

Calendar dates also represent objects of the mind, specifically, past and future times. In The Transformers: The Movie, which was released in 1986, the narration opens with the statement, "It is the year 2005." In 1986, that statement was futuristic. During the year 2005, that reference to the year 2005 was factual. Now, The Transformers: The Movie is retro-futuristic. The number 2005 did not change, but the object of the mind that it represents did change.

Deliberate invention also may reference an object of the mind. The intentional invention of fiction for the purpose of deception is usually referred to as lying, in contrast to invention for entertainment or art. Invention is also often applied to problem solving. In this sense the physical invention of materials is associated with the mental invention of fictions.

Convenient fictions also occur in science.

== Science ==
The theoretical posits of one era's scientific theories may be demoted to mere objects of the mind by subsequent discoveries: some standard examples include phlogiston and ptolemaic epicycles.

This raises questions, in the debate between scientific realism and instrumentalism about the status of current posits, such as black holes and quarks.

The situation is further complicated by the existence in scientific practice of entities which are explicitly held not to be real, but which nonetheless serve a purpose—convenient fictions. Examples include field lines, centers of gravity, and electron holes in semiconductor theory.

== Self-reference ==
A reference that names an imaginary source is in some sense also a self-reference. A self-reference automatically makes a comment about itself. Premises that name themselves as premises are premises by self-reference; conclusions that name themselves as conclusions are conclusions by self-reference.

In their respective imaginary worlds the Necronomicon, The Hitchhiker's Guide to the Galaxy, and the Red Book of Westmarch are realities, but only because they are referred to as real. Authors use this technique to invite readers to pretend or to make-believe that their imaginary world is real. In the sense that the stories that quote these books are true, the quoted books exist; in the sense that the stories are fiction, the quoted books do not exist.

== See also ==
- Abstraction
- Existence
- Intentionality
- Noumenon
- The Concept of Mind
- Unobservable
- Impossible world
- Incompleteness theorems
