= Alois Höfler =

Austrian philosopher and psychologist

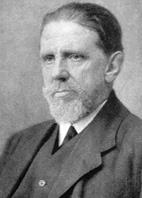
- Born: 6 April 1853; Kirchdorf an der Krems, Austrian Empire
- Died: 26 February 1922 (aged 68); Vienna, Austria

Education
- Education: University of Graz (PhD, 1886); University of Vienna (Dr. phil. hab., 1894)
- Theses: Some Laws of Incompatibility between Judgments (1886); Psychic Work (1894)
- Doctoral advisor: Alexius Meinong
- Other advisor: Franz Brentano

Philosophical work
- Era: 19th-/20th-century philosophy
- Region: Western philosophy
- School: Austrian realism; Brentano school
- Institutions: Theresianum; German University of Prague; University of Vienna
- Main interests: Epistemology, logic, philosophy of education, philosophy of science, psychology
- Notable ideas: Early theoretical contributions to Gestalt psychology

Alois Höfler (German: [ˈhøːflɐ]; April 6, 1853 – February 26, 1922) was an Austrian philosopher and university professor of education. He was seen by the logical positivist Otto Neurath as an important link between Bernard Bolzano's work and the Vienna Circle.

== Biography ==
Alois Höfler was born in Kirchdorf in Upper Austria. His father and mother died while he was in his early and middle teens. He and his two younger sisters were then raised by a second mother, Amalie Boheim. He had four sons with his wife Auguste Dornhöffer, including Otto Höfler.

In the fall of 1871, Höfler entered the University of Vienna, where he studied mathematics and physics with Ludwig Boltzmann and Josef Stefan. After his teaching examination in 1876 at the age of 23, he taught in the Josefstädter-gymnasium and other gymnasiums (advanced secondary schools) in Vienna. He received his doctoral degree at Graz in 1885, under Alexius Meinong's supervision, with a thesis titled Some Laws of Incompatibility between Judgments (Einige Gesetze der Unverträglichkeiten zwischen Urteilen). He received his habilitation at Vienna in 1894 with a thesis titled Psychic Work (Psychische Arbeit).

During the 1870s and 1880s, Höfler also attended evening classes taught by Franz Brentano and Meinong. His philosophical view was strongly influenced by Meinong. From 1881 to 1903, he taught mathematics, physics, and philosophical propaedeutics at the grammar school of the Theresian Academy in Vienna. He became professor of philosophy and pedagogy at the German University of Prague in 1903 (as successor to Otto Willmann) and at the University of Vienna in 1907 (as successor to Theodor Vogt).

His increasing interest in philosophy and in making it more scientific led him to study and write increasingly on logic and psychology as well. In the opinion of the ardent logical positivist Otto Neurath, through his involvement in the School of Brentano, Höfler was an important connection between the work on logic of Bernard Bolzano and the Vienna Circle. In 1914, he reprinted the 77-year-old Bolzano's Theory of Science, which was said to be almost impossible to find at the time. He also loved music, poetry, and the arts. He strongly opposed attempts to reduce their role in schools.

Höfler died in Vienna.

== Sources ==
- "Reviewed Work: Wissenschaftslehre by Bernard Bolzano, Alois Höfler". Revue de Métaphysique et de Morale. 22 (4). Presses Universitaires de France: 15–16. 1914. JSTOR 40895349.
- Blackmore, John T; Itagaki, R; Tanaka, S (2001). "Alois Höfler — Polymath". Ernst Mach's Vienna, 1895-1930, Or, Phenomenalism As Philosophy of Science. Dordrecht: Kluwer Academic. pp. 237–276.
- Dewalque, Arnaud (2017). "Chapter 25: The Rise of the Brentano School". In Kriegel, U (ed.). The Routledge Handbook of Franz Brentano and the Brentano School (1 ed.). Routledge. doi:10.4324/9781315776460. ISBN 9781315776460.
- Fisette, Denis (2014). "Austrian Philosophy and its Institutions: Remarks on the Philosophical Society of the University of Vienna (1888-1938)". In Reboul, A. (ed.). Philosophical papers dedicated to Kevin Mulligan. Berlin: Springer. pp. 349–374.
- Fisette, Denis (2021). "Robert Zimmermann and Herbartianism in Vienna: The Critical Reception of Brentano and his Followers". In Maigné, Carole (ed.). Herbartism in Austrian Philosophy. Berlin, Boston: De Gruyter. pp. 33–62. doi:10.1515/9783110747324-003. ISBN 9783110747324.
- Heinrich, Beck (2010). "Höfler". In Brather, Sebastian; Heizmann, Wilhelm; Patzold, Steffen (eds.). Germanische Altertumskunde Online. Berlin, New York: De Gruyter.
- Höfer, Ulf, ed. (1994). Verzeichnis des Nachlasses von Alois Hôfler (1853-1922) (PDF). Vol. Teil 1. Graz: Forschungsstelle und Dokumentationszentrum für österreichische Philosophie.
- Miskiewicz, Wioletta (2005). "« L'affaire Zimmermann ». À propos des influences bolzaniennes dans l'École de Lvov et de Varsovie". In Thouard, Denis (ed.). Aristote au xixe siècle. Cahiers de philologie. Villeneuve d'Ascq: Presses universitaires du Septentrion. pp. 377–394. ISBN 978-2-7574-2252-6.
- Reichert, Waltraud (1972). "Höfler, Alois". In Bayerische Akademie der Wissenschaften (ed.). Neue Deutsche Biographie. Vol. 9. p. 312-313.
- Rollinger, Robin D. (1999). Husserl's Position in the School of Brentano. Dordrecht: Kluwer Academic Publishers.
