= Abstract object theory =

Branch of metaphysics regarding abstract objects

Abstract object theory (AOT) is a branch of metaphysics regarding abstract objects. Originally devised by metaphysician Edward Zalta in 1981, the theory was an expansion of mathematical Platonism.

== Overview ==
Abstract Objects: An Introduction to Axiomatic Metaphysics (1983) is the title of a publication by Edward Zalta that outlines abstract object theory.

AOT is a dual predication approach (also known as "dual copula strategy") to abstract objects influenced by the contributions of Alexius Meinong and his student Ernst Mally. On Zalta's account, there are two modes of predication: some objects (the ordinary concrete ones around us, like tables and chairs) exemplify properties, while others (abstract objects—e.g., numbers, possible worlds, and so-called "nonexistent objects" such as the round square and Meinong's "mountain made of gold") merely encode them. While the objects that exemplify properties are discovered through traditional empirical means, a simple set of axioms allows us to know about objects that encode properties. For every set of properties, there is exactly one object that encodes exactly that set of properties and no others. This allows for a formalized ontology.

A notable feature of AOT is that several significant paradoxes in naive predication theory (namely Romane Clark's paradox undermining the earliest version of Héctor-Neri Castañeda's guise theory, Alan McMichael's paradox, and Daniel Kirchner's paradox) do not arise within it. AOT employs restricted abstraction schemata to avoid such paradoxes.

In 2007, Zalta and Branden Fitelson introduced the term computational metaphysics to describe the implementation and investigation of formal, axiomatic metaphysics in an automated reasoning environment.

== See also ==
- Abstract and concrete
- Abstractionism (philosophy of mathematics)
- Algebra of concepts
- Mathematical universe hypothesis
- Modal Meinongianism
- Modal neo-logicism
- Object of the mind
- Objective precision
