= Political views of Bertrand Russell =

Views of the British philosopher on the state and society

Aspects of philosopher, mathematician and social activist Bertrand Russell's views on society changed over nearly 80 years of prolific writing, beginning with his early work in 1896, until his death in February 1970.

== Activism ==
Political and social activism occupied much of Russell's time for most of his long life, which makes his prodigious and seminal writing on a wide range of technical and non-technical subjects all the more remarkable.

Russell remained politically active to the end of his life, writing to and exhorting world leaders and lending his name to various causes. Some maintain that during his last few years he gave his youthful followers too much license and that they used his name for some outlandish purposes of which a more attentive Russell would not have approved. There is evidence to show that he became aware of this when he fired his private secretary, Ralph Schoenman, then a young firebrand of the radical left.

=== Pacifism, war, and nuclear weapons ===
Russell was originally a Liberal Imperialist but in 1901 converted to anti-imperialism, pacifism and a Pro-Boer standpoint with regards to the Second Boer War. He was later involved in the Union of Democratic Control.

He resisted specific wars on the grounds that they were contrary to the interests of civilisation, and thus immoral. On the other hand, his 1915 article on "The Ethics of War", he defended wars of colonisation on the same utilitarian grounds: he felt conquest was justified if the side with the more advanced civilisation could put the land to better use.

Russell's activism against British participation in World War I led to fines, a loss of freedom of travel within Britain, and the non-renewal of his fellowship at Trinity College, Cambridge, and he was eventually sentenced to prison in 1918 on the tenuous grounds that he had interfered in British foreign policy – he had argued that British workers should be wary of the United States Army, for it had experience in strike-breaking. He was released after serving six months, but was still closely supervised until the end of the war. Russell contended that "the abolition of private ownership of land and capital is a necessary step toward any world in which the nations are to live at peace with one another".

In 1943 Russell called his stance towards warfare "relative political pacifism" – he held that war was always a great evil, but in some particularly extreme circumstances (such as when Adolf Hitler threatened to take over Europe) it might be a lesser of multiple evils. In the years leading to World War II, he supported the policy of appeasement; but by 1940 he acknowledged that to preserve democracy, Hitler had to be defeated. This same reluctant value compromise was shared by his acquaintance A.A. Milne.

Russell consistently opposed the continued existence of nuclear weapons ever since their first use. However, on 20 November 1948, in a public speech at Westminster School, addressing a gathering arranged by the New Commonwealth, Russell shocked some observers with comments that seemed to suggest a preemptive nuclear strike on the Soviet Union might be justified. Russell apparently argued that the threat of war between the United States and the Soviet Union would enable the United States to force the Soviet Union to accept the Baruch Plan for international atomic energy control. (Earlier in the year he had written in the same vein to Walter W. Marseille.) Russell felt this plan "had very great merits and showed considerable generosity, when it is remembered that America still had an unbroken nuclear monopoly." (Has Man a Future?, 1961).

Nicholas Griffin of McMaster University, in his book The Selected Letters of Bertrand Russell: The Public Years, 1914–1970, interpreted Russell's wording as advocating not the actual use of the atom bomb, but merely its diplomatic use as a massive source of leverage over the actions of the Soviets.

Griffin's interpretation was disputed by Nigel Lawson; the former British Chancellor, who was present at the speech. Lawson claims it was quite clear that Russell was advocating an actual first strike, a view that is consistent with that reported by Hermann Bondi in Bondi's autobiography (Science, Churchill and Me, 1990, p60) recounting Russell's views from the time when Russell and Bondi were fellows of Trinity College in Cambridge. Whichever interpretation is correct, Russell later relented, instead arguing for mutual disarmament by the nuclear powers, possibly linked to some form of world government.

The Soviet interpretation seems to be negative. Izvestia dismissed Bertrand Russell, as “the English Fascist Malthusian Philosopher.” Hitler had “found worthy successors in England,” wrote one Soviet commentator. Fortunately, though, humanity was not compelled to take “the path of degeneration along which Fascist creatures like Bertrand Russell are leading it.”

In 1955, Russell released the Russell-Einstein Manifesto, co-signed by Albert Einstein and nine other leading scientists and intellectuals, a document which led to the first of the Pugwash Conferences on Science and World Affairs in 1957. In 1957-58, Russell became the first president of the Campaign for Nuclear Disarmament, which advocated unilateral nuclear disarmament by Britain. He resigned two years later when the CND would not support civil disobedience, and formed the Committee of 100. In September 1961 he was imprisoned for a week under the Justices of the Peace Act 1361 for refusing to call off a huge ban-the-bomb demonstration at the Ministry of Defence organised by the Committee of 100. He served the sentence in the hospital of Brixton Prison.

During the Cuban Missile Crisis, Russell sent telegrams to US President John F. Kennedy, Soviet Premier Nikita Khrushchev, the UN Secretary-General U Thant and British Prime Minister Harold Macmillan. His telegrams were greatly critical of Kennedy, who he had already singled out earlier as "more dangerous than Hitler", and tolerant of Khrushchev. Khrushchev replied with a long letter, published by the Russian news agency ITAR-TASS, which was mainly addressed to Kennedy and the Western world.

Increasingly concerned about the potential danger to humanity arising from nuclear weapons and other scientific discoveries, he also joined with Einstein, Robert Oppenheimer, Joseph Rotblat and other eminent scientists of the day to establish the World Academy of Art and Science which was formally constituted in 1960.

The Bertrand Russell Peace Foundation and its publishing imprint Spokesman Books began work in 1963 to carry forward Russell's work for peace, human rights and social justice.

==== JFK Assassination ====
Russell criticised the official account of the assassination of John F. Kennedy in "16 Questions on the Assassination", 1964. He was thanked in the acknowledgements section of Mark Lane's book Rush to Judgment for being "kind enough to read the manuscript and make suggestions", and after Simon & Schuster had declined to publish the book, Russell attempted to convince them otherwise. He also served as President of the British Who Killed Kennedy? Committee, in Russell's words the organisation was set up "for the purpose of making known the material [Lane] has uncovered and his further findings".

He is also thanked in Jim Garrison's On the Trail of the Assassins for "his early encouragement of my efforts".

Russell condemned the Warren Report as a "sorrily incompetent document" and said "it is clear that much is still being hidden". He argued that there were a number of "disturbing anomalies" regarding the assassination and that the Warren Commission had failed to deal with these doubts, that it instead "evades the facts". He believed that medical evidence had been altered and that "three contradictory official versions" had been put out.

==== Korea and Vietnam ====
He began public opposition to US policy in Vietnam with a letter to The New York Times dated 28 March 1963. By the autumn of 1966, he had completed the manuscript War Crimes in Vietnam. Then, using the American justifications for the Nuremberg Trials, Russell, along with Jean-Paul Sartre, organised what he called an international War Crimes Tribunal, the Russell Tribunal.

Russell supported Korean nationalism, referring to North Koreans and South Koreans as "cousins".

=== Communism, anarchism and socialism ===
Russell was, prior to being a socialist, a Georgist.

In 1914 he wrote to Lady Ottoline Morrell saying "It is clear the Socialists are the hope of the world". Russell expressed support for guild socialism. He was also an admirer of Franklin Delano Roosevelt and Eduard Bernstein.

Russell expressed great hope in "the Communist experiment". However, when he visited the Soviet Union and met Vladimir Lenin in 1920, he was unimpressed with the system in place. On his return he wrote a critical tract, The Practice and Theory of Bolshevism. In later years he said of Lenin that he was "less impressed by Lenin than I expected to be" but also that he was a "great man". He considered him to be similar to a religious zealot as he said that Lenin believed "anything could be proved by quoting a text in Marx and he was quite incapable of supposing that there could be anything in Marx which wasn't right".

While in the Soviet Union he was "infinitely unhappy in this atmosphere – stifled by its utilitarianism, its indifference to love and beauty and the life of impulse." He was critical of Soviet Russia but still believed "that Communism is necessary to the world". Despite his criticism he nevertheless praised the Russian Revolution as "heroism" which had "fired men’s hopes in a way which was essential to the realization of Communism in the future" and that therefore "Bolshevism deserves the gratitude and admiration of all the progressive part of mankind"

Later in his life, Russell completely denounced Marxism and communism, stating that:

The theoretical doctrines of Communism are for the most part derived from Marx. My objections to Marx are of two sorts: one, that he was muddle-headed; and the other, that his thinking was almost entirely inspired by hatred. [...] I have always disagreed with Marx. My first hostile criticism of him was published in 1896. But my objections to modern Communism go deeper than my objections to Marx. It is the abandonment of democracy that I find particularly disastrous. [...] Communism is a doctrine bred of poverty, hatred and strife. Its spread can only be arrested by diminishing the area of poverty and hatred.

In the 1922 and 1923 general elections Russell stood as a Labour Party candidate in the Chelsea constituency, but only on the basis that he knew he was extremely unlikely to be elected in such a safe Conservative seat, and he was not on either occasion.

He was strongly critical of Joseph Stalin's regime, writing that Stalin was responsible for millions of deaths. Between 1945 and 1947, together with A. J. Ayer and George Orwell, he contributed a series of articles to Polemic, a short-lived British "Magazine of Philosophy, Psychology, and Aesthetics" edited by the ex-Communist Humphrey Slater.

Russell was a consistent enthusiast for democracy and world government, and he advocated the establishment of a democratic international government in some of the essays collected in In Praise of Idleness (1935), and also in Has Man a Future? (1961).

Russell wrote of Michael Bakunin that "we do not find in Bakunin's works a clear picture of the society at which he aimed, or any argument to prove that such a society could be stable." Russell did not believe that an anarchist society was "realizable" but that "it cannot be denied that Kropotkin presents it with extraordinary persuasiveness and charm."

=== Women's suffrage ===
As a young man, Russell was a member of the Liberal Party and wrote in favour of women's suffrage. In his 1910 pamphlet, Anti-Suffragist Anxieties, Russell wrote that some men opposed suffrage because they "fear that their liberty to act in ways that are injurious to women will be curtailed." In May 1907, Russell stood for Parliament as a woman's suffrage candidate in Wimbledon, but was not elected.

=== Sexuality ===
Russell wrote against Victorian notions of morality. Marriage and Morals (1929) expressed his opinion that sex between a man and woman who are not married to each other is not necessarily immoral if they truly love one another, and advocated "trial marriages" or "companionate marriage", formalised relationships whereby young people could legitimately have sexual intercourse without being expected to remain married in the long term or to have children (an idea first proposed by Judge Ben Lindsey). This was enough to raise vigorous protests and denunciations against him during his visit to the United States shortly after the book's publication. Russell was also one of the first intellectuals to advocate open sex education and widespread access to contraception. He also advocated easy divorce, but only if the marriage had produced no children – Russell's view was that parents should remain married but tolerant of each other's sexual infidelity, if they had children. This reflected his life at the time – his second wife Dora was openly having an affair, and would soon become pregnant by another man, but Russell was keen for their children John and Kate to have a "normal" family life.

Russell was also an active supporter of the Homosexual Law Reform Society, being one of the signatories of A.E. Dyson's 1958 letter to The Times calling for a change in the law regarding male homosexual practices, which were partly legalised in 1967, when Russell was still alive.

=== Race ===
As with his views on religion, which developed considerably throughout his long life, Russell's views on the matter of race did not remain fixed. By 1951, Russell was a vocal advocate of racial equality and intermarriage; he penned a chapter on "Racial Antagonism" in New Hopes for a Changing World (1951), which read:

It is sometimes maintained that racial mixture is biologically undesirable. There is no evidence whatever for this view. Nor is there, apparently, any reason to think that Negroes are congenitally less intelligent than white people, but as to that it will be difficult to judge until they have equal scope and equally good social conditions.

— Bertrand Russell, New Hopes for a Changing World (London: Allen & Unwin, 1951, p. 108)

Passages in some of his early writings support birth control. On 16 November 1922, for instance, he gave a lecture to the General Meeting of Dr. Marie Stopes's Society for Constructive Birth Control and Racial Progress on "Birth Control and International Relations", in which he described the importance of extending Western birth control worldwide; his remarks anticipated the population control movement of the 1960s and the role of the United Nations.

This policy may last some time, but in the end under it we shall have to give way—we are only putting off the evil day; the one real remedy is birth control, that is getting the people of the world to limit themselves to those numbers which they can keep upon their own soil... I do not see how we can hope permanently to be strong enough to keep the coloured races out; sooner or later they are bound to overflow, so the best we can do is to hope that those nations will see the wisdom of Birth Control.... We need a strong international authority.

— "Lecture by the Hon. Bertrand Russell", Birth Control News, vol 1, no. 8 (December 1922), p.2

Another passage from early editions of his book Marriage and Morals (1929), which Russell later claimed to be referring only to environmental conditioning, and which he significantly modified in later editions, reads:

In extreme cases, there can be little doubt of the superiority of one race to another [...] It seems on the whole fair to regard Negroes as on the average inferior to white men, although for work in the tropics they are indispensable, so that their extermination (apart from the question of humanity) would be highly undesirable.

— Bertrand Russell, Marriage and Morals, pg. 266 (1929)

However, in 1932 he condemned the "unwarranted assumption" that "Negroes are congenitally inferior to white men" (Education and the Social Order, Chap. 3).

Responding in 1964 to a correspondent's inquiry, "Do you still consider the Negroes an inferior race, as you did when you wrote Marriage and Morals?", Russell replied:

I never held Negroes to be inherently inferior. The statement in Marriage and Morals refers to environmental conditioning. I have had it withdrawn from subsequent editions because it is clearly ambiguous.

— Bertrand Russell, letter dated 17 March 1964 in Dear Bertrand Russell... a selection of his correspondence with the general public, 1950–1968. edited by Barry Feinberg and Ronald Kasrils. (London: Allen & Unwin, 1969, p. 146)

== China ==
In 1922 Russell visited China and remarked that "China, by her resources and her population, is capable of being the greatest power in the world after the United States".

== Israel ==
Before the creation of the state of Israel Russell expressed his support for Zionism. However, after its establishment, Russell would criticise the state of Israel on several occasions. On 31 January 1970, Russell issued a statement condemning "Israel's aggression in the Middle East", and in particular, Israeli bombing raids being carried out deep in Egyptian territory as part of the War of Attrition, which he compared to German bombing raids in the Battle of Britain and the US bombing of Vietnam. He called for an Israeli withdrawal to the pre-Six-Day War borders. This was Russell's final political statement or act. It was read out at the International Conference of Parliamentarians in Cairo on 3 February 1970, the day after his death.

He called for a "world campaign" to "help bring justice to the long-suffering people of the Middle East". He added that "No people anywhere in the world would accept being expelled en masse from their own country; how can anyone require the people of Palestine to accept a punishment that nobody else would tolerate?".

== Eugenics ==
Russell discussed eugenics heavily in his 1929 book Marriage and Morals. He expressed agreement with the basic idea, while criticizing specific views and positions eugenicists held (particularly a strong class bias). Russell accepted a forced sterilization policy for negative eugenics, but only that of "mental defectives", condemning some laws for being overly broad. He also cautioned that eugenics policies had to account for scientific evidence, such as not making claims that all criminal behavior had genetic causes when psychology indicated otherwise. In terms of positive eugenics, he felt that free education should be provided for only to the professional classes, based not on the merits of the children, but of the parents, so that children do not suffer from cramming for scholarship examinations, which causes physical and mental damage. Russell also acknowledge the difficulty of deciding what desirable traits are, and that tradeoffs can exist (e.g. to breed for strength might diminish intelligence). He also acknowledged that to practice eugenics would entail a radical disruption of the family, feeling that a select group from the population might be set apart solely to breed in the future. While finding this idea repugnant, he thought it might nonetheless be effective. Discussing "race" eugenics, he felt the prevalent racist views were largely an excuse for chauvinism, and dismissed concerns about white people being outbred by East Asians. He considered some peoples inferior due to "environmental conditioning". He felt that in the future people might well select sexual partners for procreation voluntarily due to eugenic considerations. Russell felt certain eugenics views would win out in the future and become law. He conceded that it was repugnant to people and a "scientific tyranny" could arise, but felt this would be better than religious tyranny.

However, Russell also frequently stated his deep concern that eugenics would be used for political ends, rather than to improve humanity, stating, for instance, in a 1963 letter to eugenics proponent Julian Huxley, "Exceptional merit is, and always has been, disliked by Authority; and obviously Authority would control the sperm-bank. [...] I am entirely with you as to what eugenics could achieve, but I disagree as to what it would achieve.". This attitude also led to him supporting sterilisation of the "feebleminded", as he felt it, compared to the alternative of committal to an institution, preserved the ability of the sterilised to participate in society, and thus guarded against the possibility that a government would label its political opponents as "feebleminded" to silence them. He also expressed scepticism about the claims contemporary eugenicists made about the influence of heredity, such as in his 1932 book Education and the Social Order where he stated that the "practical inferences" drawn by eugenicists were unscientific due to the lack of knowledge about which traits were hereditary.

== Influence on society ==
Russell often characterised his moral and political writings as lying outside the scope of philosophy, but Russell's admirers and detractors are often more acquainted with his pronouncements on social and political matters, or what some (e.g., biographer Ray Monk) have called his "journalism", than they are with his technical, philosophical work. There is a marked tendency to conflate these matters, and to judge Russell the philosopher on what he himself would certainly consider to be his non-philosophical opinions. Russell often cautioned people to make this distinction. Beginning in the 1920s, Russell wrote frequently for The Nation on changing morals, nuclear disarmament and literature. In 1965, he wrote that the magazine "...has been one of the few voices which has been heard on behalf of individual liberty and social justice consistently throughout its existence."

Paul McCartney, a member of The Beatles, said that after he met with Russell at his house and discussed the Vietnam war with him, McCartney inspired John Lennon and the band to take an anti-war stance.
