= Edith Finch =

Edith Finch may refer to:

- What Remains of Edith Finch, a 2017 first-person walking simulator
- Edith Finch Russell (1900–1978), née Finch, American writer and biographer
- Edith Finch, Countess of Aylesford (c. 1854–1897), English noblewoman
