= Edith Russell =

may refer to:

- Edith Russell (1914–1949), editor of the Millennial Star
- Edith Finch Russell (1900–1978), writer, biographer, and the fourth wife of Bertrand Russell
- Edith Rosenbaum (1879–1975), American fashion buyer, stylist, correspondent, and RMS Titanic survivor, anglicized her surname to Russell
