= The Analysis of Mind =

1921 book by Bertrand Russell

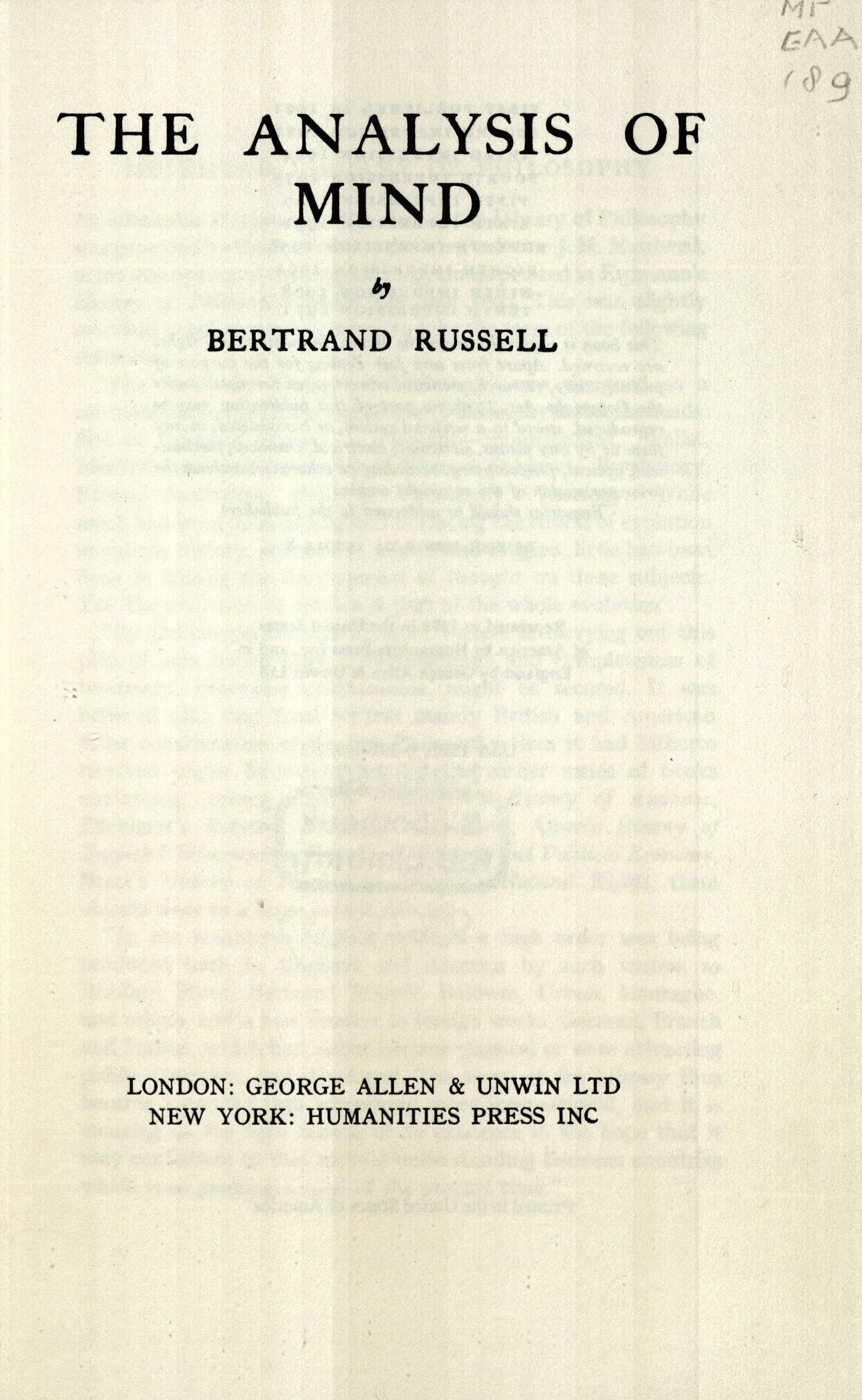
- Author: Bertrand Russell
- Genre: Psychology
- Publication date: 1921

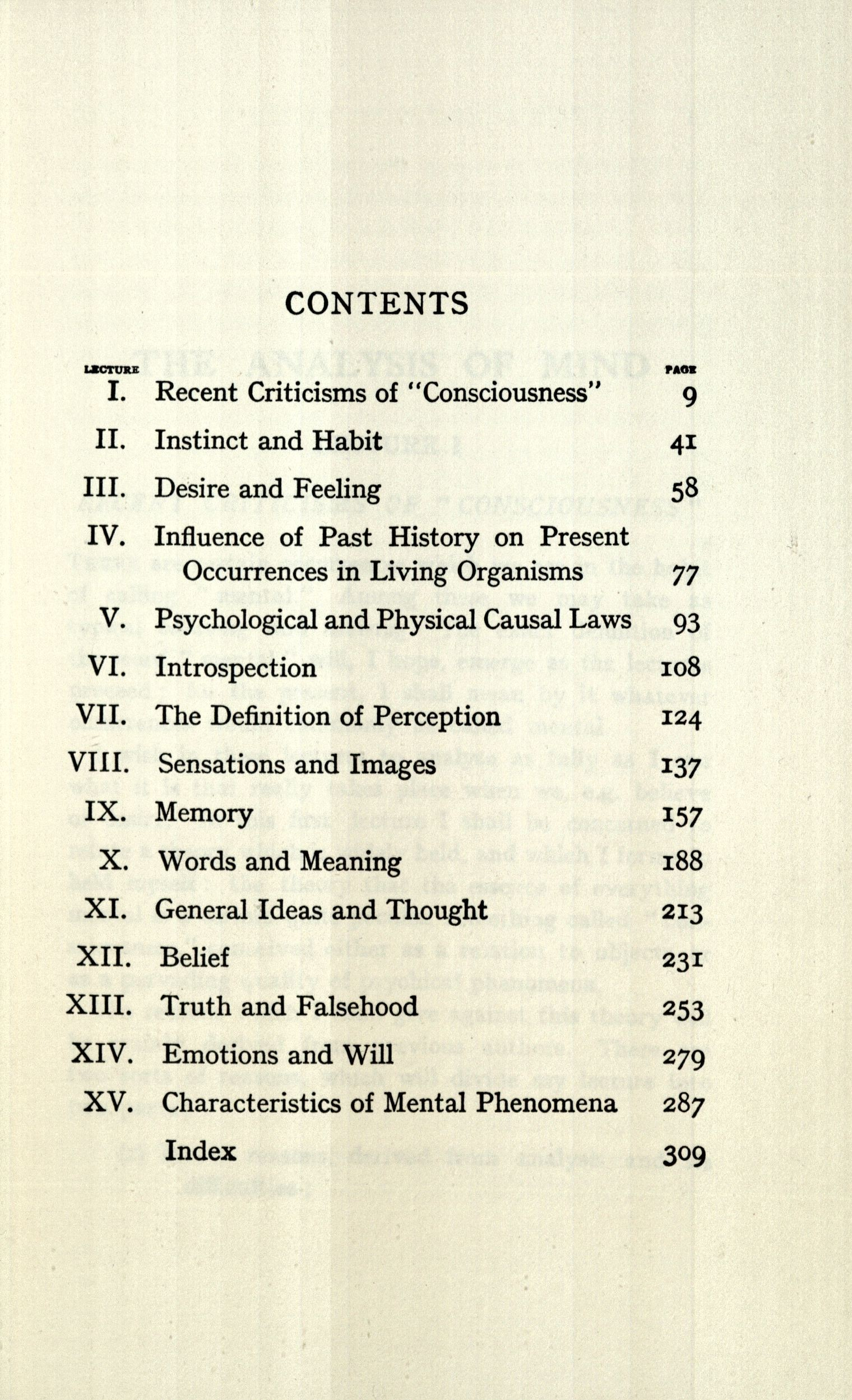
Table of contents

The Analysis of Mind is a book published in 1921 by Bertrand Russell. The book uses philosophical ideas from the period of its publication, to describe how the mind works. The book attempts to define the mind, through the same way the physical world is explained, primarily through the use of sensations.

== Context ==
Prior to the publication of "The Analysis of Mind", the mind's understanding was covered by philosophers, such as Descartes, Locke, Berkeley, Hume and Reid. Descartes first published his mind-body dualism theory in the 17th century. He believed that the mind and body are inherently different kinds of substances: the mind is in charge of imagination, emotions and sensations, which don't follow the laws of physics that govern the body. In 1689, Locke shifted the debate on the mind by advancing empiricism, arguing that all knowledge comes from sense experience, and therefore, learning originates in experience of the world. He issued "An Essay Concerning Human Understanding", which in the 21st century is recognized as the start of empiricism. Building on this, in the 18th century, authors such as Berkeley and Reid proposed new philosophical doctrines: idealism and realism respectively. Berkeley proposed that "ideas" are the intrinsic reality, and that the external world is a reflection of these; while Reid suggested the physical world exists separately from humans and their ideas. Behaviorism emerged in the early 20th century, with Pavlov's classical conditioning, and Watson's "Little Albert" experiment. The publication of "The Analysis of Mind" happened shortly after.

Russel studied Mathematics at Cambridge University between 1890 and 1894. After finishing his studies, he worked at the British Embassy in Paris, where he realized he wanted to pursue theoretical work as a writer and philosopher. In 1915 he published "Our Knowledge of the External World" which laid a foundation for some of his later work. Russel was fined by the British court in 1916 for ilegal distribution of a pacifist manifesto which criticized the British government. Russell admitted to writing the manifesto but denied to pay the fine, which resulted in his library being put up for sale; yet, his friends recovered the books by buying them. In 1918, Russell published an article in which he criticized the British government and how their wartime policies, which led to his six-month imprisonment. During his time in prison, Russell began to write "The analysis of mind". He believed fear—among others fear of the unknown—was the root of all human misery; and in the book he attempts to explain all the unknowns about how the mind behaves. In 1920, during his professorship in the University of Peking; the book was finished.

== Contents ==
The book is divided in 15 chapters which the author calls lectures. Each one covers a new theme that assists in trying to define the mind in the same way the physical world is described. The first lecture concentrates in explaining Russell's objective throughout the book, which is to model a superior conceptualization of the mind. The second lecture explains different kind of movements humans can perform, and how these are differentiated from habits. It speculates about habit formation and examines already existing theories. Lecture 3 discusses the concept of desire. In it, Russell mentions how discomfort drives people's actions, and how these can demonstrate hidden desires. Lecture 4 introduces mnemic causation, which is a concept formulated by Russell, seeking to explain how encountering a past experience can retrieve the whole memory back. Lecture 5 challenges old ideas of cause and effect, and clarifies why laws of change are more applicable to real life. In lecture 6 he criticizes introspection. Lecture 7 explains how perception is a combination of sensations and past experience. In lecture 8 he differentiates between sensations and images to explain the difference between matter and mind. Lecture 9 describes what a true memory is, and how these can be recognized. Lecture 10 describes how words connect symbols to meanings, such as behaviors and thoughts, and lecture 11 addresses abstract thinking. Lecture 12 and 13 compliment each other. First, belief is defined as how content is kept in the mind, and then truth is described as how these content reflects objective facts. Lecture 14 uses sensations and images to explain emotions; and finally, lecture 15 summarizes the previous lectures and states Russell's desire of having science one day unifying mind and matter.

== Reception ==
After publishing "The Analysis of Mind", Russell gave lectures in London School of Economics about the topic of the book. Since its publication, the book was known for its clear style; educated people who knew little about the subject could still grasp what the book introduced. A critical view from one century later holds that Russell attempted to merge Freud's, William James' and Hume's theories to describe the mind's complexity; but failed to generate a convincing product. He still recognized that Russell, with the knowledge available in the early 20th century, made the most out of what could be done. Right after its publication, the topics and ideas Russell raised in the book received noticeable recognition.

It was the neutral monism standpoint presented by Russell in the book, that guided Carnap when writing "Der Logische Aufbau der Welt" in 1928. It's after "The Analysis of Mind's" publication that linguistics and psychology started to appear more in articles and newspapers. For example, behaviorist psychology gained attention in the 1920's due to the school of Watson. Early behaviorists of the time were Watson, Max Meyer and Weiss, who believed behavior can solely be explained with a stimulus and a response. Other viewpoints have contradicted the The Analysis of Mind's foundation. For example, in 1997, David Chalmers published his book "The Conscious Mind", in which he states that consciousness can't be explained by physical processes alone.

During the 1920's and 30's, Russell founded an experimental school focused on cultivating thinking and rationale. In the late 1930's, he taught at UCLA, and was offered a teaching position at a university in New York. He issued many books, such as "The Analysis of Matter" in 1927. In 1945, he published "A History of Western Philosophy", which is one of Russell's most widely read books. In 1949, Bertrand Russell was granted the Nobel prize for literature, considering his many significant contributions to the field.
