= Why Men Fight =

Book by Bertrand Russell

Why Men Fight: A Method of Abolishing the International Duel
- Author: Bertrand Russell
- Language: English
- Genre: War
- Published: 1917
- Publisher: The Century Company
- Publication place: US

Why Men Fight: A Method of Abolishing the International Duel is a 1917 book by mathematician and philosopher Bertrand Russell printed in 1917, in response to the devastations of WWI, in New York by The Century Co.

The work was republished with the title Principles of Social Reconstruction.

== Contents ==
The book is composed of eight chapters.

- The Principles of Growth
- The State
- War as an Institution
- Property
- Education
- Marriage and the Population Question
- Religion and the Churches
- What We Can Do
