= List of fellows of the Royal Society elected in 1908 =

This is a list of fellows of the Royal Society elected in 1908.

== Fellows ==
1. Antoine Henri Becquerel (1852–1908)
2. David James Hamilton (1849–1909)
3. Silas Weir Mitchell (1829–1914)
4. Friedrich Robert Helmert (1843–1917)
5. William Gowland (1842–1922)
6. William Halse Rivers Rivers (1864–1922)
7. Charles Immanuel Forsyth Major (1843–1923)
8. Arthur Dendy (1865–1925)
9. H. H. Asquith (1852–1928)
10. Shibasaburo Kitasato (1852–1931)
11. Sir Dugald Clerk
12. Otto Stapf
13. William Barlow
14. Edmund Neville Nevill
15. Herbrand Russell, 11th Duke of Bedford
16. Sir Jocelyn Field Thorpe
17. Randal Thomas Mowbray Rawdon Berkeley
18. John Stanley Gardiner (1872–1946)
19. Henry Horatio Dixon
20. John Hilton Grace
21. Bertrand Russell
