= Emotive conjugation =

Rhetorical technique to create bias

In rhetoric, emotive or emotional conjugation (also known as Russell's conjugation) is a rhetorical technique used to create an intrinsic bias towards or against a piece of information. Bias is created by using the emotional connotation of a word to prime a response from the audience by creating a loaded statement. When used seriously, such loaded language can lend false support to an argument through emotional connotation and implication rather than through fact.

== History and research ==
Emotional conjugation was originally defined by Bertrand Russell in 1948 on the BBC Radio program, The Brains Trust. During an interview, he gave multiple examples of emotive conjugation, one of them being the following:

I am firm, you are obstinate, he is a pig-headed fool.

While firm, obstinate, and pig-headed are all synonymous with stubbornness, the emotive connotations of these words are different. Firm carries a positive connotation, obstinate carries a neutral (or slightly negative) connotation, and pig-headed fool carries a negative connotation. Thus, most individuals have a positive reaction toward the speaker, and a negative reaction toward the pig-headed fool. Russell notes that no additional information is given on each individual, yet a strong opinion on each individual forms nonetheless. Russell explains this phenomenon by defining humans as social creatures. He claims that the mind is always asking "What is the social consequence of accepting the facts as they are?" which causes the audience to mimic the emotions presented by the speaker.

Russell's claims are supported by Frank Luntz' study on changes in authoritative language conducted in the 1990s. Luntz found that the majority of opinions were reached based on the emotive conjugation that was used without consideration of any underlying facts. Luntz noted consistency in these results, even in situations where participants would contradict themselves. For example, an individual would oppose the idea of a "death tax" while supporting an "estate tax" despite the fact that the descriptions were the same. Luntz also notes that these contradictions would still appear if the definitions were given in close proximity to one another. An example Luntz mentioned was the emotive conjugation of "illegal aliens" being used in place of "undocumented immigrants." While these phrases refer to the same group of people, the former was met with a negative reaction in comparison to the latter.

== Examples ==
=== In English ===
Emotive conjugation uses words that are synonymous in their factual definitions but different in their emotional connotation. While most examples are in triads, emotive conjugation can be used with a single subject. Examples of emotive conjugation include:

- I am sparkling; you are unusually talkative; he is drunk.
- I know my own mind; you like things to be just so; they have to have everything their way.
- I am a freedom fighter, you are a rebel, and he is a terrorist.
- I am eccentric, you are weird, he is mad.
- I am righteously indignant, you are annoyed, he is making a fuss over nothing.
- I have reconsidered the matter, you have changed your mind, he has gone back on his word.

== In popular culture ==
The inherent incongruity also lends itself to humor, as employed by Bernard Woolley in the BBC television series Yes, Minister and Yes, Prime Minister:

It's one of those irregular verbs, isn't it?
I have an independent mind, You are eccentric, He is round the twist.

That's another of those irregular verbs, isn't it?
I give confidential press briefings; you leak; he's being charged under section 2A of the Official Secrets Act.

== See also ==
- Linguistic intergroup bias
- Linguistic relativity
