= Bertrand Russell =

English philosopher and logician (1872–1970)

The Right Honourable The Earl Russell OM FRS
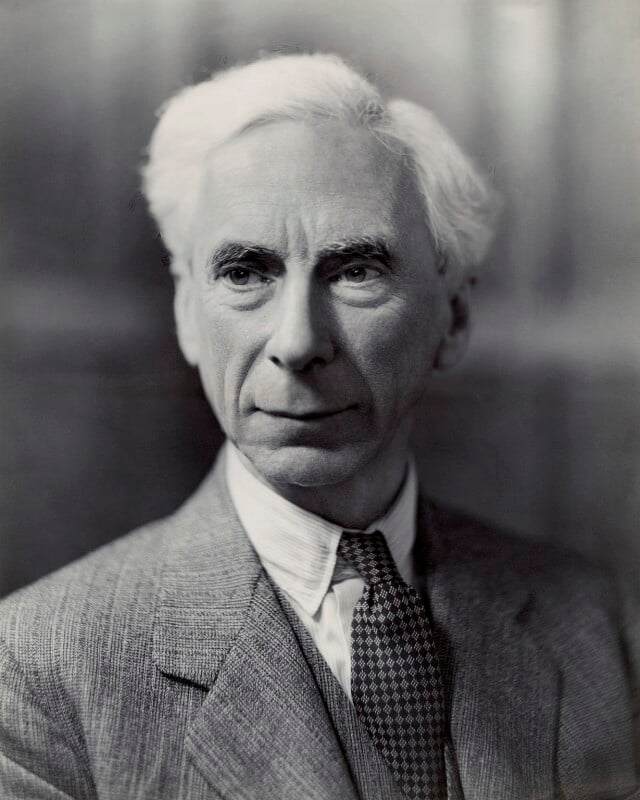
- Russell in 1936
- Born: Bertrand Arthur William Russell; 18 May 1872; Trellech, Monmouthshire (Note: Though today in Wales, Monmouthshire's status was ambiguous at the time and was even considered by some to be in England, which it borders.)
- Died: 2 February 1970 (aged 97); Penrhyndeudraeth, Merionethshire, Wales
- Spouses: Alys Pearsall Smith (m. 1894; div. 1921); Dora Black (m. 1921; div. 1935); Patricia Spence (m. 1936; div. 1952); Edith Finch (m. 1952)
- Children: 3, including John, 4th Earl Russell, and Conrad, 5th Earl Russell
- Parent(s): Viscount and Viscountess Amberley
- Relatives: John Russell, 1st Earl Russell (grandfather); Baroness Stanley of Alderley (grandmother); Frank Russell, 2nd Earl Russell (brother)
- Awards: De Morgan Medal (1932); Sylvester Medal (1934); Nobel Prize in Literature (1950); Kalinga Prize (1957); Jerusalem Prize (1963)

Education
- Education: Trinity College, Cambridge (BA, 1893)
- Academic advisors: J. M. E. McTaggart; James Ward; A. N. Whitehead

Philosophical work
- Era: 20th-century philosophy
- Region: Western philosophy
- School: Analytic philosophy Other schools: Foundationalism; Indirect realism; Logicism
- Institutions: Trinity College, Cambridge; London School of Economics; Harvard University; University of Chicago; University of California, Los Angeles
- Notable students: Irving Copi; Raphael Demos; Walter Pitts; Ludwig Wittgenstein
- Main interests: Epistemology; ethics; logic; mathematics; metaphysics; history of philosophy
- Notable ideas: See list: Analytic philosophy; Automated reasoning; Automated theorem proving; Axiom of reducibility; Barber paradox; Berry paradox; Chicken; Connective; Criticism of the coherence theory of truth; Criticism of the doctrine of internal relations/logical holism; Definite description; Descriptivist theory of names; Direct reference theory; Double negation; Epistemic structural realism; Existential fallacy; Failure of reference; Knowledge by acquaintance and knowledge by description; Logical atomism (atomic proposition); Logical form; Mathematical beauty; Mathematical logic; Meaning; Metamathematics; Philosophical logic; Predicativism; Propositional analysis; Propositional calculus; Naive set theory; Neutral monism; Paradoxes of set theory; Peano–Russell notation; Propositional formula; Self-refuting idea; Quantification; Russell–Myhill paradox; Russell's conjugation; Russell-style universes; Russell's paradox; Russell's teapot; Russell's theory of causal lines; Russellian change; Russellian propositions; Russellian view (Russell's critique of Meinong's theory of objects); Set-theoretic definition of natural numbers; Singleton; Theory of descriptions; Theory of relations; Type theory / ramified type theory; Tensor product of graphs; Unity of the proposition

Member of the House of Lords
- Lord Temporal
- Hereditary peerage 4 March 1931 – 2 February 1970
- Preceded by: Frank Russell, 2nd Earl Russell
- Succeeded by: John Russell, 4th Earl Russell

Bertrand Arthur William Russell, 3rd Earl Russell (18 May 1872 – 2 February 1970), was an English mathematician, philosopher, and social critic.

A grandson of John Russell, 1st Earl Russell, a former prime minister of the United Kingdom, Russell was orphaned at the age of four and raised primarily by his grandmother Frances. He won a scholarship to Trinity College, Cambridge, where he studied mathematics and graduated with a first-class degree in 1893. Russell was initially an adherent of British idealism, the dominant philosophy of the time. His friendship with G. E. Moore, a professor of philosophy at Cambridge, led him to analytic philosophy. In Moore and Russell's "revolt against idealism", he rejected dialectic, monism, and idealism and championed logical analysis and pluralism.

Russell was one of the early 20th century's prominent logicians and a founder of analytic philosophy, along with his predecessor Gottlob Frege, his friend and colleague G. E. Moore, and his student and protégé Ludwig Wittgenstein. Russell with Moore led the British "revolt against idealism". (Note: Russell and G. E. Moore broke themselves free from British Idealism which, for nearly 90 years, had been dominating British philosophy. Russell would later recall that "with a sense of escaping from prison, we allowed ourselves to think that grass is green, that the sun and stars would exist if no one was aware of them ...") Together with his former teacher Alfred North Whitehead, Russell wrote Principia Mathematica, a milestone in the development of classical logic and a major attempt to reduce the whole of mathematics to logic (see logicism). Russell's article "On Denoting" has been considered a "paradigm of philosophy".

Russell was a pacifist who championed anti-imperialism and chaired the England-based India League. He went to prison for his pacifism during the First World War, and he initially supported appeasing Adolf Hitler's Nazi Germany, before changing his view in 1943, describing war as a necessary "lesser of two evils". In the wake of the Second World War, he welcomed American global hegemony in preference to either Soviet hegemony or no (or ineffective) world leadership, even if it were to come at the cost of using their nuclear weapons. He later criticised Stalinist totalitarianism, condemned the United States' involvement in the Vietnam War, and became an outspoken proponent of nuclear disarmament.

In 1950, Russell was awarded the Nobel Prize in Literature "in recognition of his varied and significant writings in which he champions humanitarian ideals and freedom of thought". He was also the recipient of the De Morgan Medal (1932), Sylvester Medal (1934), Kalinga Prize (1957), and Jerusalem Prize (1963).

== Biography ==
=== Early life and background ===
Bertrand Arthur William Russell was born at Ravenscroft, a country house in Trellech, Monmouthshire, on 18 May 1872, into an influential and liberal family of the British aristocracy. His parents were John Russell, Viscount Amberley and Katharine Russell, Viscountess Amberley. Both were early advocates of birth control at a time when this was considered scandalous. Lord Amberley consented to his wife's relationship with their children's tutor, the biologist Douglas Spalding. Lord Amberley, a deist, asked the philosopher John Stuart Mill to act as Russell's secular godfather. Mill died the year after Russell's birth, but his writings later influenced Russell's life.

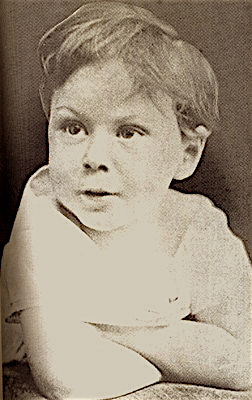
Russell as a 4-year-old

Russell's paternal grandfather, John Russell, 1st Earl Russell, had twice been Prime Minister of the United Kingdom in the 1840s and 1860s. A member of Parliament since the early 1810s, he met Napoleon in Elba. The Russells had been prominent in England for several centuries before this, coming to power and the peerage with the rise of the Tudor dynasty (see: Duke of Bedford). They established themselves as one of the leading Whig families and participated in political events from the dissolution of the monasteries in 1536–1540 to the Glorious Revolution in 1688–1689 and the Great Reform Act in 1832.

Lady Amberley was a daughter of Edward Stanley, 2nd Baron Stanley of Alderley and Henrietta Stanley, Baroness Stanley of Alderley. Russell often feared the ridicule of his maternal grandmother, one of the campaigners for education of women.

=== Childhood and adolescence ===
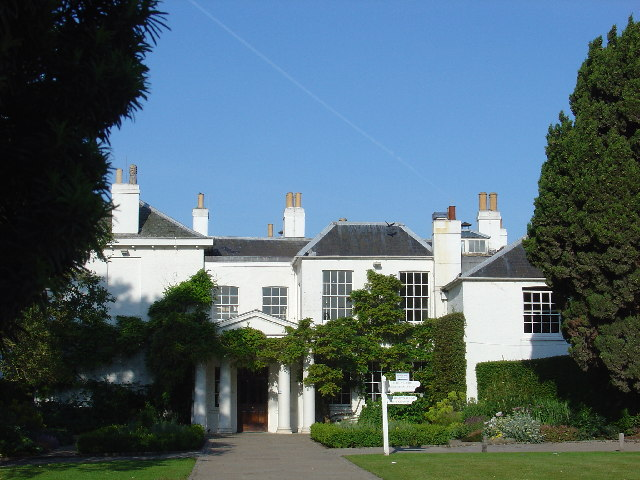
Childhood home, Pembroke Lodge, Richmond Park, London

Russell had two siblings: brother Frank (seven years older), and sister Rachel (four years older). In June 1874 Russell's mother died of diphtheria, followed shortly by Rachel's death. In January 1876, his father died of bronchitis after a long period of depression. Frank and Bertrand were placed in the care of paternal grandparents, who lived at Pembroke Lodge in Richmond Park. His grandfather, former Prime Minister Earl Russell, died in 1878, and was remembered by Russell as a kind old man in a wheelchair. His grandmother, the Countess Russell (née Lady Frances Elliot), was the central family figure for the rest of Russell's childhood and youth. The Countess was from a Scottish Presbyterian family and petitioned the Court of Chancery to set aside a provision in Amberley's will requiring the children to be raised as agnostics. Despite her religious conservatism, she held progressive views in other areas (accepting Darwinism and supporting Irish Home Rule), and her influence on Bertrand Russell's outlook on social justice and standing up for principle remained with him throughout his life.

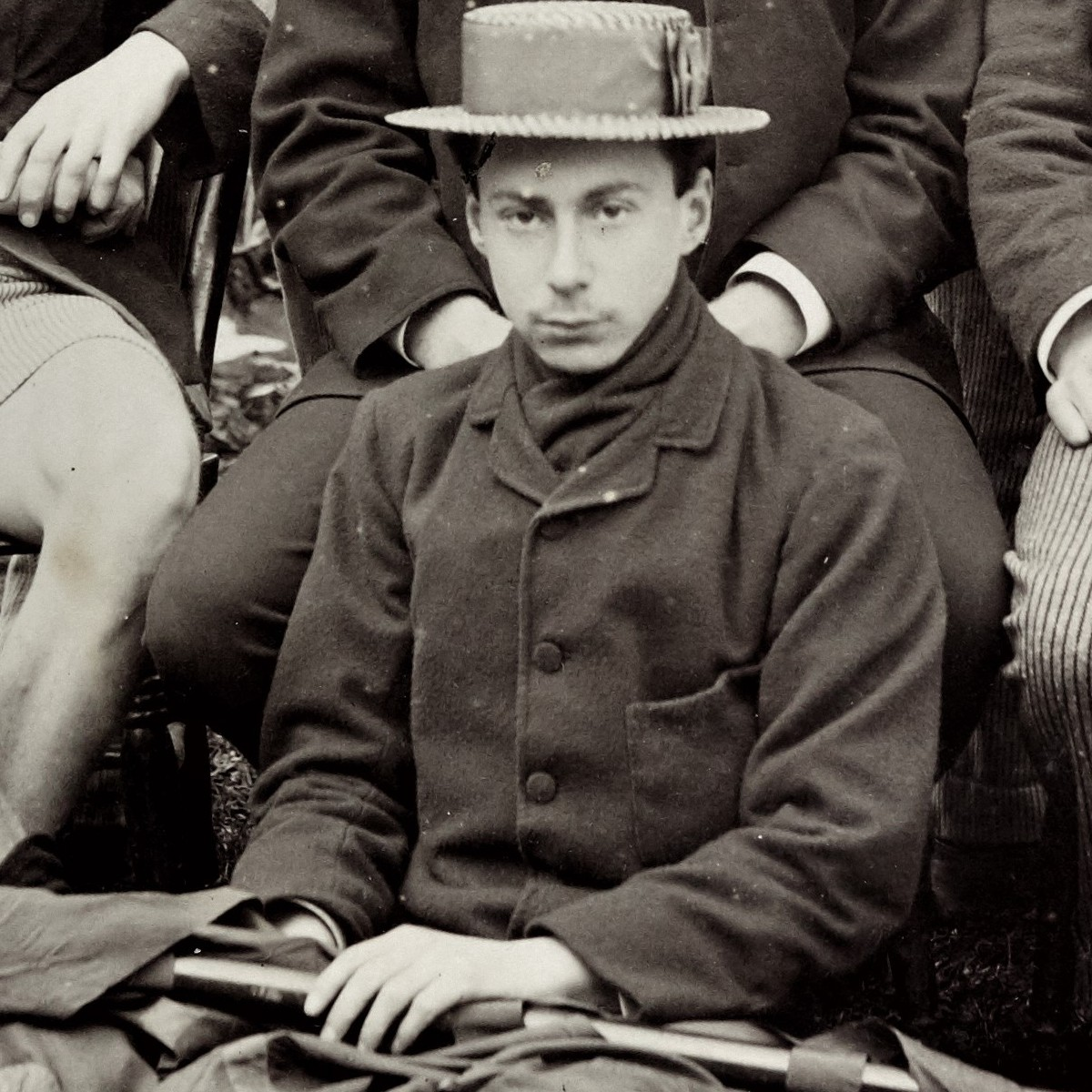
Russell at Trinity College, Cambridge, in 1891

Russell's adolescence was lonely and he contemplated suicide. He remarked in his autobiography that his interests in "nature and books and (later) mathematics saved me from complete despondency;" only his wish to know more mathematics kept him from suicide. He was educated at home by a series of tutors. When Russell was eleven, his brother Frank introduced him to the work of Euclid, which he described in his autobiography as "one of the great events of my life, as dazzling as first love".

During these formative years, he also discovered the works of Percy Bysshe Shelley. Russell wrote: "I spent all my spare time reading him, and learning him by heart, knowing no one to whom I could speak of what I thought or felt, I used to reflect how wonderful it would have been to know Shelley, and to wonder whether I should meet any live human being with whom I should feel so much sympathy." Russell said that beginning at age 15, he spent considerable time thinking about the validity of Christian religious dogma, which he found unconvincing. At this age, he came to the conclusion that there is no free will and, two years later, that there is no life after death. Finally, at the age of 18, after reading Mill's Autobiography, he abandoned the "First Cause" argument and became an atheist.

He travelled to the continent in 1890 with an American friend, Edward FitzGerald, and with FitzGerald's family he visited the Paris Exhibition of 1889 and climbed the Eiffel Tower soon after it was completed.

=== Education ===
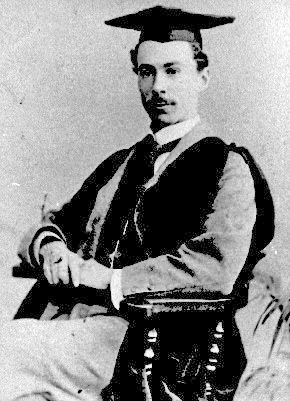
Russell at Trinity College, Cambridge, in 1893

Russell won a scholarship to read for the Mathematical Tripos at Trinity College, Cambridge, and began his studies there in 1890, taking as coach Robert Rumsey Webb. He became acquainted with the younger George Edward Moore and came under the influence of Alfred North Whitehead, who recommended him to the Cambridge Apostles. He distinguished himself in mathematics and philosophy, graduating as seventh Wrangler in the former in 1893 and becoming a Fellow in the latter in 1895. During his time at Cambridge, Russell increasingly turned from mathematics toward philosophy, influenced by contemporary debates about idealism and the foundations of geometry. Although initially sympathetic to British Idealism, he later rejected it, developing the realist approach that would become central to analytic philosophy. His early academic work focused on the logical foundations of mathematics, culminating in his first major publication, An Essay on the Foundations of Geometry (1897).

Russell's election to a Fellowship at Trinity College in 1895 provided him with financial independence and the freedom to pursue research. During these formative years, he began the investigations into logic and set theory that would eventually lead to his work on logicism and his collaboration with Alfred North Whitehead on Principia Mathematica.

=== Early career ===
Russell began his published work in 1896 with German Social Democracy, a study in politics that was an early indication of his interest in political and social theory. In 1896 he taught German social democracy at the London School of Economics. He was a member of the Coefficients dining club of social reformers set up in 1902 by the Fabian campaigners Sidney and Beatrice Webb.

He now started a study of the foundations of mathematics at Trinity. In 1897, he wrote An Essay on the Foundations of Geometry (submitted at the Fellowship Examination of Trinity College) which discussed the Cayley–Klein metrics used for non-Euclidean geometry. He attended the first International Congress of Philosophy in Paris in 1900 where he met Giuseppe Peano and Alessandro Padoa. The Italians had responded to Georg Cantor, making a science of set theory; they gave Russell their literature including the Formulario mathematico. Russell was impressed by the precision of Peano's arguments at the Congress, read the literature upon returning to England, and came upon Russell's paradox. In 1903 he published The Principles of Mathematics, a work on the foundations of mathematics. It advanced a thesis of logicism, that mathematics and logic are one and the same.

In February 1901, at the age of 29, Russell underwent what he called a "sort of mystic illumination", after witnessing Whitehead's wife's suffering in an angina attack. "I found myself filled with semi-mystical feelings about beauty and with a desire almost as profound as that of the Buddha to find some philosophy which should make human life endurable", Russell would later recall. "At the end of those five minutes, I had become a completely different person."

In 1905, he wrote the essay "On Denoting", which was published in the philosophical journal Mind. Russell was elected a Fellow of the Royal Society (FRS) in 1908. The three-volume Principia Mathematica, written with Whitehead, was published between 1910 and 1913. This, along with the earlier The Principles of Mathematics, soon made Russell world-famous in his field. Russell's first political activity was as the Independent Liberal candidate in the 1907 by-election for the Wimbledon constituency, where he was not elected.

In 1910, he became a lecturer at the University of Cambridge, Trinity College, where he had studied. He was considered for a fellowship, which would give him a vote in the college government and protect him from being fired for his opinions, but was passed over because he was "anti-clerical", because he was agnostic. He was approached by the Austrian engineering student Ludwig Wittgenstein, who started undergraduate study with him. Russell viewed Wittgenstein as a successor who would continue his work on logic. He spent hours dealing with Wittgenstein's various phobias and his bouts of despair. This was a drain on Russell's energy, but Russell continued to be fascinated by him and encouraged his academic development, including the publication of Wittgenstein's Tractatus Logico-Philosophicus in 1922. Russell delivered his lectures on logical atomism, his version of these ideas, in 1918, before the end of World War I.

=== First World War ===
Russell served on the National Committee of the No-Conscription Fellowship, shown here in May 1916 (back right).

During World War I, Russell was one of the few people to engage in active pacifist activities. In 1916, due to his absence of allegiance to the war effort, he was dismissed from Trinity College following his conviction under the Defence of the Realm Act 1914. He later described this, in Free Thought and Official Propaganda, as an illegitimate means the state used to violate freedom of expression. Russell championed the case of Eric Chappelow, a poet jailed and abused as a conscientious objector. Russell played a part in the Leeds Convention in June 1917, a historic event which saw well over a thousand "anti-war socialists" gather; many being delegates from the Independent Labour Party and the British Socialist Party, united in their pacifist beliefs and advocating a peace settlement. The international press reported that Russell appeared with a number of Labour Members of Parliament (MPs), including Ramsay MacDonald and Philip Snowden, as well as former Liberal MP and anti-conscription campaigner, Professor Arnold Lupton. After the event, Russell told Lady Ottoline Morrell that, "to my surprise, when I got up to speak, I was given the greatest ovation that was possible to give anybody".

Russell's conviction in 1916 resulted in his being fined £100 (equivalent to £6,000 in 2025), which he refused to pay in the hope that he would be sent to prison, but his books were sold at auction to raise the money. The books were bought by friends; he later treasured his copy of the King James Bible that was stamped "Confiscated by Cambridge Police".

A later conviction for publicly lecturing against inviting the United States to enter the war on the United Kingdom's side resulted in six months' imprisonment in Brixton Prison (see Bertrand Russell's political views) in 1918 (he was prosecuted under the Defence of the Realm Act). He later said of his imprisonment:

I found prison in many ways quite agreeable. I had no engagements, no difficult decisions to make, no fear of callers, no interruptions to my work. I read enormously; I wrote a book, "Introduction to Mathematical Philosophy" ... and began the work for "The Analysis of Mind". I was rather interested in my fellow-prisoners, who seemed to me in no way morally inferior to the rest of the population, though they were on the whole slightly below the usual level of intelligence as was shown by their having been caught.

While he was reading Strachey's Eminent Victorians chapter about Gordon he laughed out loud in his cell prompting the warder to intervene and reminding him that "prison was a place of punishment".

Russell was reinstated to Trinity in 1919, resigned in 1920, was Tarner Lecturer in 1926 and became a Fellow again in 1944 until 1949.

In 1924, Russell again gained press attention when attending a "banquet" in the House of Commons with well-known campaigners, including Arnold Lupton, who had been an MP and had also endured imprisonment for "passive resistance to military or naval service".

=== G. H. Hardy on the Trinity controversy ===
In 1941, G. H. Hardy wrote a 61-page pamphlet titled Bertrand Russell and Trinity (published later as a book by Cambridge University Press with a foreword by C. D. Broad) in which he gave an authoritative account of Russell's 1916 dismissal from Trinity College, explaining that a reconciliation between the college and Russell had later taken place and gave details about Russell's personal life. Hardy writes that Russell's dismissal had created a scandal since the vast majority of the Fellows of the College opposed the decision. The ensuing pressure from the Fellows induced the Council to reinstate Russell. In January 1920, it was announced that Russell had accepted the reinstatement offer from Trinity and would begin lecturing in October. In July 1920, Russell applied for a one-year leave of absence; this was approved. He spent the year giving lectures in China and Japan. In January 1921, it was announced by Trinity that Russell had resigned and his resignation had been accepted. This resignation, Hardy explains, was voluntary and was not the result of another altercation.

The reason for the resignation, according to Hardy, was that Russell was going through a tumultuous time in his personal life with a divorce and subsequent remarriage. Russell contemplated asking Trinity for another one-year leave of absence but decided against it since this would have been an "unusual application" and the situation had the potential to snowball into another controversy. Although Russell did the right thing, in Hardy's opinion, the reputation of the College suffered with Russell's resignation since the 'world of learning' knew about Russell's altercation with Trinity but not that the rift had healed. In 1925, Russell was asked by the Council of Trinity College to give the Tarner Lectures on the Philosophy of the Sciences; these would later be the basis for one of Russell's best-received books according to Hardy: The Analysis of Matter, published in 1927. In the preface to the Trinity pamphlet, Hardy wrote:

I wish to make it plain that Russell himself is not responsible, directly or indirectly, for the writing of the pamphlet.... I wrote it without his knowledge and, when I sent him the typescript and asked for his permission to print it, I suggested that, unless it contained misstatement of fact, he should make no comment on it. He agreed to this... no word has been changed as the result of any suggestion from him.

=== Between the wars ===
In August 1920, Russell travelled to Soviet Russia as part of an official delegation sent by the British government to investigate the effects of the Russian Revolution. He wrote a four-part series of articles, titled "Soviet Russia—1920", for the magazine The Nation. He met Vladimir Lenin and had an hour-long conversation with him. In his autobiography, he mentions that he found Lenin disappointing, sensing an "impish cruelty" in him and comparing him to "an opinionated professor". He cruised down the Volga on a steamship. His experiences destroyed his previous tentative support for the revolution. He subsequently wrote a book, The Practice and Theory of Bolshevism, about his experiences on this trip,

The Russian authorities only admitted me on the express condition that I should travel with the British Labour Delegation ... I, not being a member of the Delegation, felt less obligation than my companions did to attend at propaganda meetings where one knew the speeches by heart beforehand. In this way, I was able, by the help of neutral interpreters, mostly English or American, to have many conversations with casual people whom I met in the streets or on village greens, and to find out how the whole system appears to the ordinary non-political man and woman.

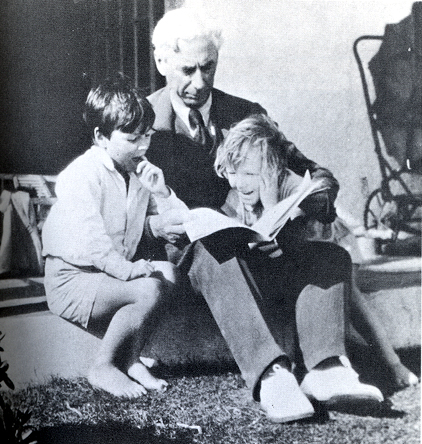
Russell with his children, John and Kate

Russell's lover Dora Black, a British author, feminist and socialist campaigner, visited Soviet Russia independently at the same time; in contrast to his reaction, she was enthusiastic about the Bolshevik revolution.

The following year, Russell, accompanied by Dora, visited Peking (Beijing) to lecture on philosophy for a year. He went with optimism and hope, seeing China as then being on a new path. Other scholars present in China at the time included John Dewey and Rabindranath Tagore, the Indian Nobel-laureate poet. Before leaving China, Russell became gravely ill with pneumonia, and incorrect reports of his death were published in the Japanese press. When the couple visited Japan on their return journey, Dora took on the role of spurning the local press by handing out notices reading "Mr. Bertrand Russell, having died according to the Japanese press, is unable to give interviews to Japanese journalists". Apparently they found this harsh and reacted resentfully. Russell supported his family during this time by writing popular books explaining matters of physics, ethics, and education to the layman.

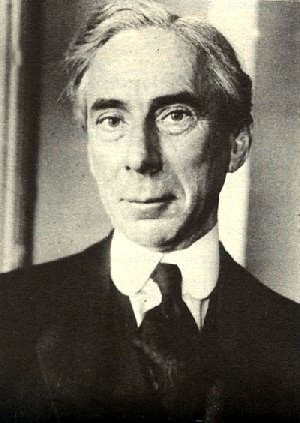
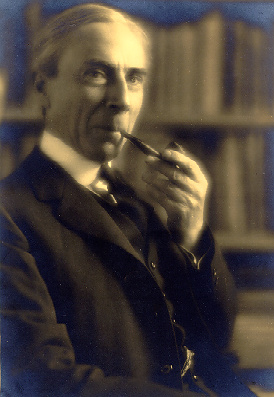
Bertrand Russell in 1924

From 1922 to 1927, the Russells divided their time between London and Cornwall, spending summers in Porthcurno. In the 1922 and 1923 general elections Russell stood as a Labour Party candidate in the Chelsea constituency, but only on the basis that he knew he was unlikely to be elected in such a safe Conservative seat, and he was unsuccessful on both occasions.

After the birth of his two children, he became interested in education, especially early childhood education. He was not satisfied with the old traditional education and thought that progressive education also had some flaws; as a result, together with Dora, Russell founded the experimental Beacon Hill School in 1927. The school was run from a succession of different locations, including its original premises at the Russells' residence, Telegraph House, near Harting, West Sussex. During this time, he published On Education, Especially in Early Childhood. On 8 July 1930, Dora gave birth to her third child Harriet Ruth. After he left the school in 1932, Dora continued it until 1943.

In 1927, Russell met Barry Fox (later Barry Stevens), who became a known Gestalt therapist and writer in her later years. They developed an intense relationship, and in Fox's words: "... for three years we were very close." Fox sent her daughter Judith to Beacon Hill School. From 1927 to 1932 Russell wrote 34 letters to Fox. Upon the death of his elder brother Frank, in 1931, Russell became the 3rd Earl Russell.

Russell's marriage to Dora grew tenuous, and it reached a breaking point over her having two children with an American journalist, Griffin Barry. They separated in 1932 and finally divorced. On 18 January 1936, Russell married his third wife, an Oxford undergraduate named Patricia ("Peter") Spence, who had been his children's governess since 1930. Russell and Peter had one son, Conrad Sebastian Robert Russell, 5th Earl Russell, who became a historian and one of the leading figures in the Liberal Democrat party.

In 1937, Russell returned to the London School of Economics to lecture on the science of power. During the 1930s, Russell became a friend and collaborator of V. K. Krishna Menon, then President of the India League, the foremost lobby in the United Kingdom for Indian independence. Russell chaired the India League from 1932 to 1939.

=== Second World War ===
Russell's political views changed over time, mostly about war. He opposed rearmament against Nazi Germany. In 1937, he wrote in a personal letter: "If the Germans succeed in sending an invading army to England we should do best to treat them as visitors, give them quarters and invite the commander and chief to dine with the prime minister." In 1940, he changed his appeasement view that avoiding a full-scale world war was more important than defeating Hitler. He concluded that Adolf Hitler taking over all of Europe would be a permanent threat to democracy. In 1943, he adopted a stance toward large-scale warfare called "relative political pacifism": "War was always a great evil, but in some particularly extreme circumstances, it may be the lesser of two evils."

Before World War II, Russell taught at the University of Chicago, later moving on to Los Angeles to lecture at the UCLA Department of Philosophy. He was appointed professor at the City College of New York (CCNY) in 1940, but after a public outcry the appointment was annulled by a court judgment that pronounced him "morally unfit" to teach at the college because of his opinions, especially those relating to sexual morality, detailed in Marriage and Morals (1929). The matter was taken to the New York Supreme Court by Jean Kay who was afraid that her daughter would be harmed by the appointment, though her daughter was not a student at CCNY. Many intellectuals, led by John Dewey, protested at his treatment. Albert Einstein's oft-quoted aphorism that "great spirits have always encountered violent opposition from mediocre minds" originated in his open letter, dated 19 March 1940, to Morris Raphael Cohen, a professor emeritus at CCNY, supporting Russell's appointment. Dewey and Horace M. Kallen edited a collection of articles on the CCNY affair in The Bertrand Russell Case. Russell soon joined the Barnes Foundation, lecturing to a varied audience on the history of philosophy; these lectures formed the basis of A History of Western Philosophy. His relationship with the eccentric Albert C. Barnes soon soured, and he returned to the UK in 1944 to rejoin the faculty of Trinity College.

=== Later life ===
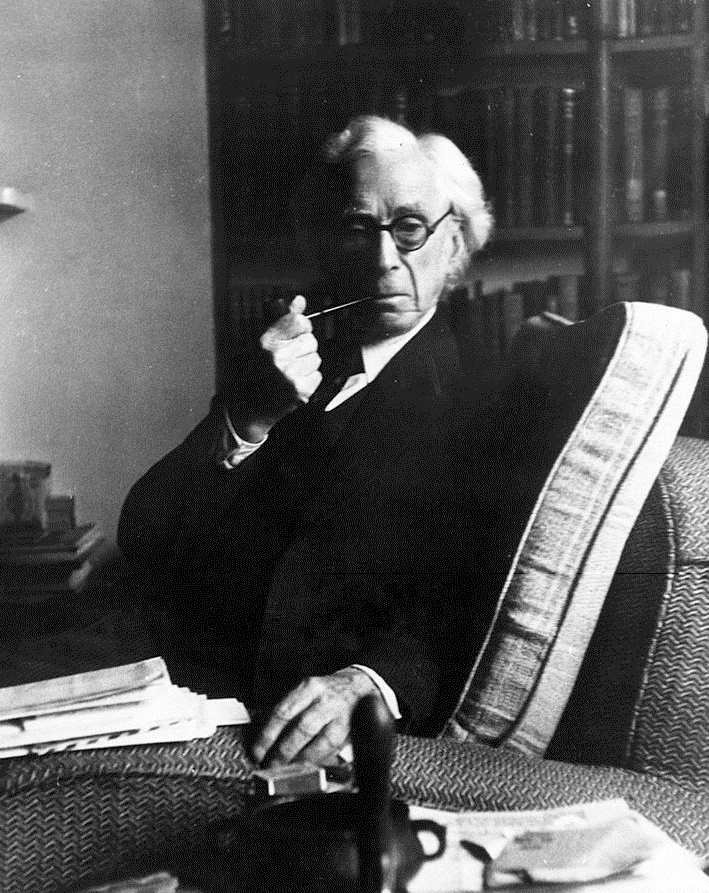
Russell in 1954

Russell participated in many broadcasts over the BBC, particularly The Brains Trust and for the Third Programme, on various topical and philosophical subjects. By this time Russell was known outside academic circles, frequently the subject or author of magazine and newspaper articles, and was called upon to offer opinions on a variety of subjects, even mundane ones. En route to one of his lectures in Trondheim, Russell was one of 24 survivors (out of 43 passengers) of an aeroplane crash in Hommelvik in October 1948. He said he owed his life to smoking since the people who drowned were in the non-smoking part of the plane. A History of Western Philosophy (1945) became a best-seller and provided Russell with a steady income for the remainder of his life.

In 1942, Russell argued in favour of a moderate socialism, capable of overcoming its metaphysical principles. In an inquiry on dialectical materialism, launched by the Austrian artist and philosopher Wolfgang Paalen in his journal DYN, Russell said: "I think the metaphysics of both Hegel and Marx plain nonsense—Marx's claim to be 'science' is no more justified than Mary Baker Eddy's. This does not mean that I am opposed to socialism."

In 1943, Russell expressed support for Zionism: "I have come gradually to see that, in a dangerous and largely hostile world, it is essential to Jews to have some country which is theirs, some region where they are not suspected aliens, some state which embodies what is distinctive in their culture".

In a speech in 1948, Russell said that if the USSR's aggression continued, it would be morally worse to go to war after the USSR possessed an atomic bomb than before it possessed one, because if the USSR had no bomb the West's victory would come more swiftly and with fewer casualties than if there were atomic bombs on both sides. At that time, only the United States possessed an atomic bomb, and the USSR was pursuing an aggressive policy towards the countries in Eastern Europe which were being absorbed into the Soviet Union's sphere of influence. Many understood Russell's comments to mean that Russell approved of a first strike in a war with the USSR, including Nigel Lawson, who was present when Russell spoke of such matters. Others, including Griffin, who obtained a transcript of the speech, have argued that he was explaining the usefulness of America's atomic arsenal in deterring the USSR from continuing its domination of Eastern Europe.

Just after the atomic bombs exploded over Hiroshima and Nagasaki, Russell wrote letters, and published articles in newspapers from 1945 to 1948, stating clearly that it was morally justified and better to go to war against the USSR using atomic bombs while the United States possessed them and before the USSR did. In September 1949, one week after the USSR tested its first A-bomb, but before this became known, Russell wrote that the USSR would be unable to develop nuclear weapons because following Stalin's purges only science based on Marxist principles would be practised in the Soviet Union. After it became known that the USSR had carried out its nuclear bomb tests, Russell declared his position advocating the total abolition of atomic weapons.

In 1948, Russell was invited by the BBC to deliver the inaugural Reith Lectures—what was to become an annual series of lectures, still broadcast by the BBC. His series of six broadcasts, titled Authority and the Individual, explored themes such as the role of individual initiative in the development of a community and the role of state control in a progressive society. Russell continued to write about philosophy. He wrote a foreword to Words and Things by Ernest Gellner, which was highly critical of the later thought of Ludwig Wittgenstein and of ordinary language philosophy. Gilbert Ryle refused to have the book reviewed in the philosophical journal Mind, which caused Russell to respond via The Times. The result was a month-long correspondence in The Times between the supporters and detractors of ordinary language philosophy, which was ended when the paper published an editorial critical of both sides but agreeing with the opponents of ordinary language philosophy.

In the King's Birthday Honours of 9 June 1949, Russell was awarded the Order of Merit, and the following year he was awarded the Nobel Prize in Literature. When he was given the Order of Merit, George VI was affable but embarrassed at decorating a former jailbird, saying, "You have sometimes behaved in a manner that would not do if generally adopted". Russell merely smiled, but afterwards claimed that the reply "That's right, just like your brother" immediately came to mind.

In 1950, Russell attended the inaugural conference for the Congress for Cultural Freedom, a CIA-funded anti-communist organisation committed to the deployment of culture as a weapon during the Cold War. Russell was one of the known patrons of the Congress until he resigned in 1956.

In 1952, Russell was divorced by Spence, with whom he had been very unhappy. Conrad, Russell's son by Spence, did not see his father between the time of the divorce and 1968 (at which time his decision to meet his father caused a permanent breach with his mother). Russell married his fourth wife, Edith Finch, soon after the divorce, on 15 December 1952. They had known each other since 1925, and Edith had taught English at Bryn Mawr College near Philadelphia, sharing a house for 20 years with Russell's old friend Lucy Donnelly. Edith remained with him until his death, and, by all accounts, their marriage was a happy, close, and loving one. Russell's eldest son John suffered from mental illness, which was the source of ongoing disputes between Russell and his former wife Dora.

In 1962 Russell played a public role in the Cuban Missile Crisis: in an exchange of telegrams with Soviet leader Nikita Khrushchev, Khrushchev assured him that the Soviet government would not be reckless. Russell sent this telegram to President Kennedy:

YOUR ACTION DESPERATE. THREAT TO HUMAN SURVIVAL. NO CONCEIVABLE JUSTIFICATION. CIVILIZED MAN CONDEMNS IT. WE WILL NOT HAVE MASS MURDER. ULTIMATUM MEANS WAR... END THIS MADNESS.

According to historian Peter Knight, after JFK's assassination, Russell, "prompted by the emerging work of the lawyer Mark Lane in the US ... rallied support from other noteworthy and left-leaning compatriots to form a 'Who Killed Kennedy committee' in June 1964, members of which included Michael Foot MP, Caroline Benn (wife of Tony Benn MP), the publisher Victor Gollancz, the writers John Arden and J. B. Priestley, and the Oxford history professor Hugh Trevor-Roper." Russell published a highly critical article in The Minority of One weeks before the Warren Commission report was published, setting forth 16 Questions on the Assassination. He equated the Oswald case with the Dreyfus affair of late 19th-century France, in which the state convicted an innocent man. He also criticised the American press for failing to heed any voices critical of the official version.

=== Final years and death ===
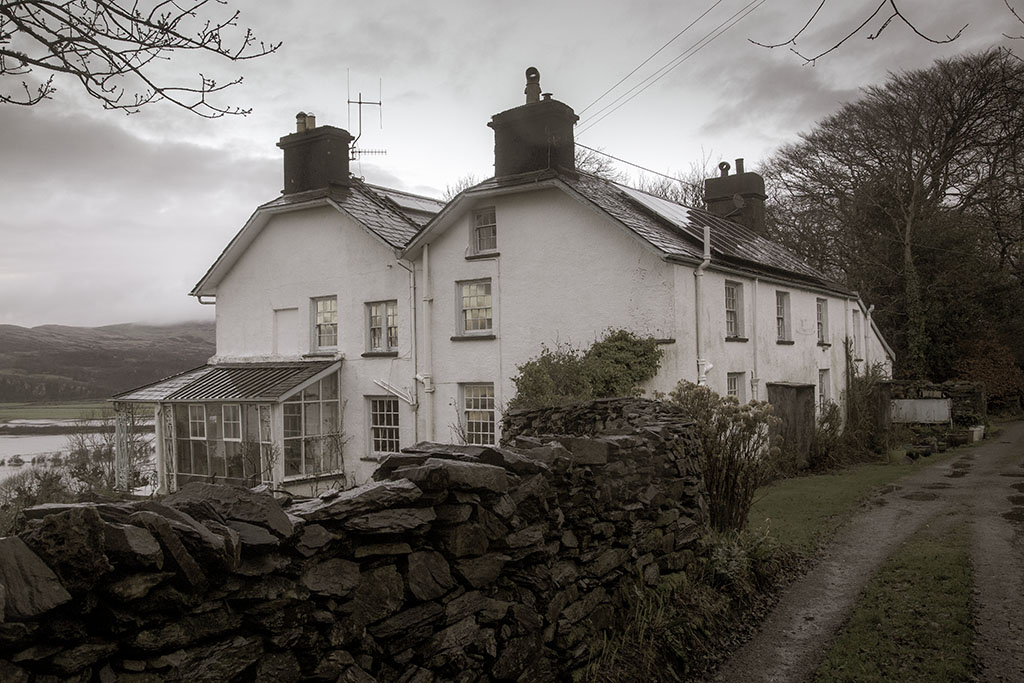
Plas Penrhyn in Penrhyndeudraeth

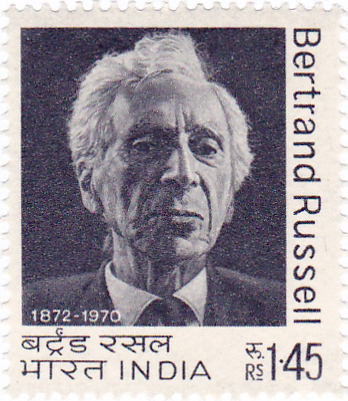
Russell on a 1972 stamp of India

In June 1955, Russell had leased Plas Penrhyn in Penrhyndeudraeth, Merionethshire, Wales and on 5 July of the following year it became his and Edith's principal residence.

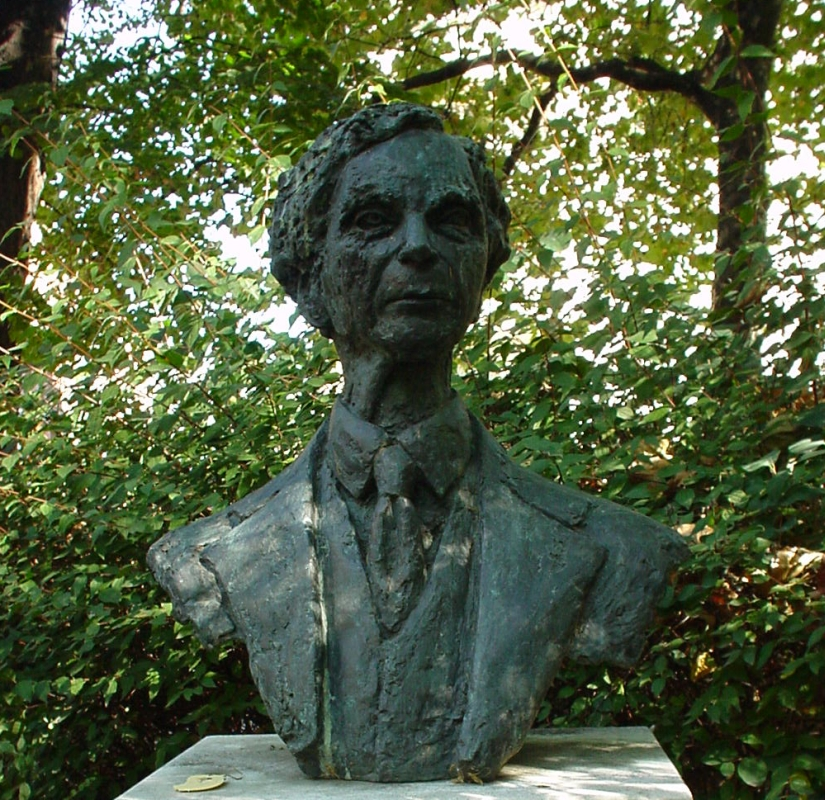
Bust of Russell in Red Lion Square

Russell published his three-volume autobiography in 1967, 1968, and 1969. He made a cameo appearance playing himself in the anti-war Hindi film Aman, by Mohan Kumar, which was released in India in 1967. This was Russell's only appearance in a feature film.

On 23 November 1969, he wrote to The Times newspaper saying that the preparation for show trials in Czechoslovakia was "highly alarming". The same month, he appealed to Secretary General U Thant of the United Nations to support an international war crimes commission to investigate alleged torture and genocide by the United States in South Vietnam during the Vietnam War. The following month, he protested to Alexei Kosygin over the expulsion of Aleksandr Solzhenitsyn from the Soviet Union of Writers.

On 31 January 1970, Russell issued a statement condemning "Israel's aggression in the Middle East", and in particular, Israeli bombing raids being carried out deep in Egyptian territory as part of the War of Attrition, which he compared to German bombing raids in the Battle of Britain and the US bombing of Vietnam. He called for an Israeli withdrawal to the pre-Six-Day War borders, stating "The aggression committed by Israel must be condemned, not only because no state has the right to annexe foreign territory, but because every expansion is an experiment to discover how much more aggression the world will tolerate." This was Russell's final political statement or act. It was read out at the International Conference of Parliamentarians in Cairo on 3 February 1970, the day after his death.

Russell died of influenza, just after 8 pm on 2 February 1970 at his home in Penrhyndeudraeth, aged 97. His body was cremated in Colwyn Bay on 5 February 1970 with five people present. In accordance with his will, there was no religious ceremony but one minute's silence; his ashes were later scattered over the Welsh mountains. Although he was born in Monmouthshire, and died in Penrhyndeudraeth in Wales, Russell identified as English. Later in 1970, on 23 October, his will was published showing he had left an estate valued at £69,423 (equivalent to £1 million in 2025).

== Philosophy ==
Russell is credited with being one of the founders of analytic philosophy. He was impressed by Gottfried Leibniz (1646–1716), and wrote on major areas of philosophy except aesthetics. He was prolific in the fields of metaphysics, logic and the philosophy of mathematics, the philosophy of language, ethics and epistemology. When Brand Blanshard asked Russell why he did not write on aesthetics, Russell replied that he did not know anything about it, though he hastened to add "but that is not a very good excuse, for my friends tell me it has not deterred me from writing on other subjects".

=== Analytic philosophy ===
Bertrand Russell helped to develop what is now called "Analytic Philosophy." Alongside G. E. Moore, Russell was responsible for the British revolt against idealism, a philosophy greatly influenced by G. W. F. Hegel and his British apostle, F. H. Bradley. This revolt was echoed 30 years later in Vienna by the logical positivists' "revolt against metaphysics." Russell was particularly critical of a doctrine he ascribed to idealism and coherentism, which he dubbed the doctrine of internal relations; this, Russell suggested, held that to know any particular thing, we must know all of its relations. Russell argued that this would make space, time, science and the concept of number not fully intelligible. Russell's logical work with Whitehead continued this project.

Russell and Moore were devoted to clarity in arguments by breaking down philosophical positions into their simplest components. Russell, in particular, saw formal logic and science as the principal tools of the philosopher. Russell did not think we should have separate methods for philosophy. Russell thought philosophers should strive to answer the most general of propositions about the world and this would help eliminate confusions. In particular, he wanted to end what he saw as the excesses of metaphysics. Russell adopted William of Ockham's principle against multiplying unnecessary entities, Occam's razor, as a central part of the method of analysis.

=== Logic and philosophy of mathematics ===
Russell had great influence on modern mathematical logic. The American philosopher and logician Willard Van Orman Quine said Russell's work represented the greatest influence on his own work.

Russell's first mathematical book, An Essay on the Foundations of Geometry, was published in 1897. This work was heavily influenced by Immanuel Kant. The book was highly praised but according to the author "far more in fact than it deserved". Russell later realised that the conception it laid out would make Albert Einstein's schema of space-time impossible. Thenceforth, he rejected the entire Kantian program as it related to mathematics and geometry, and rejected his own earliest work on the subject.

Interested in the definition of number, Russell studied the work of George Boole, Georg Cantor, and Augustus De Morgan. Materials in the Bertrand Russell Archives at McMaster University include notes of his reading in algebraic logic by Charles Sanders Peirce and Ernst Schröder. In 1900 he attended the first International Congress of Philosophy in Paris, where he became familiar with the work of the Italian mathematician, Giuseppe Peano. He mastered Peano's new symbolism and his set of axioms for arithmetic. Peano defined logically all of the terms of these axioms with the exception of 0, number, successor, and the singular term, the, which were the primitives of his system. Russell took it upon himself to find logical definitions for each of these. Between 1897 and 1903 he published several articles applying Peano's notation to the classical Boole-Schröder algebra of relations, among them On the Notion of Order, Sur la logique des relations avec les applications à la théorie des séries, and On Cardinal Numbers. He became convinced that the foundations of mathematics could be derived within what has since come to be called higher-order logic which in turn he believed to include some form of unrestricted comprehension axiom.

Russell then discovered that Gottlob Frege had independently arrived at equivalent definitions for 0, successor, and number, and the definition of number is now usually referred to as the Frege-Russell definition. Russell drew attention to Frege's priority in 1903, when he published The Principles of Mathematics (see below). The appendix to this work, however, described a paradox arising from Frege's application of second- and higher-order functions which took first-order functions as their arguments, and Russell offered his first effort to resolve what would henceforth come to be known as the Russell paradox. Before writing Principles, Russell became aware of Cantor's proof that there was no greatest cardinal number, which Russell believed was mistaken. Cantor's paradox in turn was shown (for example by Crossley) to be a special case of the Russell Paradox. This caused Russell to analyse classes, for it was known that given any number of elements, the number of classes they result in is greater than their number. Russell's paradox involves the class of all classes, divided into two kinds: those classes that contain themselves, and those that do not. This class demonstrates a fatal flaw in the so-called principle of comprehension, which had been taken for granted by logicians of the time: it results in a contradiction, whereby Y is a member of Y if and only if Y is not a member of Y. Russell outlined a resolution of this paradox in an appendix to Principles, which he later developed into the theory of types. Aside from exposing a major inconsistency in naive set theory, Russell's work led directly to the creation of modern axiomatic set theory. It also crippled Frege's project of reducing arithmetic to logic. The Theory of Types and much of Russell's subsequent work have also found practical applications in computer science and information technology.

Russell continued to defend logicism, the view that mathematics is in some important sense reducible to logic, and along with his former teacher, Alfred North Whitehead, wrote the monumental Principia Mathematica, an axiomatic system on which all of mathematics can be built. The first volume of the Principia was published in 1910, and is largely ascribed to Russell. More than any other single work, it established the speciality of mathematical or symbolic logic. Two more volumes were published, but their original plan to incorporate geometry in a fourth volume was never realised, and Russell never felt up to improving the original works, though he referenced new developments and problems in his preface to the second edition. Upon completing the Principia, three volumes of extraordinarily abstract and complex reasoning, Russell was exhausted, and he felt his intellectual faculties never fully recovered from the effort. Although the Principia did not fall prey to the paradoxes in Frege's approach, it was later proven by Kurt Gödel that neither Principia Mathematica, nor any other consistent system of primitive recursive arithmetic, could decide the truth of every proposition by a proof or disproof within that system (see: Gödel's incompleteness theorem).

Russell's last significant work in mathematics and logic, Introduction to Mathematical Philosophy, was written while he was in jail for his anti-war activities during World War I. This was largely an explication of his previous work and its philosophical significance.

=== Philosophy of language ===
Russell made language, or more specifically, how we use language, a central part of philosophy, and this influenced Ludwig Wittgenstein, Gilbert Ryle, J. L. Austin, and P. F. Strawson, among others, who used many of the techniques that Russell originally developed. Russell, and G. E. Moore, argued that clarity of expression is a virtue.

A significant contribution to philosophy of language is Russell's theory of descriptions, set out in On Denoting (Mind, 1905). Frank Ramsey described this paper as "a paradigm of philosophy." The theory considers the sentence "The present King of France is bald" and whether the proposition is false or meaningless. Frege had argued, employing his distinction between sense and reference, that such sentences were meaningful but neither true nor false. Russell argues that the grammatical form of the sentence disguises its underlying logical form. Russell's Theory of Definite Descriptions enables the sentence to be construed as meaningful but false, without commitment to the existence of any present King of France. This addresses a paradox of great antiquity (e.g. "That which is not must in some sense be. Otherwise, how could we say of it that it is not?" etc.), going back at least as far as Parmenides. In Russell's own time, Meinong held the view of that-which-is-not being in some sense real; and Russell held this view prior to On Denoting.

The problem is general to what are called "definite descriptions." Normally this includes all terms beginning with "the," and sometimes includes names, like "Walter Scott." (This point is quite contentious: Russell sometimes thought that the latter terms shouldn't be called names at all, but only "disguised definite descriptions," but much subsequent work has treated them as altogether different things.) What is the "logical form" of definite descriptions: how, in Frege's terms, could we paraphrase them to show how the truth of the whole depends on the truths of the parts? Definite descriptions appear to be like names that by their very nature denote exactly one thing, neither more nor less. What, then, are we to say about the proposition as a whole if one of its parts apparently isn't functioning correctly?

Russell's solution was, first of all, to analyse not the term alone but the entire proposition that contained a definite description. "The present king of France is bald," he then suggested, can be reworded to "There is an x such that x is a present king of France, nothing other than x is a present king of France, and x is bald." Russell claimed that each definite description in fact contains a claim of existence and a claim of uniqueness which give this appearance, but these can be broken apart and treated separately from the predication that is the obvious content of the proposition. The proposition as a whole then says three things about some object: the definite description contains two of them, and the rest of the sentence contains the other. If the object does not exist, or if it is not unique, then the whole sentence turns out to be false, not meaningless.

One of the major complaints against Russell's theory, due originally to Strawson, is that definite descriptions do not claim that their object exists, they merely presuppose that it does.

Wittgenstein, Russell's student, achieved considerable prominence in the philosophy of language after the posthumous publication of the Philosophical Investigations. In Russell's opinion, Wittgenstein's later work was misguided, and he decried its influence and that of its followers (especially members of the so-called "Oxford school" of ordinary language philosophy, who he believed were promoting a kind of mysticism). He wrote a foreword to Ernest Gellner's Words and Things which was a fierce attack on the Oxford School of Ordinary Language philosophy and Wittgenstein's later work and was supportive of Gellner in the subsequent academic dispute. However, Russell still held Wittgenstein and his early work in high regard, he thought of him as, "perhaps the most perfect example I have ever known of genius as traditionally conceived, passionate, profound, intense, and dominating." Russell's belief that philosophy's task is not limited to examining ordinary language is once again widely accepted in philosophy.

=== Logical atomism ===
Russell explained his philosophy of logical atomism in a set of lectures, "The Philosophy of Logical Atomism", which he gave in 1918. In these lectures, Russell sets forth his concept of an ideal, isomorphic language, one that would mirror the world, whereby our knowledge can be reduced to terms of atomic propositions and their truth-functional compounds. Logical atomism is a form of radical empiricism, for Russell believed the most important requirement for such an ideal language is that every meaningful proposition must consist of terms referring directly to the objects with which we are acquainted, or that they are defined by other terms referring to objects with which we are acquainted. Russell excluded some formal, logical terms such as all, the, is, and so forth, from his isomorphic requirement, but he was never entirely satisfied with our understanding of such terms. One of the central themes of Russell's atomism is that the world consists of logically independent facts, a plurality of facts, and that our knowledge depends on the data of our direct experience of them. In his later life, Russell came to doubt aspects of logical atomism, especially his principle of isomorphism, though he continued to believe that the process of philosophy ought to consist of breaking things down into their simplest components, even though we might not ever fully arrive at an ultimate atomic fact.

=== Epistemology ===
Russell's epistemology went through many phases. Once he shed neo-Hegelianism in his early years, Russell remained a philosophical realist for the remainder of his life, believing that our direct experiences have primacy in the acquisition of knowledge. While some of his views have lost favour, his influence remains strong in the distinction between two ways in which we can be familiar with objects: "knowledge by acquaintance" and "knowledge by description". For a time, Russell thought that we could only be acquainted with our own sense data—momentary perceptions of colours, sounds, and the like—and that everything else, including the physical objects that these were sense data of, could only be inferred, or reasoned to—i.e. known by description—and not known directly. This distinction has gained much wider application, though Russell eventually rejected the idea of an intermediate sense datum.

In his later philosophy, Russell subscribed to a kind of neutral monism, maintaining that the distinctions between the material and mental worlds, in the final analysis, were arbitrary, and that both can be reduced to a neutral property—a view similar to one held by the American philosopher/psychologist, William James, and one that was first formulated by Baruch Spinoza, whom Russell greatly admired. Instead of James' "pure experience," however, Russell characterised the stuff of our initial states of perception as "events," a stance which is curiously akin to his old teacher Whitehead's process philosophy.

=== Philosophy of science ===
Russell claimed that he was more convinced of his method of doing philosophy than of his philosophical conclusions. Science was one of the principal components of analysis. Russell was a believer in the scientific method, that science reaches only tentative answers, that scientific progress is piecemeal, and attempts to find organic unities were largely futile. He believed the same was true of philosophy. Russell held that the ultimate objective of both science and philosophy was to understand reality, not simply to make predictions.

Russell's work contributed to philosophy of science's development into a separate branch of philosophy. Much of Russell's thinking about science is expressed in his 1914 book, Our Knowledge of the External World as a Field for Scientific Method in Philosophy, which influenced the logical positivists.

Russell held that of the physical world we know only its abstract structure except for the intrinsic character of our own brain with which we have direct acquaintance (Russell, 1948). Russell said that he had always assumed copunctuality between percepts and non-percepts, and percepts were also part of the physical world, a part of which we knew its intrinsic character directly, knowledge which goes beyond structure. His views on science have become integrated into the contemporary debate in the philosophy of science as a form of epistemic structural realism, people such as Elie Georges Zahar and Ioannis Votsis have discussed the implications of his work for our understanding of science. The seminal article "The Concept of Structure in The Analysis of Matter" by William Demopoulos and Michael Friedman was crucial in reintegrating Russell's views into the contemporary scene.

Russell wrote several science books, including The ABC of Atoms (1923) and The ABC of Relativity (1925).

=== Ethics ===
While Russell wrote a great deal on ethical subject matters, he did not believe that the subject belonged to philosophy or that when he wrote on ethics, he did so in his capacity as a philosopher.

Russell wrote that he was a utilitarian in his youth, yet he later distanced himself from this view. In his earlier years, Russell was greatly influenced by G.E. Moore's Principia Ethica. Along with Moore, he then believed that moral facts were objective, but known only through intuition; that they were simple properties of objects, not equivalent (e.g., pleasure is good) to the natural objects to which they are often ascribed (see Naturalistic fallacy); and that these simple, undefinable moral properties cannot be analysed using the non-moral properties with which they are associated. In time, however, he came to agree with his philosophical hero, David Hume, who believed that ethical terms dealt with subjective values that cannot be verified in the same way as matters of fact.

Coupled with Russell's other doctrines, this influenced the logical positivists, who formulated the theory of emotivism or non-cognitivism, which states that ethical propositions (along with those of metaphysics) were essentially meaningless and nonsensical or, at best, little more than expressions of attitudes and preferences. Notwithstanding his influence on them, Russell himself did not construe ethical propositions as narrowly as the positivists, for he believed that ethical considerations are not only meaningful, but that they are a vital subject matter for civil discourse. Indeed, though Russell was often characterised as the patron saint of rationality, he agreed with Hume, who said that reason ought to be subordinate to ethical considerations.

=== Religion ===
For most of his adult life Russell maintained that religion is little more than superstition and, despite any positive effects that religion might have, it is largely harmful to people. He believed religion and the religious outlook (he considered communism and other systematic ideologies to be forms of religion) serve to impede knowledge, foster fear and dependency, and are responsible for much of the war, oppression, and misery that have beset the world. He was a member of the advisory council of the British Humanist Association and the president of Cardiff Humanists until his death.

Russell described himself in 1947 as an agnostic or an atheist: he found it difficult to determine which term to adopt, saying:

Therefore, in regard to the Olympic gods, speaking to a purely philosophical audience, I would say that I am an Agnostic. But speaking popularly, I think that all of us would say in regard to those gods that we were Atheists. In regard to the Christian God, I should, I think, take exactly the same line.

In his 1949 speech, "Am I an Atheist or an Agnostic?", Russell expressed his difficulty over whether to call himself an atheist or an agnostic:

As a philosopher, if I were speaking to a purely philosophic audience I should say that I ought to describe myself as an Agnostic, because I do not think that there is a conclusive argument by which one can prove that there is not a God. On the other hand, if I am to convey the right impression to the ordinary man in the street I think that I ought to say that I am an Atheist, because, when I say that I cannot prove that there is not a God, I ought to add equally that I cannot prove that there are not the Homeric gods.

— Bertrand Russell, Collected Papers, vol. 11, p. 91

In the 1948 BBC Radio Debate between Bertrand Russell and Frederick Copleston, Russell chose to assume the position of the agnostic. It seems to have been because he admitted to not being able to prove the non-existence of God:

Copleston: Well, my position is the affirmative position that such a being actually exists, and that His existence can be proved philosophically. Perhaps you would tell me if your position is that of agnosticism or of atheism. I mean, would you say that the non-existence of God can be proved?

Russell: No, I should not say that: my position is agnostic.

— Bertrand Russell v. Fr. Copleston, 1948 BBC Radio Debate on the Existence of God

Though he would later question God's existence, he fully accepted the ontological argument during his undergraduate years:

For two or three years...I was a Hegelian. I remember the exact moment during my fourth year [in 1894] when I became one. I had gone out to buy a tin of tobacco, and was going back with it along Trinity Lane, when I suddenly threw it up in the air and exclaimed: "Great God in Boots! – the ontological argument is sound!"

— Bertrand Russell, Autobiography of Bertrand Russell, pg. 60

This quote has been used by many theologians over the years, such as by Louis Pojman in his Philosophy of Religion, who wish for readers to believe that even a well-known atheist philosopher supported this particular argument for God's existence. However, elsewhere in his autobiography, Russell also mentions:

About two years later, I became convinced that there is no life after death, but I still believed in God, because the "First Cause" argument appeared to be irrefutable. At the age of eighteen, however, shortly before I went to Cambridge, I read Mill's Autobiography, where I found a sentence to the effect that his father taught him the question "Who made me?" cannot be answered, since it immediately suggests the further question "Who made God?" This led me to abandon the "First Cause" argument, and to become an atheist.

— Bertrand Russell, Autobiography of Bertrand Russell, pg. 36

Russell made an influential analysis of the omphalos hypothesis enunciated by Philip Henry Gosse—that any argument suggesting that the world was created as if it were already in motion could just as easily make it a few minutes old as a few thousand years:

There is no logical impossibility in the hypothesis that the world sprang into being five minutes ago, exactly as it then was, with a population that "remembered" a wholly unreal past. There is no logically necessary connection between events at different times; therefore nothing that is happening now or will happen in the future can disprove the hypothesis that the world began five minutes ago.

— Bertrand Russell, The Analysis of Mind, 1921, pp. 159–60; cf. Philosophy, Norton, 1927, p. 7, where Russell acknowledges Gosse's paternity of this anti-evolutionary argument.

As a young man, Russell had a decidedly religious bent, himself, as is evident in his early Platonism. He longed for eternal truths, as he makes clear in his famous essay, "A Free Man's Worship", widely regarded as a masterpiece of prose, but a work that Russell came to dislike. While he rejected the supernatural, he freely admitted that he yearned for a deeper meaning to life.

Russell's views on religion can be found in his book, Why I Am Not a Christian and Other Essays on Religion and Related Subjects. Its title essay was a talk given on 6 March 1927 at Battersea Town Hall, under the auspices of the South London Branch of the National Secular Society, UK, and published later that year as a pamphlet. The book also contains other essays in which Russell considers a number of logical arguments for the existence of God, including the first cause argument, the natural-law argument, the argument from design, and moral arguments. He also discusses specifics about Christian theology.

His conclusion:

Religion is based, I think, primarily and mainly upon fear. It is partly the terror of the unknown and partly, as I have said, the wish to feel that you have a kind of elder brother who will stand by you in all your troubles and disputes. [...] A good world needs knowledge, kindliness, and courage; it does not need a regretful hankering after the past or a fettering of the free intelligence by the words uttered long ago by ignorant men.

— Bertrand Russell, Why I Am Not a Christian and Other Essays on Religion and Related Subjects

=== Political philosophy ===
For the advancement of science and protection of liberty of expression, Russell advocated Alfred Henry Lloyd's concept of The Will to Doubt, the recognition, expressed in his book of the same name, that all human knowledge is at most a best guess. He writes that that one should always remember:

None of our beliefs are quite true; all have at least a penumbra of vagueness and error. The methods of increasing the degree of truth in our beliefs are well known; they consist in hearing all sides, trying to ascertain all the relevant facts, controlling our own bias by discussion with people who have the opposite bias, and cultivating a readiness to discard any hypothesis which has proved inadequate. These methods are practised in science, and have built up the body of scientific knowledge. Every man of science whose outlook is truly scientific is ready to admit that what passes for scientific knowledge at the moment is sure to require correction with the progress of discovery; nevertheless, it is near enough to the truth to serve for most practical purposes, though not for all. In science, where alone something approximating to genuine knowledge is to be found, men's attitude is tentative and full of doubt.

==== Freedom of opinion and expression ====
Russell supported freedom of opinion and was an opponent of both censorship and indoctrination. In 1928, he wrote:

The fundamental argument for freedom of opinion is the doubtfulness of all our belief... when the State intervenes to ensure the indoctrination of some doctrine, it does so because there is no conclusive evidence in favour of that doctrine ... It is clear that thought is not free if the profession of certain opinions make it impossible to make a living.

In 1957, he wrote: "'Free thought' means thinking freely ... to be worthy of the name freethinker he must be free of two things: the force of tradition and the tyranny of his own passions."

==== Education ====
Russell has presented ideas on the possible means of control of education in case of scientific dictatorship governments, of the kind of this excerpt taken from Chapter II "General Effects of Scientific Technique" of "The Impact of Science on society":

This subject will make great strides when it is taken up by scientists under a scientific dictatorship. Anaxagoras maintained that snow is black, but no one believed him. The social psychologists of the future will have a number of classes of school children on whom they will try different methods of producing an unshakable conviction that snow is black. Various results will soon be arrived at. First, that the influence of home is obstructive. Second, that not much can be done unless indoctrination begins before the age of ten. Third, that verses set to music and repeatedly intoned are very effective. Fourth, that the opinion that snow is white must be held to show a morbid taste for eccentricity. But I anticipate. It is for future scientists to make these maxims precise and discover exactly how much it costs per head to make children believe that snow is black, and how much less it would cost to make them believe it is dark grey. Although this science will be diligently studied, it will be rigidly confined to the governing class. The populace will not be allowed to know how its convictions were generated. When the technique has been perfected, every government that has been in charge of education for a generation will be able to control its subjects securely without the need of armies or policemen. As yet there is only one country which has succeeded in creating this politician's paradise. The social effects of scientific technique have already been many and important, and are likely to be even more noteworthy in the future. Some of these effects depend upon the political and economic character of the country concerned; others are inevitable, whatever this character may be.

He pushed his visionary scenarios even further into details, in Chapter III "Scientific Technique in an Oligarchy" of the same book, stating as an example:

In future such failures are not likely to occur where there is dictatorship. Diet, injections, and injunctions will combine, from a very early age, to produce the sort of character and the sort of beliefs that the authorities consider desirable, and any serious criticism of the powers that be will become psychologically impossible. Even if all are miserable, all will believe themselves happy, because the government will tell them that they are so.

== Political positions ==
Political and social activism occupied much of Russell's time for most of his life, which makes his prodigious and seminal writing on a wide range of technical and non-technical subjects all the more remarkable.

Russell remained politically active to the end of his life, writing to and exhorting world leaders and lending his name to various causes. Some maintain that during his last few years he gave his youthful followers too much license and that they used his name for some outlandish purposes of which a more attentive Russell would not have approved. There is evidence to show that he became aware of this when he fired his private secretary, Ralph Schoenman, then a young firebrand of the radical left.

Russell often characterised his moral and political writings as lying outside the scope of philosophy, but Russell's admirers and detractors are often more acquainted with his pronouncements on social and political matters, or what some (e.g., biographer Ray Monk) have called his "journalism", than they are with his technical, philosophical work. There is a marked tendency to conflate these matters, and to judge Russell the philosopher on what he himself would certainly consider to be his non-philosophical opinions. Russell often cautioned people to make this distinction. Beginning in the 1920s, Russell wrote frequently for The Nation on changing morals, nuclear disarmament and literature. In 1965, he wrote that the magazine "...has been one of the few voices which has been heard on behalf of individual liberty and social justice consistently throughout its existence."

Paul McCartney, a member of The Beatles, said that after he met with Russell at his house and discussed the Vietnam war with him, McCartney inspired John Lennon and the band to take an anti-war stance.

=== Pacifism, war, and nuclear weapons ===
Russell was originally a Liberal Imperialist but in 1901 converted to anti-imperialism, pacifism and a Pro-Boer standpoint with regards to the Second Boer War. He was later involved in the Union of Democratic Control.

He resisted specific wars on the grounds that they were contrary to the interests of civilisation, and thus immoral. On the other hand, his 1915 article on "The Ethics of War", he defended wars of colonisation on the same utilitarian grounds: he felt conquest was justified if the side with the more advanced civilisation could put the land to better use.

Russell's activism against British participation in World War I led to fines, a loss of freedom of travel within Britain, and the non-renewal of his fellowship at Trinity College, Cambridge, and he was eventually sentenced to prison in 1918 on the tenuous grounds that he had interfered in British foreign policy – he had argued that British workers should be wary of the United States Army, for it had experience in strike-breaking. He was released after serving six months, but was still closely supervised until the end of the war. Russell contended that "the abolition of private ownership of land and capital is a necessary step toward any world in which the nations are to live at peace with one another".

In 1943 Russell called his stance towards warfare "relative political pacifism" – he held that war was always a great evil, but in some particularly extreme circumstances (such as when Adolf Hitler threatened to take over Europe) it might be a lesser of multiple evils. In the years leading to World War II, he supported the policy of appeasement; but by 1940 he acknowledged that to preserve democracy, Hitler had to be defeated. This same reluctant value compromise was shared by his acquaintance A.A. Milne.

Russell consistently opposed the continued existence of nuclear weapons ever since their first use. However, on 20 November 1948, in a public speech at Westminster School, addressing a gathering arranged by the New Commonwealth, Russell shocked some observers with comments that seemed to suggest a preemptive nuclear strike on the Soviet Union might be justified. Russell apparently argued that the threat of war between the United States and the Soviet Union would enable the United States to force the Soviet Union to accept the Baruch Plan for international atomic energy control. (Earlier in the year he had written in the same vein to Walter W. Marseille.) Russell felt this plan "had very great merits and showed considerable generosity, when it is remembered that America still had an unbroken nuclear monopoly." (Has Man a Future?, 1961).

Nicholas Griffin of McMaster University, in his book The Selected Letters of Bertrand Russell: The Public Years, 1914–1970, interpreted Russell's wording as advocating not the actual use of the atom bomb, but merely its diplomatic use as a massive source of leverage over the actions of the Soviets.

Griffin's interpretation was disputed by Nigel Lawson; the former British Chancellor, who was present at the speech. Lawson claims it was quite clear that Russell was advocating an actual first strike, a view that is consistent with that reported by Hermann Bondi in Bondi's autobiography (Science, Churchill and Me, 1990, p60) recounting Russell's views from the time when Russell and Bondi were fellows of Trinity College in Cambridge. Whichever interpretation is correct, Russell later relented, instead arguing for mutual disarmament by the nuclear powers, possibly linked to some form of world government.

The Soviet interpretation seems to be negative. Izvestia dismissed Bertrand Russell, as “the English Fascist Malthusian Philosopher.” Hitler had “found worthy successors in England,” wrote one Soviet commentator. Fortunately, though, humanity was not compelled to take “the path of degeneration along which Fascist creatures like Bertrand Russell are leading it.”

In 1955, Russell released the Russell-Einstein Manifesto, co-signed by Albert Einstein and nine other leading scientists and intellectuals, a document which led to the first of the Pugwash Conferences on Science and World Affairs in 1957. In 1957-58, Russell became the first president of the Campaign for Nuclear Disarmament, which advocated unilateral nuclear disarmament by Britain. He resigned two years later when the CND would not support civil disobedience, and formed the Committee of 100. In September 1961 he was imprisoned for a week under the Justices of the Peace Act 1361 for refusing to call off a huge ban-the-bomb demonstration at the Ministry of Defence organised by the Committee of 100. He served the sentence in the hospital of Brixton Prison.

During the Cuban Missile Crisis, Russell sent telegrams to US President John F. Kennedy, Soviet Premier Nikita Khrushchev, the UN Secretary-General U Thant and British Prime Minister Harold Macmillan. His telegrams were greatly critical of Kennedy, who he had already singled out earlier as "more dangerous than Hitler", and tolerant of Khrushchev. Khrushchev replied with a long letter, published by the Soviet news agency TASS, which was mainly addressed to Kennedy and the Western world.

Increasingly concerned about the potential danger to humanity arising from nuclear weapons and other scientific discoveries, he also joined with Einstein, Robert Oppenheimer, Joseph Rotblat and other eminent scientists of the day to establish the World Academy of Art and Science which was formally constituted in 1960.

The Bertrand Russell Peace Foundation and its publishing imprint Spokesman Books began work in 1963 to carry forward Russell's work for peace, human rights and social justice.

==== Korea and Vietnam ====
He began public opposition to US policy in Vietnam with a letter to The New York Times dated 28 March 1963. By the autumn of 1966, he had completed the manuscript War Crimes in Vietnam. Then, using the American justifications for the Nuremberg Trials, Russell, along with Jean-Paul Sartre, organised what he called an international War Crimes Tribunal, the Russell Tribunal.

Russell supported Korean nationalism, referring to North Koreans and South Koreans as "cousins".

=== Communism, anarchism and socialism ===
Russell was, prior to being a socialist, a Georgist.

In 1914 he wrote to Lady Ottoline Morrell saying "It is clear the Socialists are the hope of the world". Russell expressed support for guild socialism. He was also an admirer of Franklin Delano Roosevelt and Eduard Bernstein.

Russell expressed great hope in "the Communist experiment". However, when he visited the Soviet Union and met Vladimir Lenin in 1920, he was unimpressed with the system in place. On his return he wrote a critical tract, The Practice and Theory of Bolshevism. In later years he said of Lenin that he was "less impressed by Lenin than I expected to be" but also that he was a "great man". He considered him to be similar to a religious zealot as he said that Lenin believed "anything could be proved by quoting a text in Marx and he was quite incapable of supposing that there could be anything in Marx which wasn't right".

While in the Soviet Union he was "infinitely unhappy in this atmosphere – stifled by its utilitarianism, its indifference to love and beauty and the life of impulse." He was critical of Soviet Russia but still believed "that Communism is necessary to the world". Despite his criticism he nevertheless praised the Russian Revolution as "heroism" which had "fired men’s hopes in a way which was essential to the realization of Communism in the future" and that therefore "Bolshevism deserves the gratitude and admiration of all the progressive part of mankind"

Later in his life, Russell completely denounced Marxism and communism, stating that:

The theoretical doctrines of Communism are for the most part derived from Marx. My objections to Marx are of two sorts: one, that he was muddle-headed; and the other, that his thinking was almost entirely inspired by hatred. [...] I have always disagreed with Marx. My first hostile criticism of him was published in 1896. But my objections to modern Communism go deeper than my objections to Marx. It is the abandonment of democracy that I find particularly disastrous. [...] Communism is a doctrine bred of poverty, hatred and strife. Its spread can only be arrested by diminishing the area of poverty and hatred.

In the 1922 and 1923 general elections Russell stood as a Labour Party candidate in the Chelsea constituency, but only on the basis that he knew he was extremely unlikely to be elected in such a safe Conservative seat, and he was not on either occasion.

He was strongly critical of Joseph Stalin's regime, writing that Stalin was responsible for millions of deaths. Between 1945 and 1947, together with A. J. Ayer and George Orwell, he contributed a series of articles to Polemic, a short-lived British "Magazine of Philosophy, Psychology, and Aesthetics" edited by the ex-Communist Humphrey Slater.

Russell was a consistent enthusiast for democracy and world government, and he advocated the establishment of a democratic international government in some of the essays collected in In Praise of Idleness (1935), and also in Has Man a Future? (1961).

Russell wrote of Michael Bakunin that "we do not find in Bakunin's works a clear picture of the society at which he aimed, or any argument to prove that such a society could be stable." Russell did not believe that an anarchist society was "realizable" but that "it cannot be denied that Kropotkin presents it with extraordinary persuasiveness and charm."

=== Women's suffrage ===
As a young man, Russell was a member of the Liberal Party and wrote in favour of women's suffrage. In his 1910 pamphlet, Anti-Suffragist Anxieties, Russell wrote that some men opposed suffrage because they "fear that their liberty to act in ways that are injurious to women will be curtailed." In May 1907, Russell stood for Parliament as a woman's suffrage candidate in Wimbledon, but was not elected.

=== Sexuality ===
Russell wrote against Victorian notions of morality. Marriage and Morals (1929) expressed his opinion that sex between a man and woman who are not married to each other is not necessarily immoral if they truly love one another, and advocated "trial marriages" or "companionate marriage", formalised relationships whereby young people could legitimately have sexual intercourse without being expected to remain married in the long term or to have children (an idea first proposed by Judge Ben Lindsey). This was enough to raise vigorous protests and denunciations against him during his visit to the United States shortly after the book's publication. Russell was also one of the first intellectuals to advocate open sex education and widespread access to contraception. He also advocated easy divorce, but only if the marriage had produced no children – Russell's view was that parents should remain married but tolerant of each other's sexual infidelity, if they had children. This reflected his life at the time – his second wife Dora was openly having an affair, and would soon become pregnant by another man, but Russell was keen for their children John and Kate to have a "normal" family life.

Russell was also an active supporter of the Homosexual Law Reform Society, being one of the signatories of A.E. Dyson's 1958 letter to The Times calling for a change in the law regarding male homosexual practices, which were partly legalised in 1967, when Russell was still alive.

=== Race ===
As with his views on religion, which developed considerably throughout his long life, Russell's views on the matter of race did not remain fixed. By 1951, Russell was a vocal advocate of racial equality and intermarriage; he penned a chapter on "Racial Antagonism" in New Hopes for a Changing World (1951), which read:

It is sometimes maintained that racial mixture is biologically undesirable. There is no evidence whatever for this view. Nor is there, apparently, any reason to think that Negroes are congenitally less intelligent than white people, but as to that it will be difficult to judge until they have equal scope and equally good social conditions.

— Bertrand Russell, New Hopes for a Changing World (London: Allen & Unwin, 1951, p. 108)

Passages in some of his early writings support birth control. On 16 November 1922, for instance, he gave a lecture to the General Meeting of Dr. Marie Stopes's Society for Constructive Birth Control and Racial Progress on "Birth Control and International Relations", in which he described the importance of extending Western birth control worldwide; his remarks anticipated the population control movement of the 1960s and the role of the United Nations.

This policy may last some time, but in the end under it we shall have to give way—we are only putting off the evil day; the one real remedy is birth control, that is getting the people of the world to limit themselves to those numbers which they can keep upon their own soil... I do not see how we can hope permanently to be strong enough to keep the coloured races out; sooner or later they are bound to overflow, so the best we can do is to hope that those nations will see the wisdom of Birth Control.... We need a strong international authority.

— "Lecture by the Hon. Bertrand Russell", Birth Control News, vol 1, no. 8 (December 1922), p.2

Another passage from early editions of his book Marriage and Morals (1929), which Russell later claimed to be referring only to environmental conditioning, and which he significantly modified in later editions, reads:

In extreme cases, there can be little doubt of the superiority of one race to another [...] It seems on the whole fair to regard Negroes as on the average inferior to white men, although for work in the tropics they are indispensable, so that their extermination (apart from the question of humanity) would be highly undesirable.

— Bertrand Russell, Marriage and Morals, pg. 266 (1929)

However, in 1932 he condemned the "unwarranted assumption" that "Negroes are congenitally inferior to white men" (Education and the Social Order, Chap. 3).

Responding in 1964 to a correspondent's inquiry, "Do you still consider the Negroes an inferior race, as you did when you wrote Marriage and Morals?", Russell replied:

I never held Negroes to be inherently inferior. The statement in Marriage and Morals refers to environmental conditioning. I have had it withdrawn from subsequent editions because it is clearly ambiguous.

— Bertrand Russell, letter dated 17 March 1964 in Dear Bertrand Russell... a selection of his correspondence with the general public, 1950–1968. edited by Barry Feinberg and Ronald Kasrils. (London: Allen & Unwin, 1969, p. 146)

=== JFK Assassination ===
Russell criticised the official account of the assassination of John F. Kennedy in "16 Questions on the Assassination", 1964. He was thanked in the acknowledgements section of Mark Lane's book Rush to Judgment for being "kind enough to read the manuscript and make suggestions", and after Simon & Schuster had declined to publish the book, Russell attempted to convince them otherwise. He also served as President of the British Who Killed Kennedy? Committee, in Russell's words the organisation was set up "for the purpose of making known the material [Lane] has uncovered and his further findings".

He is also thanked in Jim Garrison's On the Trail of the Assassins for "his early encouragement of my efforts".

Russell condemned the Warren Report as a "sorrily incompetent document" and said "it is clear that much is still being hidden". He argued that there were a number of "disturbing anomalies" regarding the assassination and that the Warren Commission had failed to deal with these doubts, that it instead "evades the facts". He believed that medical evidence had been altered and that "three contradictory official versions" had been put out.

=== China ===
In 1922 Russell visited China and remarked that "China, by her resources and her population, is capable of being the greatest power in the world after the United States".

=== Israel ===
Before the creation of the state of Israel, Russell expressed his support for Zionism. However, after its establishment, Russell would criticise the state of Israel on several occasions. On 31 January 1970, Russell issued a statement condemning "Israel's aggression in the Middle East", and in particular, Israeli bombing raids being carried out deep in Egyptian territory as part of the War of Attrition, which he compared to German bombing raids in the Battle of Britain and the US bombing of Vietnam. He called for an Israeli withdrawal to the pre-Six-Day War borders. This was Russell's final political statement or act. It was read out at the International Conference of Parliamentarians in Cairo on 3 February 1970, the day after his death.

He called for a "world campaign" to "help bring justice to the long-suffering people of the Middle East". He added that "No people anywhere in the world would accept being expelled en masse from their own country; how can anyone require the people of Palestine to accept a punishment that nobody else would tolerate?".

=== Eugenics ===
Russell discussed eugenics heavily in his 1929 book Marriage and Morals. He expressed agreement with the basic idea, while criticizing specific views and positions eugenicists held (particularly a strong class bias). Russell accepted a forced sterilization policy for negative eugenics, but only that of "mental defectives", condemning some laws for being overly broad. He also cautioned that eugenics policies had to account for scientific evidence, such as not making claims that all criminal behaviour had genetic causes when psychology indicated otherwise. In terms of positive eugenics, he felt that free education should be provided for only to the professional classes, based not on the merits of the children, but of the parents, so that children do not suffer from cramming for scholarship examinations, which causes physical and mental damage. Russell also acknowledge the difficulty of deciding what desirable traits are, and that tradeoffs can exist (e.g. to breed for strength might diminish intelligence). He also acknowledged that to practice eugenics would entail a radical disruption of the family, feeling that a select group from the population might be set apart solely to breed in the future. While finding this idea repugnant, he thought it might nonetheless be effective. Discussing "race" eugenics, he felt the prevalent racist views were largely an excuse for chauvinism, and dismissed concerns about white people being outbred by East Asians. He considered some peoples inferior due to "environmental conditioning". He felt that in the future people might well select sexual partners for procreation voluntarily due to eugenic considerations. Russell felt certain eugenics views would win out in the future and become law. He conceded that it was repugnant to people and a "scientific tyranny" could arise, but felt this would be better than religious tyranny.

However, Russell also frequently stated his deep concern that eugenics would be used for political ends, rather than to improve humanity, stating, for instance, in a 1963 letter to eugenics proponent Julian Huxley, "Exceptional merit is, and always has been, disliked by Authority; and obviously Authority would control the sperm-bank. [...] I am entirely with you as to what eugenics could achieve, but I disagree as to what it would achieve.". This attitude also led to him supporting sterilisation of the "feebleminded", as he felt it, compared to the alternative of committal to an institution, preserved the ability of the sterilised to participate in society, and thus guarded against the possibility that a government would label its political opponents as "feebleminded" to silence them. He also expressed scepticism about the claims contemporary eugenicists made about the influence of heredity, such as in his 1932 book Education and the Social Order where he stated that the "practical inferences" drawn by eugenicists were unscientific due to the lack of knowledge about which traits were hereditary.

== Personal life ==
In 1889, Russell, aged 17, met the family of Alys Pearsall Smith, an American Quaker five years his senior and a graduate of Bryn Mawr College near Philadelphia. He became a friend of the Pearsall Smith family. They knew him as "Lord John's grandson" and enjoyed showing him off.

He fell in love with Alys, and contrary to his grandmother's wishes, married her on 13 December 1894. Their marriage began to fall apart in 1901 when it occurred to Russell, while cycling, that he no longer loved her. She asked him if he loved her, and he factually replied that he did not. Russell also disliked Alys's mother, finding her controlling and cruel. A lengthy period of separation began in 1911 with Russell's affair with Lady Ottoline Morrell, and he and Alys finally divorced in 1921 to enable Russell to remarry. During his years of separation from Alys, Russell had affairs (often simultaneous) with a number of women, including Morrell and the actress Lady Constance Malleson. Some have suggested that at this point he had an affair with Vivienne Haigh-Wood, the English governess and writer, and first wife of T. S. Eliot.

In 1921, his second marriage was to Dora Winifred Black (died 1986), daughter of Sir Frederick Black. Dora was six months pregnant when the couple returned to England. The marriage was dissolved in 1935, having produced two children:

- John Conrad Russell, 4th Earl Russell (1921–1987)
- Lady Katharine Jane Russell (1923–2021), who married Rev. Charles Tait in 1948 and had issue

Additionally, Russell was temporarily registered as the birth father of Dora Russell's daughter, Harriett Ruth Barry (1930-2024), but this was reversed at some point and Harriett's father was correctly registered as American journalist Griffin Barry. Dora Russell also gave birth to a son by Griffin Barry in 1932, Roderick Barry (1932-1983). Though the Russell marriage was an open one, the Barry children's births led to a dissolution of the marriage and Russell divorced Dora. Russell did continue to be involved in both Barry children's lives, though not closely.

Russell's third marriage was to his student Patricia Helen Spence (d. 2004) in 1936, with the marriage producing one child:

- Conrad Sebastian Robert Russell, 5th Earl Russell (1937–2004), who became a historian and one of the leading figures in the Liberal Democrat party.

Russell's third marriage ended in divorce in 1952. He married Edith Finch in the same year. They remained married at the time of his death in 1970; Finch died in 1978.

== Legacy ==
In 1980, a memorial to Russell was commissioned by a committee including the philosopher A. J. Ayer. It consists of a bust of Russell in Red Lion Square in London sculpted by Marcelle Quinton.

Lady Katharine Jane Tait, Russell's daughter, founded the Bertrand Russell Society in 1974 to preserve and understand his work. It publishes the Bertrand Russell Society Bulletin, holds meetings and awards prizes for scholarship, including the Bertrand Russell Society Award. She also authored several essays about her father; as well as a book, My Father, Bertrand Russell, which was published in 1975. All members receive Russell: The Journal of Bertrand Russell Studies.

For the sesquicentennial of his birth, in May 2022, McMaster University's Bertrand Russell Archive, the university's largest and most heavily used research collection, organised both a physical and virtual exhibition on Russell's anti-nuclear stance in the post-war era, Scientists for Peace: the Russell-Einstein Manifesto and the Pugwash Conference, which included the earliest version of the Russell–Einstein Manifesto. The Bertrand Russell Peace Foundation held a commemoration at Conway Hall in Red Lion Square, London, on 18 May, the anniversary of his birth.

Bangladesh's first leader, Mujibur Rahman, named his youngest son Sheikh Russel in honour of Bertrand Russell.

== Awards and honours ==
Upon his brother's death in 1931, Russell became the 3rd Earl Russell of Kingston Russell, and the subsidiary title of Viscount Amberley of Amberley and of Ardsalla. He held both titles, and the accompanying seat in the House of Lords, until his death in 1970.

Country	Date	Award
United Kingdom	1932	De Morgan Medal
United Kingdom	1934	Sylvester Medal
United Kingdom	1949	Order of Merit
Sweden	1950	Nobel Prize in Literature
United Nations	1957	Kalinga Prize
Israel	1963	Jerusalem Prize

=== Scholastic ===
Date	School/association	Award/position
1893	Trinity College, Cambridge	First Class Honours in Mathematics
1894	Trinity College, Cambridge	First Class Honours in Philosophy
1895	Trinity College, Cambridge	Fellowship
1896	London School of Economics and Political Science	Lecturer
1899, 1901, 1910, 1915	Trinity College, Cambridge	Lecturer
1908	The Royal Society	Fellowship
1911	Aristotelian Society	President
1914	Harvard University	Visiting lecturer
1938	University of Chicago	Visiting Professor of Philosophy
1939	University of California at Los Angeles	Professor of Philosophy
1940	Harvard University	William James Lecturer
1941–42	Barnes Foundation	Lecturer
1944–49	Trinity College, Cambridge	Fellowship
1949	Trinity College, Cambridge	Lifetime Fellowship

=== Arms ===
Coat of arms of Bertrand Russell
Crest A goat statant argent, armed and unguled or. Escutcheon Argent, a lion rampant gules, on a chief sable, three escallops of the field, over the centre escallop a mullet. Supporters Dexter, a lion gules; sinister, an heraldic antelope gules, armed, unguled, tufted, ducally gorged and chained, the chain reflexed over the back or; each supporter charged on the shoulder with a mullet argent. Motto Che sara sara (What must be must be). Orders The Order of Merit (OM).

== Selected works ==
Below are selected Russell's works in English, sorted by year of first publication:

- 1896. German Social Democracy. London: Longmans, Green & Co.
- 1897. An Essay on the Foundations of Geometry. Cambridge: Cambridge University Press
- 1900. A Critical Exposition of the Philosophy of Leibniz. Cambridge: Cambridge University Press
- 1903. The Principles of Mathematics. Cambridge University Press
- 1903. A Free Man's Worship.
- 1905. On Denoting, Mind, Vol. 14. ISSN 0026-4423. Basil Blackwell
- 1910. Philosophical Essays. London: Longmans, Green
- 1910–1913. Principia Mathematica (with Alfred North Whitehead). 3 vols. Cambridge: Cambridge University Press
- 1912. The Problems of Philosophy. London: Williams and Norgate
- 1914. Our Knowledge of the External World as a Field for Scientific Method in Philosophy. Chicago and London: Open Court Publishing.
- 1916. Principles of Social Reconstruction. London, George Allen and Unwin
- 1916. Why Men Fight. New York: The Century Co (American title of Principles of Social Reconstruction, 1916)
- 1916. The Policy of the Entente, 1904–1914: A Reply to Professor Gilbert Murray. Manchester: The National Labour Press
- 1916. Justice in War-time. Chicago: Open Court (contains The Policy of the Entente, 1904–1914 above)
- 1917. Political Ideals. New York: The Century Co.
- 1918. Mysticism and Logic and Other Essays. London: George Allen & Unwin
- 1918. Proposed Roads to Freedom: Socialism, Anarchism, and Syndicalism. London: George Allen & Unwin
- 1919. Introduction to Mathematical Philosophy. London: George Allen & Unwin. (ISBN 0-415-09604-9 for Routledge paperback)
- 1920. The Practice and Theory of Bolshevism. London: George Allen & Unwin
- 1921. The Analysis of Mind. London: George Allen & Unwin
- 1922. The Problem of China. London: George Allen & Unwin
- 1922. Free Thought and Official Propaganda, delivered at South Place Institute
- 1923. The Prospects of Industrial Civilization, in collaboration with Dora Russell. London: George Allen & Unwin
- 1923. The ABC of Atoms, London: Kegan Paul. Trench, Trubner
- 1924. Icarus; or, The Future of Science. London: Kegan Paul, Trench, Trubner
- 1925. The ABC of Relativity. London: Kegan Paul, Trench, Trubner; reprinted (1966) by London: George Allen & Unwin
- 1925. What I Believe. London: Kegan Paul, Trench, Trubner
- 1926. On Education, Especially in Early Childhood. London: George Allen & Unwin
- 1927. Why I Am Not a Christian, delivered at Battersea Town Hall, published by London: Watts
- 1927. The Analysis of Matter. London: Kegan Paul, Trench, Trubner
- 1927. Selected Papers of Bertrand Russell. New York: Modern Library (reprint of earlier essays)
- 1927. An Outline of Philosophy. London: George Allen & Unwin
- 1928. Sceptical Essays. London: George Allen & Unwin
- 1929. Marriage and Morals. London: George Allen & Unwin
- 1930. The Conquest of Happiness. London: George Allen & Unwin
- 1931. The Scientific Outlook. London: George Allen & Unwin
- 1932. Education and the Social Order. London: George Allen & Unwin
- 1934. Freedom and Organization, 1814–1914. London: George Allen & Unwin
- 1935. In Praise of Idleness and Other Essays. London: George Allen & Unwin
- 1935. Religion and Science. London: Thornton Butterworth
- 1936. Which Way to Peace?. London: Jonathan Cape
- 1937. The Amberley Papers: The Letters and Diaries of Lord and Lady Amberley, with Patricia Russell, 2 vols., London: Leonard & Virginia Woolf at the Hogarth Press; reprinted (1966) as The Amberley Papers. Bertrand Russell's Family Background, 2 vols., London: George Allen & Unwin
- 1938. Power: A New Social Analysis. London: George Allen & Unwin
- 1940. An Inquiry into Meaning and Truth. New York: W. W. Norton & Company.
- 1945. The Bomb and Civilisation. Published in the Glasgow Forward on 18 August 1945
- 1946. A History of Western Philosophy and Its Connection with Political and Social Circumstances from the Earliest Times to the Present Day New York: Simon and Schuster
- 1948. Human Knowledge: Its Scope and Limits. London: George Allen & Unwin
- 1949. Authority and the Individual. London: George Allen & Unwin
- 1950. Unpopular Essays. London: George Allen & Unwin
- 1951. The Impact of Science on Society. London: George Allen & Unwin
- 1951–1969. The Autobiography of Bertrand Russell, 3 vols., London: George Allen & Unwin. Vol. 2, 1956
- 1952. New Hopes for a Changing World. London: George Allen & Unwin
- 1953. Satan in the Suburbs and Other Stories. London: George Allen & Unwin
- 1954. Nightmares of Eminent Persons and Other Stories. London: George Allen & Unwin
- 1954. Human Society in Ethics and Politics. London: George Allen & Unwin
- 1956. Portraits from Memory and Other Essays. London: George Allen & Unwin
- 1956. Logic and Knowledge: Essays 1901–1950, edited by Robert C. Marsh. London: George Allen & Unwin
- 1957. Why I Am Not a Christian and Other Essays on Religion and Related Subjects, edited by Paul Edwards. London: George Allen & Unwin
- 1957. Understanding History and Other Essays. New York: Philosophical Library (reprint of earlier essays)
- 1958. The Will to Doubt. New York: Philosophical Library (reprint of earlier essays)
- 1959. Common Sense and Nuclear Warfare. London: George Allen & Unwin
- 1959. My Philosophical Development. London: George Allen & Unwin
- 1959. Wisdom of the West: A Historical Survey of Western Philosophy in Its Social and Political Setting, edited by Paul Foulkes. London: Macdonald
- 1960. Bertrand Russell Speaks His Mind, Cleveland and New York: World Publishing Company
- 1961. The Basic Writings of Bertrand Russell, edited by R. E. Egner and L. E. Denonn. London: George Allen & Unwin
- 1961. Fact and Fiction. London: George Allen & Unwin
- 1961. Has Man a Future? London: George Allen & Unwin
- 1963. Essays in Skepticism. New York: Philosophical Library (reprint of earlier essays)
- 1963. Unarmed Victory. London: George Allen & Unwin
- 1965. Legitimacy Versus Industrialism, 1814–1848. London: George Allen & Unwin (first published as Parts I and II of Freedom and Organization, 1814–1914, 1934)
- 1965. On the Philosophy of Science, edited by Charles A. Fritz, Jr. Indianapolis: The Bobbs–Merrill Company
- 1967. War Crimes in Vietnam. London: George Allen & Unwin
- 1969. Dear Bertrand Russell... A Selection of his Correspondence with the General Public 1950–1968, edited by Barry Feinberg and Ronald Kasrils. London: George Allen and Unwin

Russell was the author of more than sixty books and over two thousand articles. Additionally, he wrote many pamphlets, introductions, and letters to the editor. One pamphlet, titled "I Appeal unto Caesar": The Case of the Conscientious Objectors, ghostwritten for Margaret Hobhouse, the mother of imprisoned peace activist Stephen Hobhouse, allegedly helped secure the release from prison of hundreds of conscientious objectors.

His works can be found in anthologies and collections, including The Collected Papers of Bertrand Russell, which McMaster University began publishing in 1983. By January 2026, this collection of his shorter and previously unpublished works included 22 volumes, and 13 more are in progress for a total of 35 planned volumes. A bibliography in three additional volumes catalogues his publications. The Russell Archives held by McMaster's William Ready Division of Archives and Research Collections possess over 40,000 of his letters.

== See also ==
- Cambridge University Moral Sciences Club
- Criticism of Jesus
- Information Research Department
- Joseph Conrad (Russell's impression)
- List of peace activists
- List of pioneers in computer science
- Logicomix, a graphic novel about the foundational quest in mathematics, the narrator of the story being Bertrand Russell and with his life as the main storyline
- Union of Democratic Control

== Notes ==
Peerage of the United Kingdom
Preceded by Frank Russell	Earl Russell; 1931–1970	Succeeded by John Russell
