= Linguistic intergroup bias =

Linguistic intergroup bias is a term coined by Anne Maass and her colleagues. It is a model of stereotype maintenance stating that positive in-group descriptions and negative out-group descriptions are abstract and vague, while negative in-group descriptions and positive out-group descriptions are specific and observable. Linguistic intergroup bias is more likely to occur when out-group members are performing a group stereotype consistent action. This implies that the linguistic intergroup bias is a cognitive process that requires little motivation.

== Mechanism ==
Research in social psychology shows that linguistic intergroup bias is driven by differences in how people describe in-group and out-group behaviors using abstract or concrete language. Positive behaviors performed by in-group members are more often expressed with abstract trait terms (e.g., “kind” or “honest”), which generalize the behavior and imply a stable disposition. In contrast, negative behaviors by in-group members are typically described in more concrete and situational terms, which makes them easier to dismiss as exceptions. The pattern reverses for out-group members: negative out-group actions are described abstractly, while positive actions are described concretely.

Abstract statements are vague and harder to prove wrong, while, concrete statements are specific, and easy to brush off as exceptions to the rule, therefore keeping stereotypes intact.

This linguistic asymmetry helps preserve existing group stereotypes because abstract descriptions encourage broad and dispositional interpretations, whereas concrete descriptions limit generalization. The process occurs automatically and with minimal cognitive effort, and is thought to be guided by motivational factors such as maintaining a positive social identity.

== Research ==
Recent research has identified a related linguistic effect in which counter-stereotypical individuals are liked significantly less than stereotypical individuals when they are described using behaviours but are liked significantly more when they are described using traits. For example, people like “a man who is crying” less than “a woman who is crying” but they like “a sensitive man” more than “a sensitive woman”. In both cases, the man would be seen as counter-stereotypical and the woman would be seen as stereotypical.

However, in the former case the man and woman are both described using a behaviour (“crying”) and in the latter case they are described using a trait (“sensitive”) suggests that this behaviour-trait effect is caused by differences in cognitive processing. Research suggests that counter-stereotypical individuals are evaluated relatively negatively when they are described using behaviours because this linguistic description promotes deeper and more systematic processing which highlights the individuals’ stereotype disconfirmation. In contrast, counter-stereotypical individuals are evaluated relatively positively when they are described using traits because this linguistic description promotes heuristic processing which highlights the individuals’ uniqueness.

== See also ==
- Bias
- Emotive conjugation
- In-group and out-group
- Prejudice
- Stereotypes
- Racism
