= Ray Monk =

British biographer born 1957

Ray Monk FRSL
- Born: 15 February 1957 (age 69)

Education
- Education: University of York (M.A., 1979); University of Oxford (MLitt)

Philosophical work
- Era: Contemporary philosophy
- Region: Western philosophy
- School: Analytic philosophy, postanalytic philosophy
- Institutions: University of Southampton
- Main interests: Philosophical biography, history of analytic philosophy, philosophy of mathematics, veganism

Ray Monk FRSL (born 15 February 1957) is a British biographer who is renowned for his biographies of Ludwig Wittgenstein, Bertrand Russell, and J. Robert Oppenheimer. He is emeritus professor of philosophy at the University of Southampton, where he taught in various capacities from 1992 to 2018.

== Biography ==
Monk graduated with an M.A. in Philosophy from the University of York in 1979. Later he obtained an MLitt from the University of Oxford.

He won the 1990 John Llewellyn Rhys Prize and the 1991 Duff Cooper Prize for his acclaimed biography of Ludwig Wittgenstein, Ludwig Wittgenstein: The Duty of Genius. His two-volume biography of Bertrand Russell appeared in 1996 and 2001. His biography of J. Robert Oppenheimer was published in 2012.

Since 2012 he has occasionally written for the New Statesman, contributing articles on philosophers and on veganism.

In 2015 he was elected as a Fellow of the Royal Society of Literature.

== Works ==
- Ludwig Wittgenstein: The Duty of Genius. New York: The Free Press. 1990. ISBN 978-0-14-015995-0.
- Bertrand Russell: The Spirit of Solitude 1872–1921. London: Vintage Books, 1996.
- Russell. London: Weidenfeld & Nicolson, 1997.
- Bertrand Russell: The Ghost of Madness 1921–1970. London: Vintage Books, 2001.
- "Philosophical Biography: The Very Idea". In Klagge, James C., ed. (2001). Wittgenstein: Biography and Philosophy. Cambridge University Press. ISBN 978-0-521-00868-6. pp. 3-15.
- How to Read Wittgenstein. London: Granta Books, 2005.
- Robert Oppenheimer: A Life Inside the Center. New York; Toronto: Doubleday. 2012. ISBN 978-0-385-50407-2.
  - Robert Oppenheimer: A Life Inside the Center. London: Jonathan Cape/Random House. 2012. ISBN 978-0224-062626.
  - Inside the Centre: The Life of J. Robert Oppenheimer. London: Jonathan Cape, 2012; Robert Oppenheimer: A Life Inside the Center. New York: Doubleday, 2013.
  - Robert Oppenheimer: A Life Inside the Center (First Anchor books ed.). New York: Anchor Books. 2014. ISBN 978-0385722049.
- "Ludwig Wittgenstein: A Sketch of His Life" (chapter in A Companion to Wittgenstein, edited by Hans-Johann Glock and John Hyman. Wiley-Blackwell, 2017)
