= Walter W. Marseille =

German-American psychoanalyst and graphologist

Walter William Marseille (born 1901) was a German-American psychoanalyst and graphologist. In 1948, he corresponded with Albert Einstein and Bertrand Russell, advocating world government.

== Life ==
Walter Marseille was the son of Gustav Marseille, a leader in the progressive education movement. He studied psychology, mathematics, history, and philosophy at Heidelberg University, the University of Freiburg, and the Ludwig-Maximilians-Universität München. In 1926, he took a doctorate under Martin Heidegger at Marburg University. Further information is given by his friend Karl Löwith. From 1928 to 1933, Marseille followed the workshops (Arbeitsgemeinschaft) of Heinrich Jacoby in Berlin; his address was Dernburgstr. 34, Charlottenburg (Berlin). He later claimed to have broken with Heidegger in 1932 over Heidegger's refusal to condemn Nazism. Löwith tells us that Marseille left Germany in 1933, went to Vienna where he married a woman of Jewish origin, and then immigrated to the United States. He trained as a psychoanalyst at the Berlin Psychoanalytic Institute and the Vienna Psychoanalytic Society, and took Ruth Mack Brunswick as his training analyst.

Marseille was hired by Paul Lazarsfeld in 1940 to analyse the handwriting of mail received by US Senators during the debate on the conscription bill, and developed an index for the cultural rating of handwriting.

In April 1948 Marseille sent a paper, "A Method to Enforce World Peace", to both Bertrand Russell and Albert Einstein. A copy of the paper is in the Einstein archives along with correspondence with Einstein about it. See Einstein on Peace (1960), edited by Otto Nathan. Einstein's four replies in the ensuing discussion were sold by Bloomsbury Auctions in October 2008. The lot description in the sales catalogue reads as follows:

84. Einstein (Albert, theoretical physicist, 1879-1955) 4 Typed Letters signed to Dr. Walter W. Marseille, in German, 4pp., 4to, Princeton, 8th April - 16th November 1948, responding to Marseille's paper “A Method to Enforce World Peace” and their subsequent correspondence on the establishment of world government and the Western world's relations with Russia, [Letter 1] (You proceed from these premises: The USA wants a supra-national organisation [World Government], the USSR is averse to this because of its aggressive attitude. I believe that this characterisation of the psychological state of affairs is not justified. Now to your proposal. We agree on the following: only World Government can produce security. Where we differ is in the thesis that we must compel Russia to join [a World Government] before it re-arms and can attack others. Better to let Russia see that there is nothing to be achieved by aggression, but there are advantages in joining: Then the Russian regime's attitude will probably change and they will take part without compulsion. Our differences of opinion are significant as long as it is uncertain whether the USA really wants to bring about a World Government... . Before this situation is resolved, your question should not even be raised, since such a discussion can only make the psychological situation worse) [Letter 2] (Factually your letter is entirely logical. However I cannot associate myself with your point of view, much less with that expressed by Bertrand Russell [who at this point was violently anti-communist]. Your train of thought is like that of a soldier or an engineer, in that you in my opinion unfeasably simplify the psychological reaction, especially insofar as it concerns the Russians. The attitude of the Russians, it seems to me, clearly shows that they are deeply concerned about the military-industrial situation, and that they would be prepared to make considerable concessions if some degree of relaxation was permitted. I am convinced that Roosevelt [Truman] is quite capable of bringing about a peaceful modus vivendi with Russia... ) [Letter 3] (I agree with you in that the resolution of the problem of security on an international basis cannot wait. In view of the resolute refusal of Russia, there seems no other possibility than that the organisation exist without Russia... . The question now arises whether such a 'Rump' World Government should compel Russia to join. This would mean war... with regard to this, I am not of your opinion. You argue that Russia's relative strength will grow in time and thereby worsen the situation for the rest of the world. This last is granted: I am, however, absolutely against it. It is like suicide out of fear of dying. In my view it is much better, both morally and practically, to attempt to bring about a state of affairs in which the Russians, out of pure self-interest, find it preferable to give up their separatist position) [Letter 4] (I propose that you should set out your views of the situation in a letter to the individual Trustees of the Emergency Committee of Atomic Scientists. As far as I am aware of their views, you will not find general agreement there but rather, unfortunately, with Bertrand Russell), last letter with small tear in margin; and 4 others including 3 typescript copies of Marseille's letters to Einstein expounding his opinions on World Government and Russia and a typescript, From Max Eastman: Excerpt from a conversation with Einstein, May, 1938, on Freud and Freudian ideas, pencil inscription at head: “From Max Eastman”, folds, browned, some with punch holes in left hand margins, some edges a little creased.

Marseille was the recipient of a well-known letter dated 5 May 1948 in which Bertrand Russell signalled his agreement with the paper. Russell's letter, of which Einstein may have been the first to have been sent a copy, was first published by Marseille in The Nation, 16 Oct. 1954, when he disagreed with Russell's changed views on nuclear disarmament. The letter and its lack of context have been of concern to Russell scholars.

By 1954 Marseilles was a Berkeley, California psychoanalyst. That year he contributed a series of radio broadcasts attempting a psychoanalytic study of Karl Marx. He published occasionally on nuclear weapons policy in the Bulletin of the Atomic Scientists, from 1954 until 1962.

== Works ==
- Review of a book on handwriting analysis, Psychosomatic Medicine 5 (1943): 317-318.
- Review of Harry Price's Fifty Years of Psychical Research in The Psychoanalytic Quarterly 12 (1943): 124-5
- 'Rules for a game of skill', Capture, April 26, 1943
- 'On Thermonuclear war', review essay, Bulletin of the Atomic Scientists, April 1961
- 'Marseille Replies', Bulletin of the Atomic Scientists, September 1961, p. 294
