= Edith Finch Russell =

American writer and biographer

- Born: Edith Finch; 5 November 1900
- Died: 1 January 1978 (aged 77)
- Education: Chapin School; Bryn Mawr College; St Hilda's College, Oxford
- Spouse: Bertrand Russell (m. 1952)

Edith Russell, Countess Russell (5 November 1900 – 1 January 1978; née Edith Finch) was an American writer and biographer. She was the fourth and last wife of Bertrand Russell.

== Biography ==
Finch was born to Edward Bronson Finch, a physician, and his wife, Delia. Raised in New York City, she graduated from Miss Chapin's School. She studied at Bryn Mawr College (A.B. 1922) and St Hilda's College, Oxford where she was awarded degrees in 1925 and 1926.

Finch was primarily an independent scholar but did teach English literature at Bryn Mawr College in the late 1920s. She traveled extensively in Europe in the 1930s and 1940s, while continuing to write and lecture. She published biographies of Wilfred Scawen Blunt in 1938 and M. Carey Thomas, a president of Bryn Mawr, in 1947.

Finch was Bertrand Russell's fourth and last wife. She first met Russell in the 1930s through her close friend and housemate Lucy Martin Donnelly, who was a friend of Russell's first wife, Alys. Finch moved to England in 1950 and married Russell in December 1952. By all accounts, it was a very happy marriage. The couple settled in Wales where Bertrand died in 1970. Edith died in 1978.

== Works ==
- Wilfrid Scawen Blunt, 1840–1922, 1938
- Carey Thomas of Bryn Mawr, 1947
- Strange Humanity. Original thoughts, 1954
