= Lucy Donnelly =

Lucy Martin Donnelly
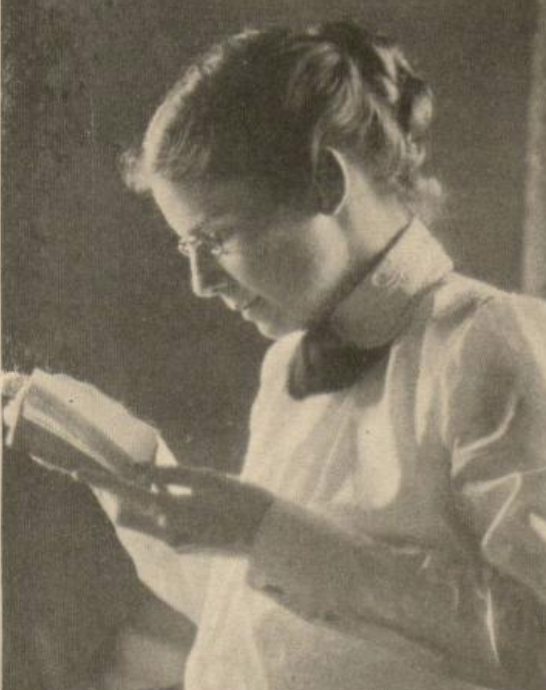
- Lucy Martin Donnelly, from the 1910 yearbook of Bryn Mawr College
- Born: September 18, 1870
- Died: August 3, 1948
- Occupation: Educator

Lucy Martin Donnelly (September 18, 1870 – August 3, 1948) was a teacher of English at Bryn Mawr College. She was head of the English department starting in 1914.

== Sources ==
- James, E. T, Wilson James, J. and Boyer, P. S. 1971, Notable American Women, 1607–1950: A Biographical Dictionary (Volume 2), p. 499
- Russell, B. and Griffin, N. 1992, The selected letters of Bertrand Russell, p. (vi) Lucy Donnelly (Bryn Mawr College Archives)
