= Philosophical views of Bertrand Russell =

Changing viewpoints of philosopher and mathematician Bertrand Russell (1872–1970)

The aspects of Bertrand Russell's views on philosophy cover the changing viewpoints of philosopher and mathematician Bertrand Russell (1872–1970), from his early writings in 1896 until his death in February 1970.

== Philosophical work ==
Russell is generally credited with being one of the founders of analytic philosophy, and he also produced a body of work that covers logic, the philosophy of mathematics, metaphysics, ethics and epistemology.

=== Analytic philosophy ===
Bertrand Russell helped to develop what is now called "Analytic Philosophy." Alongside G. E. Moore, Russell was shown to be partly responsible for the British revolt against idealism, a philosophy greatly influenced by G. W. F. Hegel and his British apostle, F. H. Bradley. This revolt was echoed 30 years later in Vienna by the logical positivists' "revolt against metaphysics." Russell was particularly critical of a doctrine he ascribed to idealism and coherentism, which he dubbed the doctrine of internal relations; this, Russell suggested, held that to know any particular thing, we must know all of its relations. Russell argued that this would make space, time, science and the concept of number not fully intelligible. Russell's logical work with Whitehead continued this project.

Russell and Moore were devoted to clarity in arguments by breaking down philosophical positions into their simplest components. Russell, in particular, saw formal logic and science as the principal tools of the philosopher. Russell did not think we should have separate methods for philosophy. Russell thought philosophers should strive to answer the most general of propositions about the world and this would help eliminate confusions. In particular, he wanted to end what he saw as the excesses of metaphysics. Russell adopted William of Ockham's principle against multiplying unnecessary entities, Occam's razor, as a central part of the method of analysis.

=== Logic and philosophy of mathematics ===
Russell had great influence on modern mathematical logic. The American philosopher and logician Willard Van Orman Quine said Russell's work represented the greatest influence on his own work.

Russell's first mathematical book, An Essay on the Foundations of Geometry, was published in 1897. This work was heavily influenced by Immanuel Kant. The book was highly praised but according to the author "far more in fact than it deserved". Russell later realised that the conception it laid out would make Albert Einstein's schema of space-time impossible. Thenceforth, he rejected the entire Kantian program as it related to mathematics and geometry, and rejected his own earliest work on the subject.

Interested in the definition of number, Russell studied the work of George Boole, Georg Cantor, and Augustus De Morgan. Materials in the Bertrand Russell Archives at McMaster University include notes of his reading in algebraic logic by Charles Sanders Peirce and Ernst Schröder. In 1900 he attended the first International Congress of Philosophy in Paris, where he became familiar with the work of the Italian mathematician, Giuseppe Peano. He mastered Peano's new symbolism and his set of axioms for arithmetic. Peano defined logically all of the terms of these axioms with the exception of 0, number, successor, and the singular term, the, which were the primitives of his system. Russell took it upon himself to find logical definitions for each of these. Between 1897 and 1903 he published several articles applying Peano's notation to the classical Boole-Schröder algebra of relations, among them On the Notion of Order, Sur la logique des relations avec les applications à la théorie des séries, and On Cardinal Numbers. He became convinced that the foundations of mathematics could be derived within what has since come to be called higher-order logic which in turn he believed to include some form of unrestricted comprehension axiom.

Russell then discovered that Gottlob Frege had independently arrived at equivalent definitions for 0, successor, and number, and the definition of number is now usually referred to as the Frege-Russell definition. Russell drew attention to Frege's priority in 1903, when he published The Principles of Mathematics (see below). The appendix to this work, however, described a paradox arising from Frege's application of second- and higher-order functions which took first-order functions as their arguments, and Russell offered his first effort to resolve what would henceforth come to be known as the Russell Paradox. Before writing Principles, Russell became aware of Cantor's proof that there was no greatest cardinal number, which Russell believed was mistaken. Cantor's paradox in turn was shown (for example by Crossley) to be a special case of the Russell Paradox. This caused Russell to analyse classes, for it was known that given any number of elements, the number of classes they result in is greater than their number. Russell's paradox involves the class of all classes, divided into two kinds: those classes that contain themselves, and those that do not. This class demonstrates a fatal flaw in the so-called principle of comprehension, which had been taken for granted by logicians of the time: it results in a contradiction, whereby Y is a member of Y if and only if Y is not a member of Y. Russell outlined a resolution of this paradox in an appendix to Principles, which he later developed into the theory of types. Aside from exposing a major inconsistency in naive set theory, Russell's work led directly to the creation of modern axiomatic set theory. It also crippled Frege's project of reducing arithmetic to logic. The Theory of Types and much of Russell's subsequent work have also found practical applications in computer science and information technology.

Russell continued to defend logicism, the view that mathematics is in some important sense reducible to logic, and along with his former teacher, Alfred North Whitehead, wrote the monumental Principia Mathematica, an axiomatic system on which all of mathematics can be built. The first volume of the Principia was published in 1910, and is largely ascribed to Russell. More than any other single work, it established the speciality of mathematical or symbolic logic. Two more volumes were published, but their original plan to incorporate geometry in a fourth volume was never realised, and Russell never felt up to improving the original works, though he referenced new developments and problems in his preface to the second edition. Upon completing the Principia, three volumes of extraordinarily abstract and complex reasoning, Russell was exhausted, and he felt his intellectual faculties never fully recovered from the effort. Although the Principia did not fall prey to the paradoxes in Frege's approach, it was later proven by Kurt Gödel that neither Principia Mathematica, nor any other consistent system of primitive recursive arithmetic, could decide the truth of every proposition by a proof or disproof within that system (see: Gödel's incompleteness theorem).

Russell's last significant work in mathematics and logic, Introduction to Mathematical Philosophy, was written while he was in jail for his anti-war activities during World War I. This was largely an explication of his previous work and its philosophical significance.

=== Philosophy of language ===
Russell made language, or more specifically, how we use language, a central part of philosophy, and this influenced Ludwig Wittgenstein, Gilbert Ryle, J. L. Austin, and P. F. Strawson, among others, who used many of the techniques that Russell originally developed. Russell, and G. E. Moore, argued that clarity of expression is a virtue.

A significant contribution to philosophy of language is Russell's theory of descriptions, set out in On Denoting (Mind, 1905). Frank Ramsey described this paper as "a paradigm of philosophy." The theory considers the sentence "The present King of France is bald" and whether the proposition is false or meaningless. Frege had argued, employing his distinction between sense and reference, that such sentences were meaningful but neither true nor false. Russell argues that the grammatical form of the sentence disguises its underlying logical form. Russell's Theory of Definite Descriptions enables the sentence to be construed as meaningful but false, without commitment to the existence of any present King of France. This addresses a paradox of great antiquity (e.g. "That which is not must in some sense be. Otherwise, how could we say of it that it is not?" etc.), going back at least as far as Parmenides. In Russell's own time, Meinong held the view of that-which-is-not being in some sense real; and Russell held this view prior to On Denoting.

The problem is general to what are called "definite descriptions." Normally this includes all terms beginning with "the," and sometimes includes names, like "Walter Scott." (This point is quite contentious: Russell sometimes thought that the latter terms shouldn't be called names at all, but only "disguised definite descriptions," but much subsequent work has treated them as altogether different things.) What is the "logical form" of definite descriptions: how, in Frege's terms, could we paraphrase them to show how the truth of the whole depends on the truths of the parts? Definite descriptions appear to be like names that by their very nature denote exactly one thing, neither more nor less. What, then, are we to say about the proposition as a whole if one of its parts apparently isn't functioning correctly?

Russell's solution was, first of all, to analyse not the term alone but the entire proposition that contained a definite description. "The present king of France is bald," he then suggested, can be reworded to "There is an x such that x is a present king of France, nothing other than x is a present king of France, and x is bald." Russell claimed that each definite description in fact contains a claim of existence and a claim of uniqueness which give this appearance, but these can be broken apart and treated separately from the predication that is the obvious content of the proposition. The proposition as a whole then says three things about some object: the definite description contains two of them, and the rest of the sentence contains the other. If the object does not exist, or if it is not unique, then the whole sentence turns out to be false, not meaningless.

One of the major complaints against Russell's theory, due originally to Strawson, is that definite descriptions do not claim that their object exists, they merely presuppose that it does.

Wittgenstein, Russell's student, achieved considerable prominence in the philosophy of language after the posthumous publication of the Philosophical Investigations. In Russell's opinion, Wittgenstein's later work was misguided, and he decried its influence and that of its followers (especially members of the so-called "Oxford school" of ordinary language philosophy, who he believed were promoting a kind of mysticism). He wrote a foreword to Ernest Gellner's Words and Things which was a fierce attack on the Oxford School of Ordinary Language philosophy and Wittgenstein's later work and was supportive of Gellner in the subsequent academic dispute. However, Russell still held Wittgenstein and his early work in high regard, he thought of him as, "perhaps the most perfect example I have ever known of genius as traditionally conceived, passionate, profound, intense, and dominating." Russell's belief that philosophy's task is not limited to examining ordinary language is once again widely accepted in philosophy.

=== Logical atomism ===
Russell explained his philosophy of logical atomism in a set of lectures, "The Philosophy of Logical Atomism", which he gave in 1918. In these lectures, Russell sets forth his concept of an ideal, isomorphic language, one that would mirror the world, whereby our knowledge can be reduced to terms of atomic propositions and their truth-functional compounds. Logical atomism is a form of radical empiricism, for Russell believed the most important requirement for such an ideal language is that every meaningful proposition must consist of terms referring directly to the objects with which we are acquainted, or that they are defined by other terms referring to objects with which we are acquainted. Russell excluded some formal, logical terms such as all, the, is, and so forth, from his isomorphic requirement, but he was never entirely satisfied with our understanding of such terms. One of the central themes of Russell's atomism is that the world consists of logically independent facts, a plurality of facts, and that our knowledge depends on the data of our direct experience of them. In his later life, Russell came to doubt aspects of logical atomism, especially his principle of isomorphism, though he continued to believe that the process of philosophy ought to consist of breaking things down into their simplest components, even though we might not ever fully arrive at an ultimate atomic fact.

=== Epistemology ===
Russell's epistemology went through many phases. Once he shed neo-Hegelianism in his early years, Russell remained a philosophical realist for the remainder of his life, believing that our direct experiences have primacy in the acquisition of knowledge. While some of his views have lost favour, his influence remains strong in the distinction between two ways in which we can be familiar with objects: "knowledge by acquaintance" and "knowledge by description". For a time, Russell thought that we could only be acquainted with our own sense data—momentary perceptions of colours, sounds, and the like—and that everything else, including the physical objects that these were sense data of, could only be inferred, or reasoned to—i.e. known by description—and not known directly. This distinction has gained much wider application, though Russell eventually rejected the idea of an intermediate sense datum.

In his later philosophy, Russell subscribed to a kind of neutral monism, maintaining that the distinctions between the material and mental worlds, in the final analysis, were arbitrary, and that both can be reduced to a neutral property—a view similar to one held by the American philosopher/psychologist, William James, and one that was first formulated by Baruch Spinoza, whom Russell greatly admired. Instead of James' "pure experience," however, Russell characterised the stuff of our initial states of perception as "events," a stance which is curiously akin to his old teacher Whitehead's process philosophy.

=== Philosophy of science ===
Russell claimed that he was more convinced of his method of doing philosophy than of his philosophical conclusions. Science was one of the principal components of analysis. Russell was a believer in the scientific method, that science reaches only tentative answers, that scientific progress is piecemeal, and attempts to find organic unities were largely futile. He believed the same was true of philosophy. Russell held that the ultimate objective of both science and philosophy was to understand reality, not simply to make predictions.

Russell's work contributed to philosophy of science's development into a separate branch of philosophy. Much of Russell's thinking about science is expressed in his 1914 book, Our Knowledge of the External World as a Field for Scientific Method in Philosophy, which influenced the logical positivists.

Russell held that of the physical world we know only its abstract structure except for the intrinsic character of our own brain with which we have direct acquaintance (Russell, 1948). Russell said that he had always assumed copunctuality between percepts and non-percepts, and percepts were also part of the physical world, a part of which we knew its intrinsic character directly, knowledge which goes beyond structure. His views on science have become integrated into the contemporary debate in the philosophy of science as a form of Structural Realism, people such as Elie Zahar and Ioannis Votsis have discussed the implications of his work for our understanding of science. The seminal article "The Concept of Structure in The Analysis of Matter" by William Demopoulos and Michael Friedman was crucial in reintegrating Russell's views to the contemporary scene.

Russell wrote several science books, including The ABC of Atoms (1923) and The ABC of Relativity (1925).

=== Ethics ===
While Russell wrote a great deal on ethical subject matters, he did not believe that the subject belonged to philosophy or that when he wrote on ethics that he did so in his capacity as a philosopher. In his earlier years, Russell was greatly influenced by G.E. Moore's Principia Ethica. Along with Moore, he then believed that moral facts were objective, but known only through intuition; that they were simple properties of objects, not equivalent (e.g., pleasure is good) to the natural objects to which they are often ascribed (see Naturalistic fallacy); and that these simple, undefinable moral properties cannot be analysed using the non-moral properties with which they are associated. In time, however, he came to agree with his philosophical hero, David Hume, who believed that ethical terms dealt with subjective values that cannot be verified in the same way as matters of fact.

Coupled with Russell's other doctrines, this influenced the logical positivists, who formulated the theory of emotivism or non-cognitivism, which states that ethical propositions (along with those of metaphysics) were essentially meaningless and nonsensical or, at best, little more than expressions of attitudes and preferences. Notwithstanding his influence on them, Russell himself did not construe ethical propositions as narrowly as the positivists, for he believed that ethical considerations are not only meaningful, but that they are a vital subject matter for civil discourse. Indeed, though Russell was often characterised as the patron saint of rationality, he agreed with Hume, who said that reason ought to be subordinate to ethical considerations.

In terms of his normative ethical beliefs, Russell considered himself a utilitarian early in his life.

=== Religion and theology ===
For most of his adult life Russell maintained that religion is little more than superstition and, despite any positive effects that religion might have, it is largely harmful to people. He believed religion and the religious outlook (he considered communism and other systematic ideologies to be forms of religion) serve to impede knowledge, foster fear and dependency, and are responsible for much of the war, oppression, and misery that have beset the world.

In his 1949 speech, "Am I an Atheist or an Agnostic?", Russell expressed his difficulty over whether to call himself an atheist or an agnostic:

As a philosopher, if I were speaking to a purely philosophic audience I should say that I ought to describe myself as an Agnostic, because I do not think that there is a conclusive argument by which one can prove that there is not a God. On the other hand, if I am to convey the right impression to the ordinary man in the street I think that I ought to say that I am an Atheist, because, when I say that I cannot prove that there is not a God, I ought to add equally that I cannot prove that there are not the Homeric gods.

— Bertrand Russell, Collected Papers, vol. 11, p. 91

In the 1948 BBC Radio Debate between Bertrand Russell and Frederick Copleston, Russell chose to assume the position of the agnostic. It seems to have been because he admitted to not being able to prove the non-existence of God:

Copleston: Well, my position is the affirmative position that such a being actually exists, and that His existence can be proved philosophically. Perhaps you would tell me if your position is that of agnosticism or of atheism. I mean, would you say that the non-existence of God can be proved?

Russell: No, I should not say that: my position is agnostic.

— Bertrand Russell v. Fr. Copleston, 1948 BBC Radio Debate on the Existence of God

Though he would later question God's existence, he fully accepted the ontological argument during his undergraduate years:

For two or three years...I was a Hegelian. I remember the exact moment during my fourth year [in 1894] when I became one. I had gone out to buy a tin of tobacco, and was going back with it along Trinity Lane, when I suddenly threw it up in the air and exclaimed: "Great God in Boots! – the ontological argument is sound!"

— Bertrand Russell, Autobiography of Bertrand Russell, pg. 60

This quote has been used by many theologians over the years, such as by Louis Pojman in his Philosophy of Religion, who wish for readers to believe that even a well-known atheist philosopher supported this particular argument for God's existence. However, elsewhere in his autobiography, Russell also mentions:

About two years later, I became convinced that there is no life after death, but I still believed in God, because the "First Cause" argument appeared to be irrefutable. At the age of eighteen, however, shortly before I went to Cambridge, I read Mill's Autobiography, where I found a sentence to the effect that his father taught him the question "Who made me?" cannot be answered, since it immediately suggests the further question "Who made God?" This led me to abandon the "First Cause" argument, and to become an atheist.

— Bertrand Russell, Autobiography of Bertrand Russell, pg. 36

Russell made an influential analysis of the omphalos hypothesis enunciated by Philip Henry Gosse—that any argument suggesting that the world was created as if it were already in motion could just as easily make it a few minutes old as a few thousand years:

There is no logical impossibility in the hypothesis that the world sprang into being five minutes ago, exactly as it then was, with a population that "remembered" a wholly unreal past. There is no logically necessary connection between events at different times; therefore nothing that is happening now or will happen in the future can disprove the hypothesis that the world began five minutes ago.

— Bertrand Russell, The Analysis of Mind, 1921, pp. 159–60; cf. Philosophy, Norton, 1927, p. 7, where Russell acknowledges Gosse's paternity of this anti-evolutionary argument.

As a young man, Russell had a decidedly religious bent, himself, as is evident in his early Platonism. He longed for eternal truths, as he makes clear in his famous essay, "A Free Man's Worship", widely regarded as a masterpiece of prose, but a work that Russell came to dislike. While he rejected the supernatural, he freely admitted that he yearned for a deeper meaning to life.

Russell's views on religion can be found in his book, Why I Am Not a Christian and Other Essays on Religion and Related Subjects. Its title essay was a talk given on 6 March 1927 at Battersea Town Hall, under the auspices of the South London Branch of the National Secular Society, UK, and published later that year as a pamphlet. The book also contains other essays in which Russell considers a number of logical arguments for the existence of God, including the first cause argument, the natural-law argument, the argument from design, and moral arguments. He also discusses specifics about Christian theology.

His conclusion:

Religion is based, I think, primarily and mainly upon fear. It is partly the terror of the unknown and partly, as I have said, the wish to feel that you have a kind of elder brother who will stand by you in all your troubles and disputes. [...] A good world needs knowledge, kindliness, and courage; it does not need a regretful hankering after the past or a fettering of the free intelligence by the words uttered long ago by ignorant men.

— Bertrand Russell, Why I Am Not a Christian and Other Essays on Religion and Related Subjects

== Influence on philosophy ==
As Nicholas Griffin points out in the introduction to The Cambridge Companion to Bertrand Russell, Russell had a major influence on modern philosophy, especially in the English-speaking world. While others were also influential, notably Frege, Moore, and Wittgenstein, Russell made analysis the dominant methodology of professional philosophy. The various analytic movements throughout the last century all owe something to Russell's earlier works. Even Russell's biographer, the philosopher Ray Monk, no admirer of Russell's personal snobbery, characterised his work on the philosophy of mathematics as intense, august and incontestably great and acknowledged, in the preface to the second volume of his biography, that he is one of the indisputably great philosophers of the twentieth century.

Russell's influence on individual philosophers is singular, especially in the case of Ludwig Wittgenstein, who was his student between 1911 and 1914.

Wittgenstein had an important influence on Russell as he himself discusses in his My Philosophical Development. He led him, for example, to conclude, much to his regret, that mathematical truths were purely tautological truths, however it is doubtful that Wittgenstein actually held this view, which he discussed in relation to logical truth, since it is not clear that he was a logicist when he wrote the Tractatus. What is certain is that in 1901 Russell's own reflections on the issues raised by the paradox that takes his name Russell's paradox, led him to doubt the intuitive certainty of mathematics. This doubt was perhaps Russell's most important 'influence' on mathematics, and was spread throughout the European universities, even as Russell himself laboured (with Alfred North Whitehead) in an attempt to solve the Paradox and related paradoxes, such as Burali-Forti. As Stewart Shapiro explains in his Thinking About Mathematics, Russell's attempts to solve the paradoxes led to the ramified theory of types, which, though it is highly complex and relies on the doubtful axiom of reducibility, actually manages to solve both syntactic and semantic paradoxes at the expense of rendering the logicist project suspect and introducing much complexity in the PM system. Philosopher and logician F.P. Ramsey would later simplify the theory of types arguing that there was no need to solve both semantic and syntactic paradoxes to provide a foundation for mathematics. The philosopher and logician George Boolos discusses the power of the PM system in the preface to his Logic, logic & logic, stating that it is powerful enough to derive most classical mathematics, equating the power of PM to that of Z, a weaker form of set theory than ZFC (Zermelo-Fraenkel Set theory with Choice). In fact, ZFC actually does circumvent Russell's paradox by restricting the comprehension axiom to already existing sets by the use of subset axioms.

Russell wrote (in Portraits from Memory, 1956) of his reaction to Gödel's 'Theorems of Undecidability':

I wanted certainty in the kind of way in which people want religious faith. I thought that certainty is more likely to be found in mathematics than elsewhere. But I discovered that many mathematical demonstrations, which my teachers wanted me to accept, were full of fallacies ... I was continually reminded of the fable about the elephant and the tortoise. Having constructed an elephant upon which the mathematical world could rest, I found the elephant tottering, and proceeded to construct a tortoise to keep the elephant from falling. But the tortoise was no more secure than the elephant, and after some twenty years of arduous toil, I came to the conclusion that there was nothing more that I could do in the way of making mathematical knowledge indubitable.

Evidence of Russell's influence on Wittgenstein can be seen throughout the Tractatus, which Russell was instrumental in having published. Russell also helped to secure Wittgenstein's doctorate and a faculty position at Cambridge, along with several fellowships along the way. However, as previously stated, he came to disagree with Wittgenstein's later linguistic and analytic approach to philosophy dismissing it as "trivial", while Wittgenstein came to think of Russell as "superficial and glib", particularly in his popular writings. However, Norman Malcolm tells us in his recollections of Wittgenstein that Wittgenstein showed a deference towards Russell such as he never saw him show towards anyone else, and even went so far as to reprimand students of his who criticised Russell. As Ray Monk relates in his biography of Wittgenstein, Wittgenstein used to say that Russell's books should be bound in two covers, those dealing with mathematical philosophy in blue, and every student of philosophy should read them, while those dealing with popular subjects should be bound in red and no one should be allowed to read them.

Russell's influence is also evident in the work of A. J. Ayer, Rudolf Carnap, Alonzo Church, Kurt Gödel, David Kaplan, Saul Kripke, Karl Popper, W. V. Quine, John R. Searle, and many other philosophers and logicians.

Russell often characterised his moral and political writings as lying outside the scope of philosophy, but Russell's admirers and detractors are often more acquainted with his pronouncements on social and political matters, or what some (e.g., biographer Ray Monk) have called his "journalism," than they are with his technical, philosophical work. There is a marked tendency to conflate these matters, and to judge Russell the philosopher on what he himself would definitely consider to be his non-philosophical opinions. Russell often cautioned people to make this distinction. Beginning in the 1920s, Russell wrote frequently for The Nation on changing morals, disarmament and literature. In 1965, he wrote that the magazine "...has been one of the few voices which has been heard on behalf of individual liberty and social justice consistently throughout its existence."

Russell left a large assortment of writing. From his adolescent years, he wrote about 3,000 words a day, with relatively few corrections; his first draft nearly always was his last, even on the most complex, technical matters. His previously unpublished work is an immense treasure trove, and scholars continue to gain new insights into Russell's thought.
