= Noneism =

Philosophical view

Noneism, also known as modal Meinongianism (named after Alexius Meinong), is a theory in logic and metaphysics. It holds that some things do not exist. It was coined by Richard Routley in 1980 and appropriated again in 2005 by Graham Priest.

== Overview ==
Noneism holds that some things do not exist. That is, we can quantify over non-existent objects ("items") using the so-called particular quantifier (also known—misleadingly in the view of noneists—as the existential quantifier). They also hold that "there is" is like "exist", rather than like the particular quantifier. Thus, they deny that there are things that do not exist. In this theory, there are no empty names, wherefore the "problem of empty names" that afflicts many theories about names (in particular, Millianism), is not a problem at all.

While Priest also espouses dialetheism, he maintains that his dialetheism is mostly capable of being separated from his noneism. The connection is that impossible objects may exist in impossible worlds, much as nonexistent objects may exist in possible (but not actual) worlds.

Richard Routley's book, Exploring Meinong's Jungle and Beyond: An Investigation of Noneism and the Theory of Items, was published in 1980, while the first edition of Priest's book entitled Towards Non-Being: The Logic and Metaphysics of Intentionality was published in 2005 (second revised edition in 2016).

== See also ==
- Abstract object theory
- Meinong's jungle
- Meinongianism
- Plato's beard
- Possible world
