= Nicholas Griffin (disambiguation) =

Nick Griffin (born 1959) is a British politician.

Nicholas or Nick Griffin may also refer to:

- Nick Griffin (comedian), American comedian
- Nicholas Griffin (philosopher), Canadian philosopher

== See also ==
- Nick Griffiths, Australian politician
- Nicholas Griffith, Welsh politician
- Nicola Griffith, British American writer
