= Sideroxylon (disambiguation) =

Sideroxylon is a Greek term meaning "iron wood" and may refer to:

- Sideroxylon, a genus of flowering plants in the family Sapotaceae
- Eucalyptus sideroxylon, also called Mugga, Red Ironbark or Mugga Ironbark, a small to medium-sized or occasionally tall Australian tree
- Sideroxylon (oxymoron), a type of oxymoron
- Occasionally used for petrified wood
- A 1983 album by The Celibate Rifles
