= Nonexistent objects =

Philosophical treatment of oxymorons

In metaphysics and ontology, nonexistent objects are a concept advanced by Austrian philosopher Alexius Meinong in the 19th and 20th centuries within a "theory of objects". He was interested in intentional states which are directed at nonexistent objects. Starting with the "principle of intentionality", mental phenomena are intentionally directed towards an object. People may imagine, desire or fear something that does not exist. Other philosophers concluded that intentionality is not a real relation and therefore does not require the existence of an object, while Meinong concluded there is an object for every mental state whatsoever—if not an existent then at least a nonexistent one.

== Round square copula ==
The round square copula is a common example of the dual copula strategy used in reference to the "problem of nonexistent objects" as well as their relation to problems in modern philosophy of language.

The issue arose, most notably, between the theories of contemporary philosophers Alexius Meinong (see Meinong's 1904 book Investigations in Theory of Objects and Psychology) and Bertrand Russell (see Russell's 1905 article "On Denoting"). Russell's critique of Meinong's theory of objects, also known as the Russellian view, became the established view on the problem of nonexistent objects.

In late modern philosophy, the concept of the "square circle" (German: viereckiger Kreis) had also been discussed before in Gottlob Frege's The Foundations of Arithmetic (1884).

=== The dual copula strategy ===
The strategy employed is the dual copula strategy, also known as the dual predication approach, which is used to make a distinction between relations of properties and individuals. It entails creating a sentence that is not supposed to make sense by forcing the term "is" into ambiguous meaning.

The dual copula strategy was originally brought to prominence in contemporary philosophy by Ernst Mally. Other proponents of this approach include: Héctor-Neri Castañeda, William J. Rapaport, and Edward N. Zalta.

By borrowing Zalta's notational method (Fb stands for b exemplifies the property of being F; bF stands for b encodes the property of being F), and using a revised version of Meinongian object theory which makes use of a dual copula distinction (MOT^{dc}), we can say that the object called "the round square" encodes the property of being round, the property of being square, all properties implied by these, and no others. But it is true that there are also infinitely many properties being exemplified by an object called the round square (and, really, any object)—e.g. the property of not being a computer, and the property of not being a pyramid. Note that this strategy has forced "is" to abandon its predicative use, and now functions abstractly.

When one now analyzes the round square copula using the MOT^{dc}, one will find that it now avoids the three common paradoxes: (1) The violation of the law of noncontradiction, (2) The paradox of claiming the property of existence without actually existing, and (3) producing counterintuitive consequences. Firstly, the MOT^{dc} shows that the round square does not exemplify the property of being round, but the property of being round and square. Thus, there is no subsequent contradiction. Secondly, it avoids the conflict of existence/non-existence by claiming non-physical existence: by the MOT^{dc}, it can only be said that the round square simply does not exemplify the property of occupying a region in space. Finally, the MOT^{dc} avoids counterintuitive consequences (like a 'thing' having the property of nonexistence) by stressing that the round square copula can be said merely to encode the property of being round and square, not actually exemplifying it. Thus, logically, it does not belong to any set or class.

In the end, what the MOT^{dc} really does is create a kind of object: a nonexistent object that is very different from the objects we might normally think of. Occasionally, references to this notion, while obscure, may be called "Meinongian objects."

=== The dual property strategy ===
Making use of the notion of "non-physically existent" objects is controversial in philosophy, and created the buzz for many articles and books on the subject during the first half of the 20th century. There are other strategies for avoiding the problems of Meinong's theories, but they suffer from serious problems as well.

First is the dual property strategy, also known as the nuclear–extranuclear strategy.

Mally introduced the dual property strategy, but did not endorse it. The dual property strategy was eventually adopted by Meinong. Other proponents of this approach include: Terence Parsons and Richard Routley.

According to Meinong, it is possible to distinguish the natural (nuclear) properties of an object, from its external (extranuclear) properties. Parsons identifies four types of extranuclear properties: ontological, modal, intentional, technical—however, philosophers dispute Parson's claims in number and kind. Additionally, Meinong states that nuclear properties are either constitutive or consecutive, meaning properties that are either explicitly contained or implied/included in a description of the object. Essentially the strategy denies the possibility for objects to have only one property, and instead they may have only one nuclear property. Meinong himself, however, found this solution to be inadequate in several ways and its inclusion only served to muddle the definition of an object.

=== The other worlds strategy ===
There is also the other worlds strategy. Similar to the ideas explained with possible worlds theory, this strategy employs the view that logical principles and the law of contradiction have limits, but without assuming that everything is true. Enumerated and championed by Graham Priest, who was heavily influenced by Routley, this strategy forms the notion of "noneism". In short, assuming there exist infinite possible and impossible worlds, objects are freed from necessarily existing in all worlds, but instead may exist in impossible worlds (where the law of contradiction does not apply, for example) and not in the actual world. Unfortunately, accepting this strategy entails accepting the host of problems that come with it, such as the ontological status of impossible worlds.

== Meinong's jungle ==
Meinong's jungle is a term used to describe the repository of non-existent objects in the ontology of Alexius Meinong. An example of such an object is a "round square", which cannot exist definitionally and yet can be the subject of logical inferences, such as that it is both "round" and "square".

Meinong, an Austrian philosopher active at the turn of the 20th century, believed that since non-existent things could apparently be referred to, they must have some sort of being, which he termed sosein ("being so"). A unicorn and a pegasus are both non-being; yet it is true that unicorns have horns and pegasi have wings. Thus non-existent things like unicorns, square circles, and golden mountains can have different properties, and must have a 'being such-and-such' even though they lack 'being' proper. The strangeness of such entities led to this ontological realm being referred to as "Meinong's jungle". The jungle is described in Meinong's work Über Annahmen (1902). The name is credited to William C. Kneale, whose Probability and Induction (1949) includes the passage "after wandering in Meinong's jungle of subsistence ... philosophers are now agreed that propositions cannot be regarded as ultimate entities".

The Meinongian theory of objects (Gegenstandstheorie) was influential in the debate over sense and reference between Gottlob Frege and Bertrand Russell which led to the establishment of analytic philosophy and contemporary philosophy of language. Russell's theory of descriptions, in the words of P. M. S. Hacker, enables him to "thin out the luxuriant Meinongian jungle of entities (such as the round square), which, it had appeared, must in some sense subsist in order to be talked about". According to the theory of descriptions, speakers are not committed to asserting the existence of referents for the names they use.

Meinong's jungle is cited as an objection to Meinong's semantics, as the latter commits one to ontically undesirable objects; it is desirable to be able to speak meaningfully about unicorns, the objection goes, but not to have to believe in them. Nominalists (who believe that general or abstract terms and predicates exist but that either universals or abstract objects do not) find Meinong's jungle particularly unpalatable. As Colin McGinn puts it, "[g]oing naively by the linguistic appearances leads not only to logical impasse but also to metaphysical extravagance—as with Meinong's jungle, infested with shadowy Being." An uneasiness with the ontological commitments of Meinong's theory is commonly expressed in the bon mot "we should cut back Meinong's jungle with Occam's razor".

Meinong's jungle was defended by modal realists, whose possible world semantics offered a more palatable variation of Meinong's Gegenstandstheorie, as Jaakko Hintikka explains:

If you ask "Where are the non-existent objects?" the answer is, "Each in its own possible world." The only trouble with that notorious thicket, Meinong's jungle, is that it has not been zoned, plotted and divided into manageable lots, better known as possible worlds.

— Hintikka, Jaakko, The Logic of Epistemology and the Epistemology of Logic, p. 40.

However, modal realists retain the problem of explaining reference to impossible objects such as square circles. For Meinong, such objects simply have a 'being so' that precludes their having ordinary 'being'. But this entails that 'being so' in Meinong's sense is not equivalent to existing in a possible world.

== See also ==
- Abstract object theory
- Empty name, a name without a referent
- Extended modal realism
- Fictionalism, a theory which holds that one can talk about fictional objects without being committed to their existence
- Meontology
- Modal realism
- Noneism, the philosophical belief that there are things that do not exist
- Nonexistence
- Object of the mind
- Plato's beard
- Platonic realism
- Theory of descriptions
- Wooden iron

== Sources ==
- Routley, Richard (1980). Exploring Meinong's Jungle and Beyond. Departmental Monograph #3, Department of Philosophy, RSSS, Australian National University.
- Priest, Graham (2016). Towards Non-Being: The Logic and Metaphysics of Intentionality. Second edition. Oxford: Clarendon. ISBN 978-0198783602.
- Crittenden, Charles (1991). Unreality: The Metaphysics of Fictional Objects. Ithaca: Cornell University Press. ISBN 0-8014-2520-4.
- Jacquette, Dale (1997). Meinongian Logic: the Semantics of Existence and Nonexistence. Berlin: Walter de Gruyter. ISBN 3-11-014865-X.
- Zalta, Edward N. (1983). Abstract Objects: An Introduction to Axiomatic Metaphysics. Synthese Library. Vol. 160. Dordrecht, Netherlands: D. Reidel Publishing Company. ISBN 978-90-277-1474-9.
