= Terence Parsons =

American philosopher (1939–2022)

- Born: Terence Dwight Parsons; July 26, 1939; Endicott, New York, U.S.
- Died: 2022 (aged 82–83)

Education
- Education: University of Rochester (B.A.); Stanford University (Ph.D., 1966)
- Thesis: The Elimination of Individual Concepts (1966)
- Doctoral advisor: Jaakko Hintikka

Philosophical work
- Era: Contemporary philosophy
- Region: Western philosophy
- School: Analytic philosophy Neo-Meinongianism
- Institutions: University of California, Los Angeles; University of California, Irvine; University of Massachusetts Amherst; University of Illinois Chicago
- Doctoral students: Jim Waldo; Edward N. Zalta
- Main interests: Philosophy of language, metaphysics
- Notable ideas: Nonexistent objects Dual property strategy

Terence Dwight Parsons (July 26, 1939 – 2022) was an American philosopher, specializing in philosophy of language and metaphysics. He was emeritus professor of philosophy at UCLA.

== Life and career ==
Parsons was born in Endicott, New York and graduated from the University of Rochester with a BA in physics. He received his PhD from Stanford University in 1966. He was a full-time faculty member at the University of Illinois Chicago from 1965 to 1972, at the University of Massachusetts Amherst from 1972 to 1979, at the University of California, Irvine from 1979 to 2000, and at the University of California, Los Angeles from 2000 to 2012. In 2007, he was elected to the American Academy of Arts and Sciences.

Parsons died in 2022 at the age of 82 or 83.

== Philosophical work ==
Parsons worked on the semantics of natural language to develop theories of truth and meaning for natural language similar to those devised for artificial languages by philosophical logicians. Heavily influenced by Alexius Meinong, he wrote Nonexistent Objects (1980), which dealt with possible world theory in order to defend the reality of nonexistent objects.

== Works ==
- Nonexistent Objects, Yale University Press, 1980.
- Events in the Semantics of English, MIT Press, 1990.
- Indeterminate Identity, Oxford University Press, 2000.
- Articulating Medieval Logic, Oxford University Press, 2014.

== See also ==
- Round square copula
