= Empty name =

Concept in the philosophy of language

In metaphysics and the philosophy of language, an empty name is a proper name that has no referent.

The problem of empty names is the idea that empty names have a meaning when it seems they should not. The name "Pegasus" is empty; there is nothing to which it refers. Yet, though there is no Pegasus, we know what the sentence "Pegasus has two wings" means. We can even understand the sentence "There is no such thing as Pegasus." But, what can the meaning of a proper name be, except the object to which it refers?

== Overview ==
There are three broad ways which philosophers have tried to approach this problem.

1. The meaning of a proper name is not the same as the object (if there is any) it refers to. Hence, though "Pegasus" refers to nothing, it still has a meaning. The German philosopher Gottlob Frege seems to have held a theory of this sort. He says that the sentence "'Odysseus was set ashore at Ithaca while sound asleep' obviously has a sense. ...the thought [expressed by that sentence] remains the same whether 'Odysseus' has reference or not." Bertrand Russell may also have held a similar theory, that a proper name is a disguised definite description that signifies some unique characteristic. If any object has this characteristic feature, the name has a referent. Otherwise it is empty. Perhaps "Aristotle" means "the teacher of Alexander". Since there was such a person, "Aristotle" refers to that person. By contrast, "Pegasus" may mean "the winged horse of Bellerophon". Since there was no such horse, the name has no referent. This is the so-called description theory of names. The difficulty with this account is that we may always use a proper name to deny that the individual bearing the name actually has some characteristic feature. So, we can meaningfully say that Aristotle was not the teacher of Alexander. But if "Aristotle" means "teacher of Alexander", it would follow that this assertion is self-contradictory, which it is not. Saul Kripke proposed this argument in a series of influential papers in the 1970s. Another difficulty is that different people may have different ideas about the defining characteristics of any individual. Yet we all understand what the name means. The sole information carried by the name seems to be the identity of the individual that it belongs to. This information therefore cannot be descriptive, it cannot describe the individual. As John Stuart Mill argued, a proper name tells us the identity of its bearer, without telling us anything else about it. Naming is rather like pointing.
2. A theory that became influential following Kripke's attack is that empty proper names, have, strictly speaking, no meaning. This is the so-called direct-reference theory. Versions of this theory have been defended by Keith Donnellan, David Kaplan, Nathan Salmon, Scott Soames and others. The problem with the direct-reference theory is that names appear to be meaningful independently of whether they are empty. Furthermore, negative existential statements using empty names are both true and apparently meaningful. How can "Pegasus does not exist" be true if the name "Pegasus", as used in that sentence, has no meaning?
3. There are no empty names. All names have a referent. The difficulty with this theory is how to distinguish names like "Pegasus" from names like "Aristotle". Any coherent account of this distinction seems to require that there are objects that do not exist. Given that "Pegasus does not exist" is true, it follows that the referent of "Pegasus" does not exist. Hence there is something—the referent of "Pegasus"—that does not exist. Some philosophers, such as Alexius Meinong have argued that there are two senses of the verb "exists", exemplified by the sentence "there are things that do not exist". The first, signified by "there are", is the so-called "wide sense", including Pegasus, the golden mountain, the round square, and so on. The second, signified by "exist" is the so-called "narrow sense", encompassing only things that are real or existent.

== Fictional entities ==
Some philosophers employ the related concepts of "fictional entities" (such as Sherlock Holmes) who are deliberate inventions, and of "mythical entities" (such as Vulcan) that result from accidental mistakes. Such entities appear to be employed in many different contexts:

- Discourse within fiction: The story itself saying that "[Holmes was] the most perfect reasoning and observing machine"
- Intra-fictional discourse by readers: "Holmes solved his first mystery while in college"
- Inter-fictional discourse by readers: "Holmes is even smarter than Batman"
- Nonexistence claims: "Sherlock Holmes does not exist"
- Discourse about the entity as a fictional entity: "Holmes is a fictional character"

== See also ==
- Meinong's jungle
- Meta-ontology
- Nonexistent objects
- Ontological commitment
- Plato's beard
- Round square copula
