= Val Plumwood =

Australian philosopher (1939–2008)

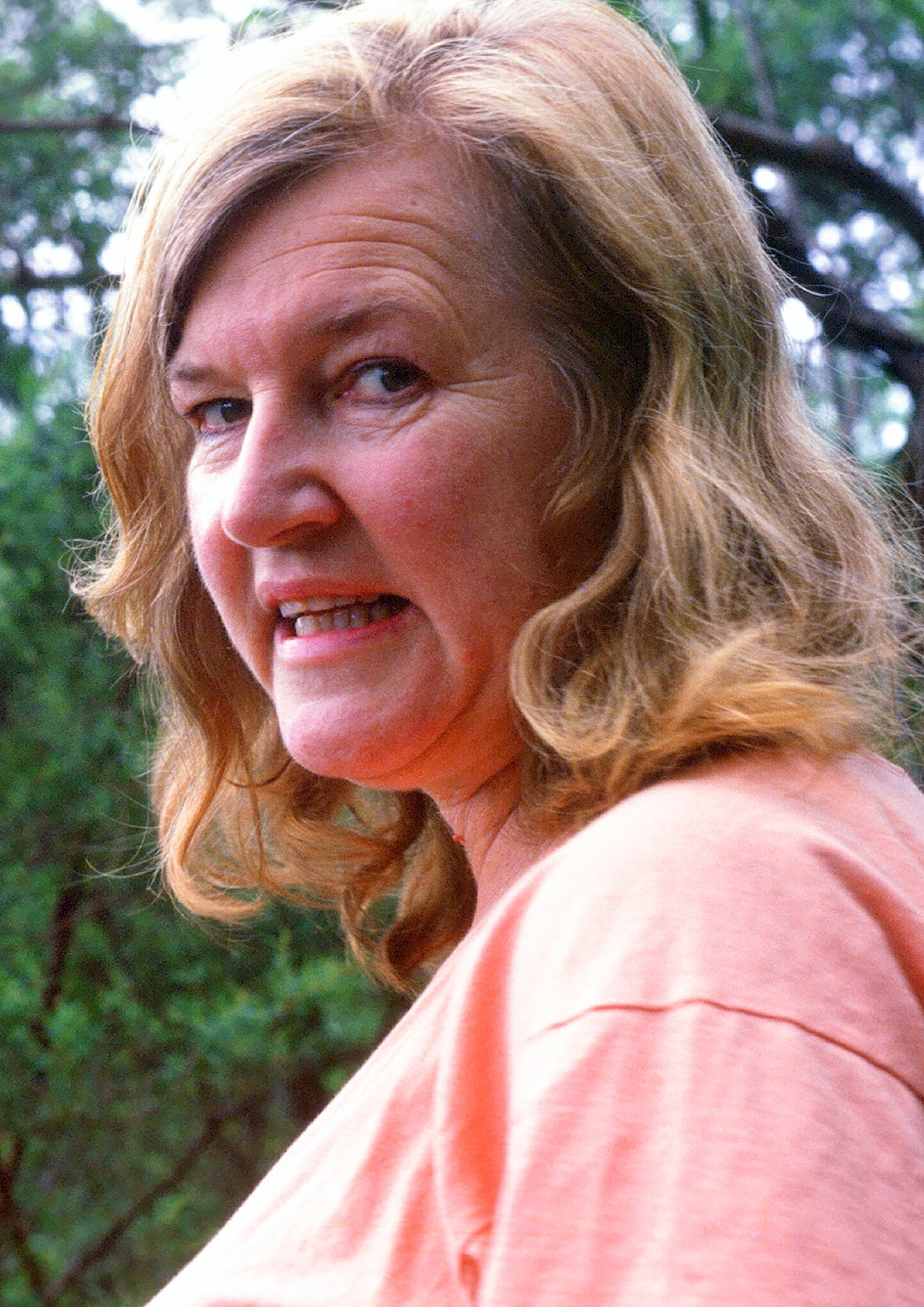
- Plumwood in 1990
- Born: Val Morell; 11 August 1939; Terrey Hills, Australia
- Died: 29 February 2008 (aged 68); Braidwood, Australia
- Other name: Val Routley
- Education: BA (Hons), philosophy, University of Sydney (1965); MA, logic, University of New England (c. 1966); PhD, philosophy, Australian National University (1991)
- Thesis: Women of the Mysterious Forest: Women, Nature, and Philosophy, an Exploration of Self and Gender in Relation to Traditional Dualisms in Western Culture
- Known for: Ecofeminism
- Notable work: Feminism and the Mastery of Nature (1993)
- Movement: Ecological humanities, ecosophy
- Spouse(s): John Macrae; Richard Sylvan

Val Plumwood (11 August 1939 – 29 February 2008) was an Australian philosopher and ecofeminist known for her work on anthropocentrism. From the 1970s, she played a central role in the development of radical ecosophy. Working mostly as an independent scholar, she held positions at the University of Tasmania, North Carolina State University, the University of Montana, and the University of Sydney, and at the time of her death was Australian Research Council Fellow at the Australian National University. She is included in Routledge's Fifty Key Thinkers on the Environment (2001).

Plumwood spent her academic life arguing against the "hyperseparation" of humans from the rest of nature and what she called the "standpoint of mastery"; a reason/nature dualism in which the natural world—including women, indigenous people, and non-humans—is subordinated.

Between 1972 and 2012, she authored or co-authored four books and over 100 papers on logic, metaphysics, the environment, and ecofeminism. Her Feminism and the Mastery of Nature (1993) is regarded as a classic, and her Environmental Culture: The Ecological Crisis of Reason (2002) was said to have marked her as "one of the most brilliant environmental thinkers of our time". The Fight for the Forests (1973), co-authored with the philosopher Richard Sylvan, Plumwood's second husband, was described in 2014 as the most comprehensive analysis of Australian forestry to date.

Plumwood's posthumously published The Eye of the Crocodile (2012) emerged from her survival of a saltwater crocodile attack in 1985, first described in her essay "Being Prey" (1996). The experience offered her a glimpse of the world "from the outside", a "Heraclitean universe" in which she was food like any other creature. It was a world that was indifferent to her and would continue without her, where "being in your body is—like having a volume out from the library, a volume subject to more or less instant recall by other borrowers—who rewrite the whole story when they get it".

== Early life and education ==
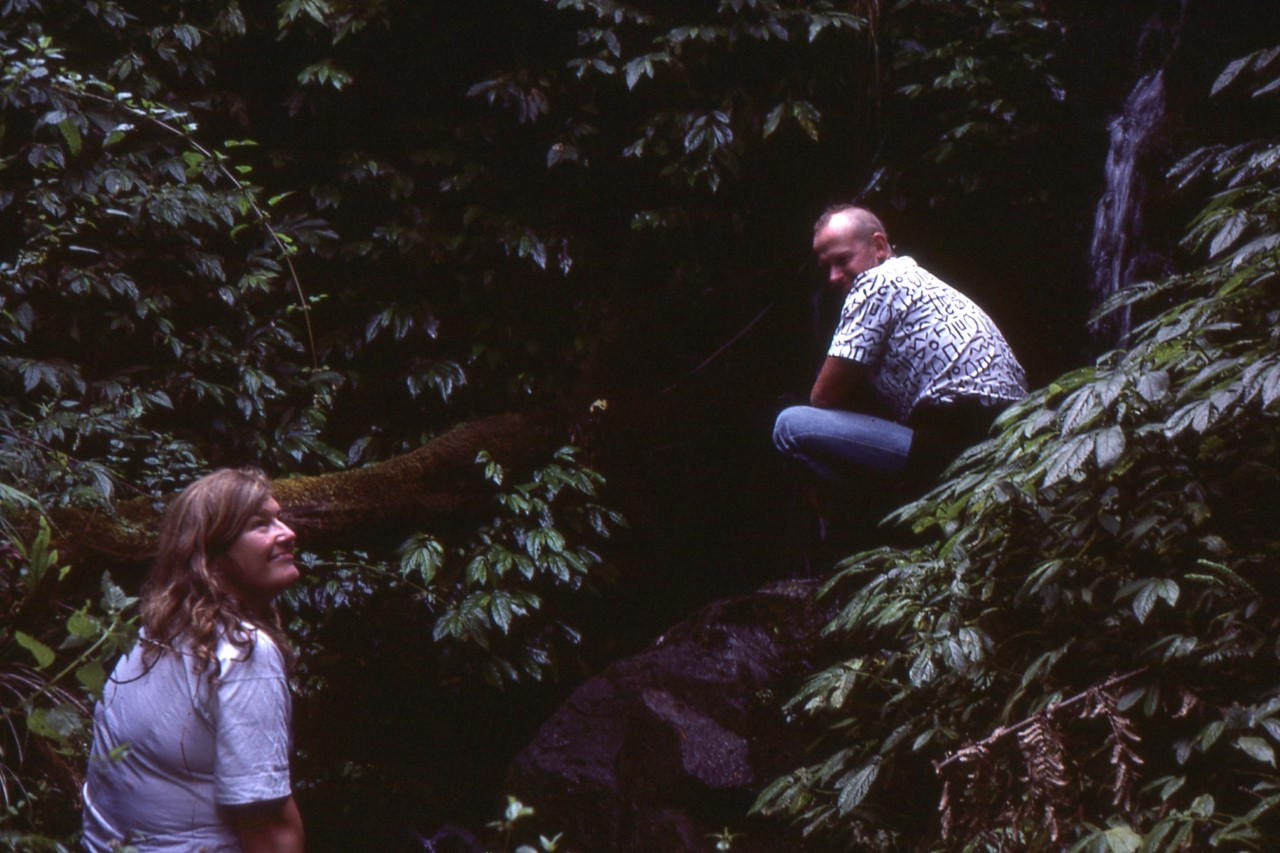
Plumwood and Sean Kenan, 1987

Plumwood was born Val Morell to parents whose home was a shack with walls made of hessian sacks dipped in cement. After obtaining a land grant, her parents had set up home in the Terrey Hills, near the Ku-ring-gai Chase National Park, north of Sydney. Her father worked at first as a hod carrier, then started a small poultry farm. According to Martin Mulligan and Stuart Hill, the beauty of the area made up for Plumwood's lack of toys.

The poultry farm failed, and when she was ten the family moved to Collaroy, another northern Sydney suburb, where her father found work in the civil service. They moved again to Kogarah in southern Sydney. Plumwood attended St George Girls High School in Kogarah, where she was dux of the school. Offered a Commonwealth Scholarship to attend the University of Sydney, she turned it down for a Teacher's Scholarship instead, also at Sydney—her parents wanted her to do something practical—although she soon became interested in philosophy.

Plumwood's studies were interrupted in 1958 by her brief marriage to a fellow student, John Macrae, when she was 18 and pregnant, a marriage that had ended in divorce by the time Plumwood was 21. The couple had two children, both of whom died young. Their son, John Macrae, was born when Plumwood was 19 and died in 1988 after an illness. Their daughter, Caitlin Macrae, born in 1960 and given up for adoption when she was 18 months old, was murdered in her teens. Plumwood resumed her studies at Sydney in 1962, this time with a Commonwealth Scholarship to study philosophy, and graduated with first-class honours in 1964.

== Personal life and activism ==
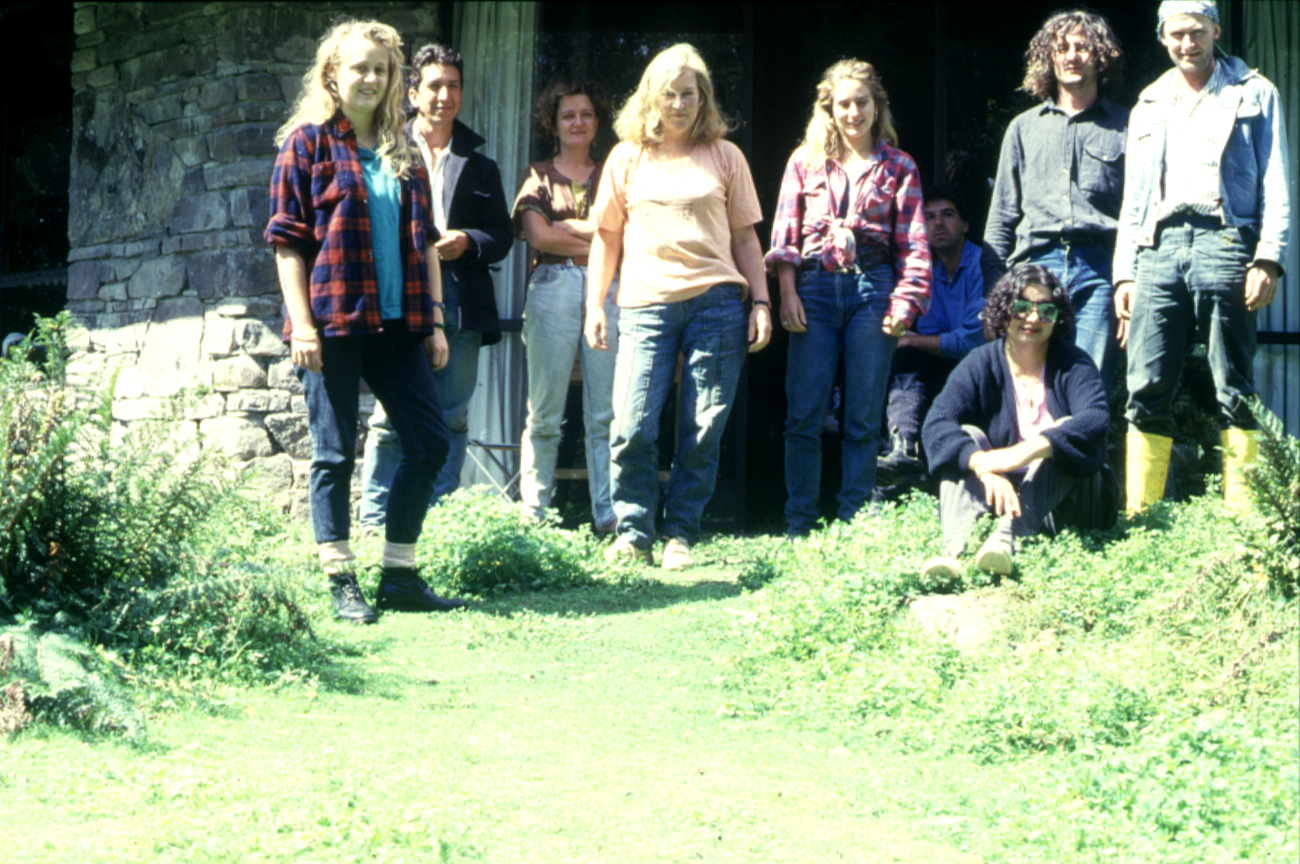
Plumwood, fourth from the left, 2004, at the home she built with Richard Sylvan near Plumwood Mountain

Soon after commencing postgraduate studies in Logic at UNE in Armidale, Plumwood married the philosopher Richard Sylvan (then known as Richard Routley), whom she had met while in Sydney, and changed her name to Val Routley. They spent time travelling in the Middle East and UK, which included living near a beech forest in Scotland for a year. Returning to Australia, they became active in movements to preserve biodiversity and halt deforestation, and helped establish the trans-discipline known as ecological humanities. Referred to as Routley and Routley, from 1973 to 1982 they co-authored several notable papers on logic and the environment, becoming central figures in the debate about anthropocentrism or "human chauvinism". Together they wrote the influential book The Fight for the Forests (1973), which analysed the damaging policies of the forestry industry in Australia. The demand for the book saw three editions published in three years.

Commencing in 1975 the couple spent several years building their home near Plumwood Mountain on the coast, 75 km from Canberra, an octagonal stone house on a 120-hectare clearing in a rainforest. They divorced in 1981. Plumwood continued living in the house and changed her name again after the divorce, this time naming herself after the mountain, which in turn is named after the Eucryphia moorei tree. Routley changed his surname to Sylvan ("of the forest") when he remarried in 1983; he died in 1996.

Plumwood held positions at the University of Tasmania, North Carolina State University, the University of Montana, and the University of Sydney. At the time of her death, she was Australian Research Council Fellow at the Australian National University. She was found dead on 1 March 2008 in the house she had built with Sylvan; she is believed to have died the previous day, after suffering a stroke.

== Views ==
=== Human/nature dualism ===
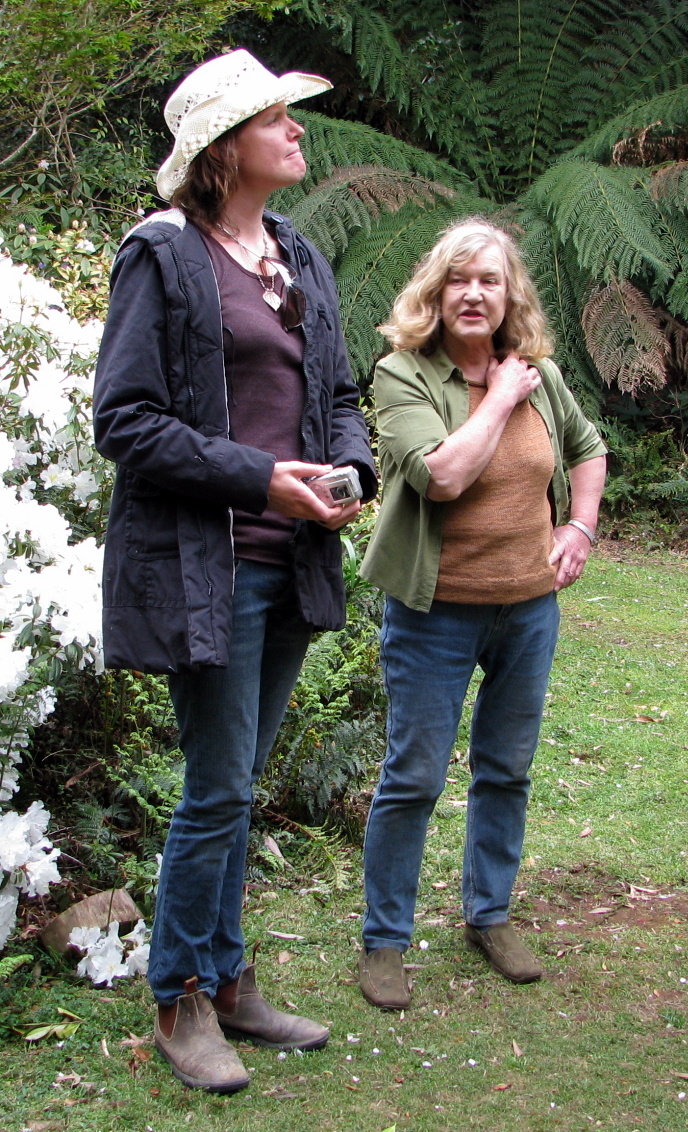
Plumwood (right) and Sky Kidd, 2007

Plumwood's major theoretical works are her Feminism and the Mastery of Nature (1993) and her Environmental Culture: the Ecological Crisis of Reason (2002). She critiqued what she called "the standpoint of mastery", a set of views of the self and its relationship to the other associated with sexism, racism, capitalism, colonialism, and the domination of nature. This set of views, she argued, involves "seeing the other as radically separate and inferior, the background to the self as foreground, as one whose existence is secondary, derivative or peripheral to that of the self or center, and whose agency is denied or minimized."

She identified human/nature dualism as one of a series of gendered dualisms, including "human/animal, mind/body ... male/female, reason/emotion, [and] civilized/primitive", and argued for their abandonment, as well as that of the Western notion of a rational, unitary, Cartesian self, in favour of an ecological ethic based on empathy for the other. In doing so, she rejected not only the "hyperseparation" between self and other, and between humanity and nature, but also postmodern alternatives based on a respect for absolute difference and deep ecological alternatives based on a merging of the self and the world. Instead, she proposed a view that recognises and grounds ethical responsibility in the continuities and divisions between subject and object, and between people and the environment.

Plumwood was a vegetarian, her affirmation of the ecological significance of predation notwithstanding, on account of her objection to factory farming. She advocated a semi-vegetarian position she labelled Ecological Animalism, in opposition to the animal rights platform of Carol J. Adams, which Plumwood called ontological veganism and which she criticised for its endorsement of human/nature dualism.

=== Crocodile attack ===
In "Human vulnerability and the experience of being prey" (1995), Plumwood describes how she survived an attack by a saltwater crocodile on 19 February 1985, and the radical change this experience brought about in her view of the world, from what she called the "individual justice universe", where humans are always the predators, to the "Heraclitean universe", where we are just another part of the food chain. During a visit to Kakadu National Park, Plumwood had camped at the East Alligator ranger station and borrowed a four-metre-long fibreglass canoe from Greg Miles, the park ranger, to explore the East Alligator Lagoon.

When I pulled my canoe over in driving rain to a rock outcrop rising out of the swamp for a hasty, sodden lunch, I experienced the unfamiliar sensation of being watched. Having never been one for timidity, in philosophy or in life, I decided, rather than return defeated to my sticky caravan, to explore a clear, deep channel closer to the river I had travelled along the previous day. ... I had not gone more than five or ten minutes back down the channel when, rounding a bend, I saw ahead of me in midstream what looked like a floating stick – one I did not recall passing on my way up. As the current moved me toward it, the stick appeared to develop eyes.

External images

Plumwood's canoe
Artist's rendition of Plumwood in the crocodile's jaws

Crocodiles do not often attack canoes, but this one started lashing at it with his tail. Plumwood grabbed some overhanging branches, but before she could pull herself up, the crocodile seized her between the legs and dragged her under the water, a "centrifuge of whirling, boiling blackness, which seemed about to tear my limbs from my body, driving waters into my bursting lungs."

The crocodile briefly let her go, then seized her again, subjecting her to three such "death rolls" before she managed to escape up a steep mud bank. Despite severe injuries – her left leg was exposed to the bone, and she found later that she had contracted melioidosis – she began walking, then crawling, the three kilometres to the ranger station. The park ranger had gone searching for her when she failed to return by nightfall and heard her shout for help. She underwent a 13-hour trip to the hospital in Darwin, where she spent a month in intensive care followed by extensive skin grafts. The canoe is now in the National Museum of Australia.

The experience gave Plumwood a glimpse of the world "from the outside", a world that was indifferent to her and would continue without her: "an unrecognisably bleak order" – "As my own narrative and the larger story were ripped apart, I glimpsed a shockingly indifferent world in which I had no more significance than any other edible being. The thought This can't be happening to me, I'm a human being. I am more than just food! was one component of my terminal incredulity. It was a shocking reduction, from a complex human being to a mere piece of meat. Reflection has persuaded me that not just humans but any creature can make the same claim to be more than just food. We are edible, but we are also much more than edible." (Note: Val Plumwood, 2012: "This was a strong sense, at the moment of being grabbed by those powerful jaws, that there was something profoundly and incredibly wrong in what was happening, some sort of mistaken identity. My disbelief was not just existential but ethical—this wasn’t happening, couldn’t be happening. The world was not like that! The creature was breaking the rules, was totally mistaken, utterly wrong to think I could be reduced to food. As a human being, I was so much more than food. It was a denial of, an insult to all I was to reduce me to food. Were all the other facets of my being to be sacrificed to this utterly undiscriminating use, was my complex organisation to be destroyed so I could be reassembled as part of this other being? With indignation as well as disbelief, I rejected this event. It was an illusion! It was not only unjust but unreal! It couldn’t be happening. After much later reflection, I came to see that there was another way to look at it. There was illusion alright, but it was the other way around. It was the world of ‘normal experience’ that was the illusion, and the newly disclosed brute world in which I was prey was, in fact, the unsuspected reality, or at least a crucial part of it.") She argued that our anthropocentric view, the "individual justice universe", is disconnected from reality:

[I]n the individual justice universe the individual subject's universe is like the person-as-the-walled-moated-castle-town. It is under constant siege and desperately, obsessively seeking to keep the body—this body made out of food—away from others and retain it for ourselves alone. Of course we know the walled-moated castle will fall in the end but we try to hold off the siege as long as possible while seeking always more and better siege-resisting technology that will enable us to remain self-enclosed.

In the individual/justice universe you own the energy volume of your body absolutely and spend much of that energy defending it frantically against all comers. Any attempt by others at sharing is regarded as an outrage, an injustice, that must be resisted to the hilt (consider our reaction to the overfamiliar gatecrashers at our high-class feast—mosquitoes, leeches, ticks. These outrage our proprietary sensibilities). In the other, Heraclitean universe, being in your body is more like having a volume out from the library, a volume subject to more or less instant recall by other borrowers—who rewrite the whole story when they get it.

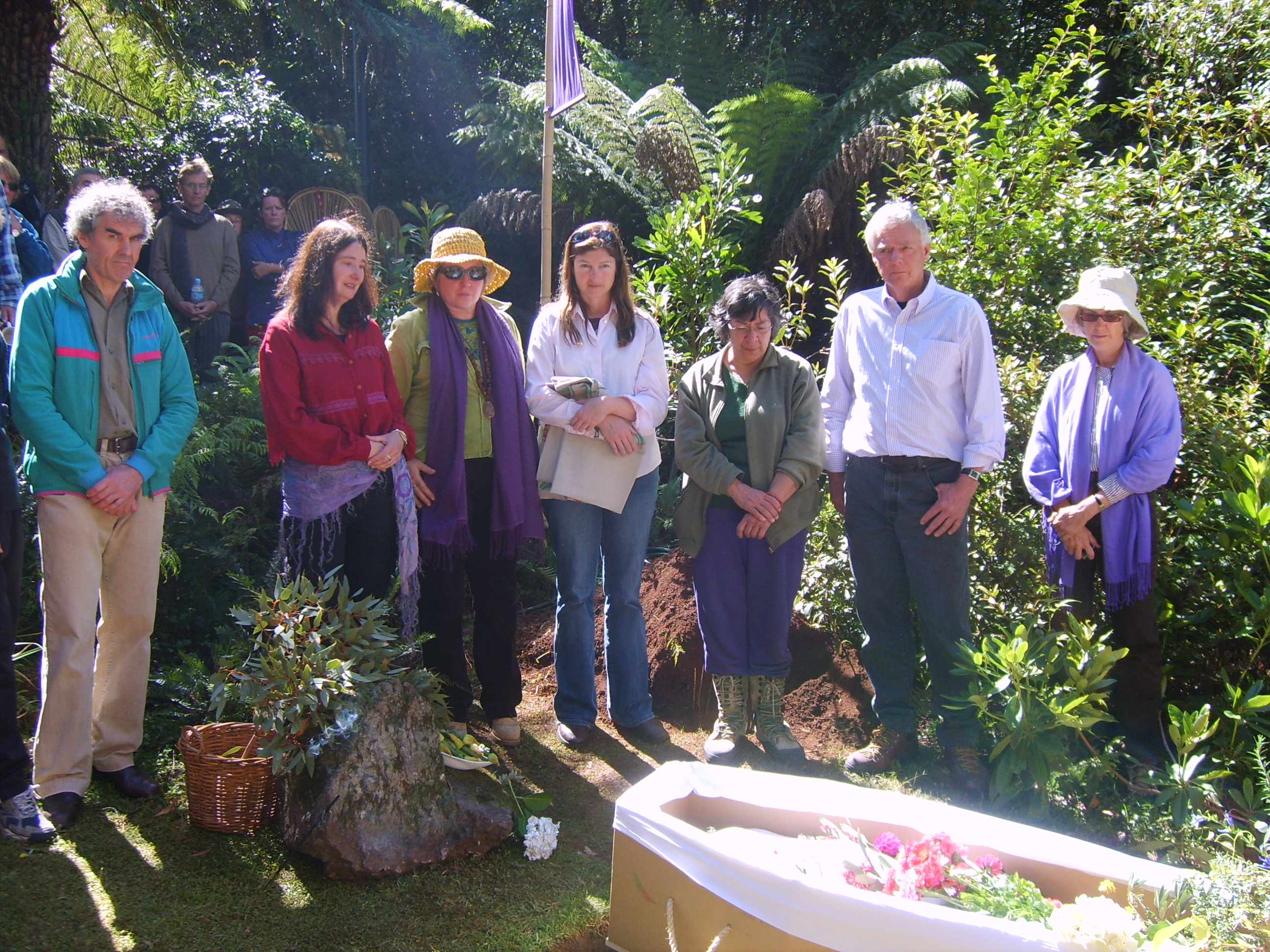
Plumwood's burial, 30 March 2008

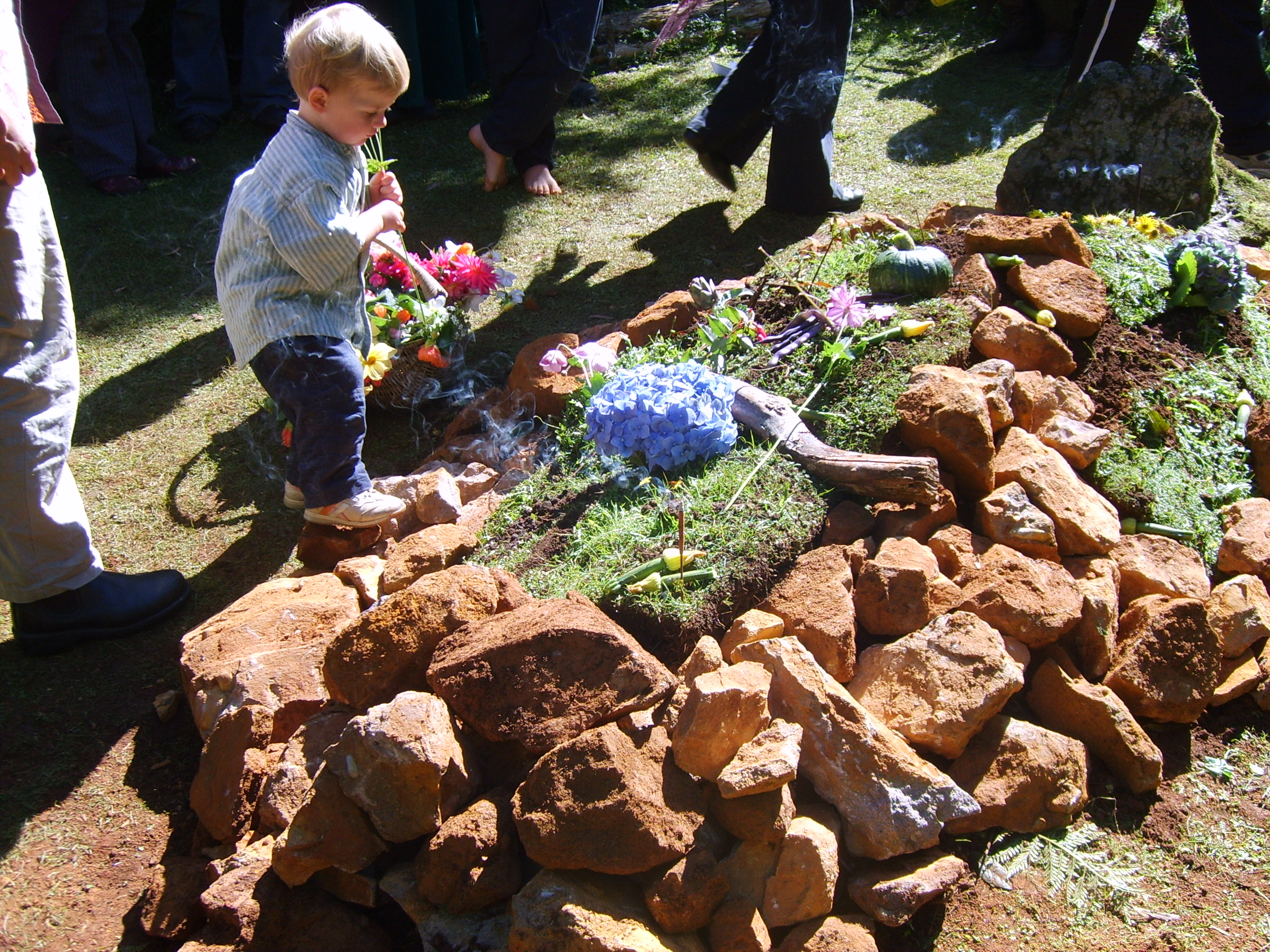
Her grave on Plumwood Mountain

== Val Plumwood Memorial Lecture Series in Australia ==
The Val Plumwood Memorial Lectures Series is biennial series of lectures that mark the contribution of Plumwood to the field of animal studies. The lecture series has consisted of the following speakers:

- Deborah Bird Rose (2009)
- Freya Matthews (2011)
- Kate Rigby (2013)
- Anat Pick (2015)
- Fiona Probyn-Rapsey (2017)
- Patrice Jones (2019)
- Richard Twine (2022)
- Dr. Erika Cudworth (2024)

The 2024 event was organized by the Australasian Animal Studies Association.

== Selected works ==
=== Books ===
- (2012) The Eye of the Crocodile, edited by Lorraine Shannon. Canberra: Australian National University E Press.
- (2002) Environmental Culture: The Ecological Crisis of Reason. Abingdon: Routledge.
- (1993) Feminism and the Mastery of Nature. London and New York: Routledge.
- (1982) with Richard Routley, Robert K. Meyer, Ross T. Brady. Relevant Logics and Their Rivals. Atascadero, CA: Ridgewood Publications.
- (1973) with Richard Routley. The Fight for the Forests: The Takeover of Australian Forests for Pines, Wood Chips and Intensive Forestry. Canberra: Australian National University.

=== Articles ===
- (2009) "Nature in the Active Voice" Archived 10 August 2015 at the Wayback Machine. Australian Humanities Review, 46, May 2009.
- (2003) "The Fight for the Forests Revisited" Archived 1 September 2007 at the Wayback Machine, paper delivered to Win, Lose or Draw: the Fight for the Forests? A Symposium, Old Canberra House, Australian National University, 14 October 2003.
- (2003) "The Politics of Reason: Toward a Feminist Logic", in Rachel Joffe Falmagne, Marjorie Hass (eds.), Representing Reason: Feminist Theory and Formal Logic. Rowman & Littlefield Publishers.
- (2003) "Feminism and the Logic of Alterity", in Falmagne and Hass, op cit.
- (1995) "Human vulnerability and the experience of being prey," Quadrant, 29(3), March 1995, pp. 29–34; also as "Being Prey", Terra Nova, 1(3), 1996.
- (1993) "The politics of reason: Towards a feminist logic". Australasian Journal of Philosophy, 71(4), pp. 436–462. doi:10.1080/00048409312345432
- (1991) "Gaia. Good for Women?", Refractory Girl, 41, pp. 11–16; also in American Philosophical Association on Women and Philosophy, April 1991.
- (1991) "Ethics and Instrumentalism: a response to Janna Thompson". Environmental Ethics, 13, pp. 139–149.
- (1991) "Nature, Self, and Gender: Feminism, Environmental Philosophy, and the Critique of Rationalism". Hypatia, 6(1), March 1991, pp. 3–27. doi:10.1111/j.1527-2001.1991.tb00206.x JSTOR 3810030
- (1989) "Do we need a sex/gender distinction?" Radical Philosophy, 51, pp. 2–11.
- (1988) "Women, humanity and nature". Radical Philosophy, 48, pp. 16–24, reprinted in S. Sayers, P. Osborne (eds.). Feminism, Socialism and Philosophy: A Radical Philosophy Reader. London: Routledge, 1990.
- (1986) "Ecofeminism: An Overview and Discussion of Positions and Arguments". Australasian Journal of Philosophy, 64, supplement 1, pp. 120–138. doi:10.1080/00048402.1986.9755430
- (1986) with Richard Routley. "The 'Fight for the Forests' affair", in Brian Martin et al. (eds.). Intellectual Suppression. Sydney: Angus & Robertson, pp. 70–73.
- (1985) with Richard Routley. "Negation and contradiction" Archived 2 November 2018 at the Wayback Machine. Revista Colombiana de Matematicas, 19, pp. 201–231.
- (1982) "World rainforest destruction – the social factors". Ecologist, 12(1), pp. 4–22.
- (1980) "Social theories, self management, and environmental problems", in D. S. Mannison, M. A. McRobbie & Richard Routley (eds.). Environmental Philosophy. Canberra: Australian National University, pp. 217–332.
- (1980) with Richard Routley. "Human Chauvinism and Environmental Ethics", in D. Mannison, M. McRobbie and R. Routley (eds.). Environmental Philosophy. Canberra: Australian National University Department of Philosophy Monograph Series RSSS, pp. 96–189.
- (1978) with Richard Routley. "Nuclear energy and obligations to the future". Inquiry: An Interdisciplinary Journal of Philosophy, 21(1–4), pp. 133–179. doi:10.1080/00201747808601840
- (1975) "Critical notice of Passmore's Man's Responsibility for Nature". Australasian Journal of Philosophy, 53(2), pp. 171–185.
- (1972) with Richard Routley. "The Semantics of First Degree Entailment". Noûs, 6(4), November, pp. 335–359. JSTOR 2214309

== See also ==
- Judith Wright
