= Nicholas Griffin (philosopher) =

Canadian-based philosopher

Nicholas John Griffin is a retired Canadian-based philosopher. He was Director of the Bertrand Russell Centre at McMaster University, Hamilton, Ontario, where he held a Canada Research Chair in Philosophy.

Griffin has a bachelor's degree from the University of Leicester, and a Ph.D. from the Australian National University. His 1974 dissertation, Relative Identity, was supervised by Richard Sylvan; he later published it as a book. His area of research is Bertrand Russell.

== Books ==
=== Monographs ===
- Relative Identity (1977)
- Russell's Idealist Apprenticeship (1991)

=== Edited works ===
- The Selected Letters of Bertrand Russell, Vol. 1, The Private Years 1884-1914 1992
- The Selected Letters of Bertrand Russell, Vol. 2: The Public Years 1914-1970 2001
- The Cambridge Companion to Bertrand Russell 2003
- Russell vs. Meinong: The Legacy of "On Denoting" (with Dale Jacquette) 2008
- The Palgrave centenary companion to Principia Mathematica (with Bernard Linsky) 2013
- Bertrand Russell: A Pacifist at War, Letters and Writings 1914-1918 2014
