= Graham Priest =

British philosopher (born 1948)

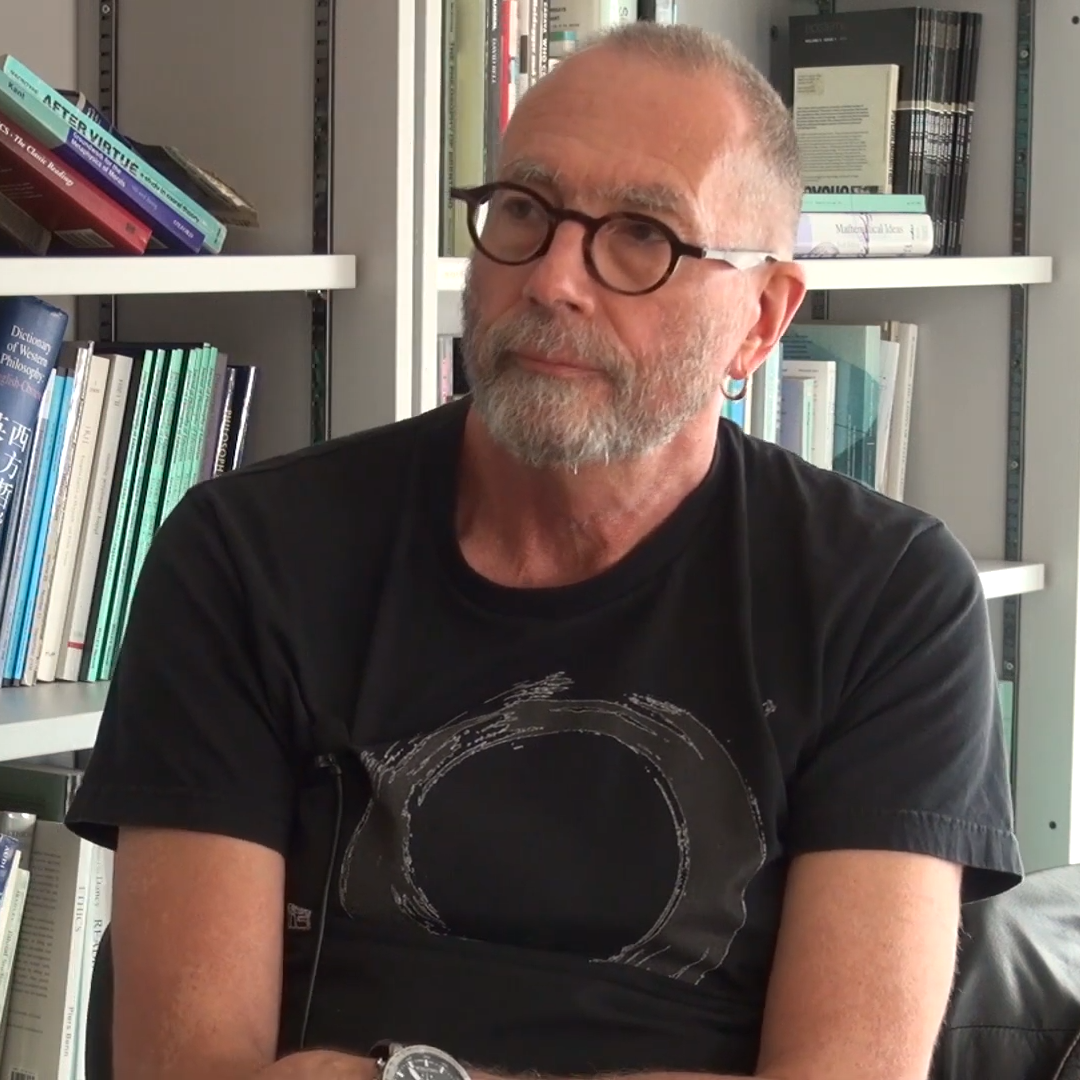
- Priest in 2017
- Born: 14 November 1948 (age 77); London, England
- Known for: An Introduction to Non-Classical Logic

Academic background
- Education: St John's College, Cambridge (BA, MA); LSE (MSc, PhD); University of Melbourne (DLitt)
- Thesis: A type theory in which variables range over predicates (1975)
- Doctoral advisor: John Lane Bell

Academic work
- Era: Contemporary philosophy
- Region: Western philosophy
- School or tradition: Analytic philosophy Dialetheism; Noneism
- Institutions: Graduate Center, CUNY; University of Melbourne; University of St Andrews; University of Queensland; University of Western Australia; Ruhr University Bochum
- Main interests: Logic, metaphysics, history of philosophy, intercultural philosophy
- Notable ideas: Dialetheism; The other worlds strategy

Graham Priest (born 1948) is a British philosopher and logician who is distinguished professor of philosophy at the CUNY Graduate Center, as well as a regular visitor at the University of Melbourne, where he was Boyce Gibson Professor of Philosophy and also at the University of St Andrews.

== Life ==
Priest was educated at St John's College, Cambridge and the London School of Economics. His thesis advisor was John Lane Bell. He also holds a DLitt from the University of Melbourne.

Priest was elected a corresponding fellow of the Australian Academy of the Humanities in 1995.

In addition to his work in philosophy and logic, Priest practised karate-do. He is 3rd dan, International Karate-do Shobukai; 4th dan, shitō-ryū, and an Australian National kumite referee and kata judge. Presently, he practices tai chi.

== Philosophical work ==
Graham Priest speaking at a colloquium on dialethianism at the University of Pittsburgh in 2026.

Priest is known for his defence of dialetheism, his in-depth analyses of the logical paradoxes (holding the thesis that there is a uniform treatment for many well-known paradoxes, such as the semantic, set-theoretic and liar paradoxes), and his many writings related to paraconsistent and other non-classical logics. In these he draws on the history of philosophy, including Asian philosophy.

Priest, a long-time resident of Australia, now residing in New York City, is the author of numerous books (most notably the textbook An Introduction to Non-Classical Logic), and has published articles in nearly every major philosophical and logical journal. He was a frequent collaborator with the late Richard Sylvan, a fellow proponent of dialetheism and paraconsistent logic.

Priest has also published on metaphilosophy (Beyond the Limits of Thought, 1995/2002).

=== Hegel ===
In his 1989 essay, Dialectic and Dialetheic, Priest has put forward an interpretation of Hegel's Science of Logic as a kind of "paraconsistent" logic, i.e. a dialetheic logic that allows for the existence of true contradictions.

== Books ==
- Priest, Graham; Routley, R. On Paraconsistency Research Report #13, Research School of Social Sciences, Australian National University 1983. Reprinted as the introductory chapters of Paraconsistent Logic, G.Priest, R. Routley and J. Norman (eds.), Philosophia Verlag, 1989. Translated into Romanian as chapters in I. Lucica (ed.), Ex Falso Quodlibet: studii de logica paraconsistenta (in Romanian), Editura Technica, 2004.
- Priest, Graham. Logic: A Very Short Introduction, Oxford University Press, 2000. ISBN 0-19-289320-3 Translated into Portuguese as Lógica para Começar, Temas & Debates, 2002. Translated into Spanish as Una Brevísima Introducción a la Lógica, Oceano, 2006. Translated into Czech, as Logika – průvodce pro každého, Dokořán, 2007. Translated into Persian by Bahram Asadian, 2007. Translated into Japanese, Iwanami Shoten, 2008.
- Priest, Graham; van Bendegem, Jean Paul; Batens, Diderik; Mortensen, Chris (2000). Frontiers of paraconsistent logic. Baldock, Hertfordshire, England Philadelphia, Pennsylvania: Research Studies Press. ISBN 9780863802539.
- Priest, Graham. Introduction to Non-Classical Logic, Cambridge University Press, 2001. 2nd edition: Introduction to Non-Classical Logic: From If to Is, Cambridge University Press, 2008. ISBN 978-0-521-67026-5 German translation of Part 1 of Introduction to Non-Classical Logic: From If to Is: Einführung in die nicht-klassische Logik, Mentis 2008.
- Priest, Graham. Beyond the Limits of Thought, Cambridge University Press, 1995. 2nd edition, Oxford University Press, 2002. ISBN 0-19-924421-9
- Priest, Graham. Towards Non-Being: the Semantics and Metaphysics of Intentionality, Oxford University Press, 2005. ISBN 0-19-926254-3
- Priest, Graham. In Contradiction: A Study of the Transconsistent, Martinus Nijhoff, 1987. Second edition Oxford University Press, 2006. ISBN 0-19-926330-2
- Priest, Graham. Doubt Truth to be a Liar, Oxford University Press, 2006. ISBN 0-19-926328-0
- Priest, Graham. Logic: A Brief Insight, Sterling 2010. ISBN 1-4027-6896-6
- Priest, Graham. One: Being an Investigation into the Unity of Reality and of its Parts, including the Singular Object which is Nothingness, Oxford University Press, 2014. ISBN 978-0-19-968825-8
- Priest, Graham. 2018. The Fifth Corner of Four: An Essay on Buddhist Metaphysics and the Catuṣkoṭi. Oxford: Oxford University Press. ISBN 978-0-19-875871-6
- Deguchi, Yasuo, Jay L. Garfield, Graham Priest, and Robert H. Sharf. 2021. What Can't Be Said: Paradox and Contradiction in East Asian Thought. New York: Oxford University Press. ISBN 978-0-19-752618-7
- Priest, Graham. 2021. Capitalism: Its Nature and Its Replacement: Buddhist and Marxist Insights. Routledge. ISBN 9781032049106
