= The Problems of Philosophy =

Book by Bertrand Russell

- Title page of the first edition
- Author: Bertrand Russell
- Language: English
- Subject: Philosophy
- Publication date: 1912
- Publication place: United Kingdom
- Media type: Print

The Problems of Philosophy is a 1912 book by the philosopher Bertrand Russell, in which the author attempts to create a brief and accessible guide to the problems of philosophy. He introduces philosophy as a repeating series of (failed) attempts to answer the same questions: Can we prove that there is an external world? Can we prove cause and effect? Can we validate any of our generalizations? Can we objectively justify morality? He asserts that philosophy cannot answer any of these questions and that any value of philosophy must lie elsewhere than in offering proofs to these questions.

Focusing on problems he believes will provoke positive and constructive discussion, Russell concentrates on knowledge rather than metaphysics: If it is uncertain that external objects exist, how can we then have knowledge of them but by probability? There is no reason to doubt the existence of external objects simply because of sense data.

The book also looks at the question of mathematical truths and philosophy within mathematics, particularly the question of how pure mathematics is possible.

Russell guides the reader through his famous 1910 distinction between knowledge by acquaintance and knowledge by description and introduces important theories of Plato, Aristotle, René Descartes, David Hume, John Locke, Immanuel Kant, Georg Wilhelm Friedrich Hegel and others to lay the foundation for philosophical inquiry by general readers and scholars alike.

In the following pages I have confined myself in the main to those problems of philosophy in regard to which I thought it possible to say something positive and constructive, since merely negative criticism seemed out of place. For this reason, theory of knowledge occupies a larger space than metaphysics in the present volume, and some topics much discussed by philosophers are treated very briefly, if at all.

— Bertrand Russell, Preface of The Problems of Philosophy

Russell called the book his 'shilling shocker' and saw it as a short, cheap book, written for a general audience; it has been his most read book for decades. It has often been set as a textbook for philosophy students. However reception of the book among philosophers has not always been positive, for instance, Geoffrey Warnock characterised the book's treatment of perception as having made an "appalling hash" of the topic.
