= An Introduction to Non-Classical Logic =

2001 textbook by Graham Priest

- Cover of the second edition
- Author: Graham Priest
- Language: English
- Subject: Non-classical logic
- Published: Cambridge University Press
- Publication date: 2001
- Media type: Book
- Followed by: An Introduction to Non-Classical Logic: From If to Is (2008, expanded 2nd edition)

An Introduction to Non-Classical Logic is a 2001 philosophy textbook by philosopher and logician Graham Priest, published by Cambridge University Press. The book provides a systematic introduction to non-classical propositional logics, which are logical systems that differ from standard classical propositional logic. It covers a wide range of topics including modal logic, intuitionistic logic, many-valued logic, relevant logic, and fuzzy logic.

== Editions ==
The book has been published in two editions by Cambridge University Press. The first edition, published in 2001, was titled simply An Introduction to Non-Classical Logic. In 2008, Priest published a substantially expanded and revised second edition under the title An Introduction to Non-Classical Logic: From If to Is. The second edition more than doubled the length of the original text, expanding from 242 to 613 pages. This expansion reflected both revisions to existing content, such as the chapter on fuzzy logic which had been critiqued in reviews of the first edition, as well as the addition of new material not covered in the first edition.

== Contents ==
The first edition of the book covers many different propositional logics, including classical logic. The subtitle From If to Is was added because the second edition also deals with predicate calculi. The second edition is organized into two main parts; Propositional Logic, and Quantification and Identity.

== Reception ==
An Introduction to Non-Classical Logic was designed for multiple audiences. According to American professor of philosophy Stewart Shapiro, the book is accessible to readers with a first or second undergraduate course in symbolic logic, though its optional metatheory sections require graduate-level knowledge. Czech professor of mathematics and philosophy Petr Hájek noted that while Priest included a brief "mathematical prolegomenon" covering set-theoretic notation and proof by induction, advanced material on metatheory would still require graduate-level coursework.

The book received positive reviews from academic philosophers. In The Review of Metaphysics: A Philosophical Quarterly, Shapiro praised it as "a very good" introduction, noting that it filled an important gap given the "extensive interest in nonclassical logics" and the typical focus on classical logic in university courses. He commended Priest's "lively and entertaining style when presenting technical material" and the book's balance between overview and technical detail, concluding that it well-served both "casual and diligent" readers.

In The Bulletin of Symbolic Logic, Hájek described it as "a very valuable source in many directions" despite some criticisms of its treatment of fuzzy logic. He noted that Priest acknowledged the book's limitations, quoting the author's preface: "If one waited for perfection one would wait forever." Following discussion with Hájek, Priest indicated plans to revise the fuzzy logic chapter in a future edition. According to J. Mackenzie, the first edition of the book "deserves to become the standard textbook in its field", which he reiterated for the second edition.

Reviewers particularly noted the book's utility as either a supplement to standard logic textbooks or as a primary text for courses on non-classical logic. However, some limitations were identified, including its restriction to propositional logic and relatively brief treatment of some philosophical issues underlying different logical systems. Shapiro encouraged Priest to write a companion volume covering quantification in non-classical logics.
