= Knowledge by acquaintance =

Knowledge derived from familiarity

Bertrand Russell makes a distinction between two different kinds of knowledge: knowledge by acquaintance and knowledge by description. Whereas knowledge by description is something like ordinary propositional knowledge (i.e., "I know that snow is white"), knowledge by acquaintance is familiarity with a person, place, or thing, typically obtained through perceptual experience (e.g., "I know Sam", "I know the city of Bogotá", or "I know Russell's Problems of Philosophy"). According to Bertrand Russell's classic account of acquaintance knowledge, acquaintance is a direct causal interaction between a person and an object of experience.

== Pre-Russellian accounts ==
=== Grote ===
In 1865, philosopher John Grote distinguished between what he described as "knowledge of acquaintance" and "knowledge-about". Grote noted that these distinctions were made in many languages. He cited Greek (γνωναι, ειδεναι), Latin (noscere, scire), German (kennen, wissen), and French (connaître, savoir) as examples.

Grote's "knowledge of acquaintance" is far better known today as "knowledge by acquaintance", following Russell's decision to change the preposition in a paper that he read to the Aristotelian Society on 6 March 1911.

=== Helmholtz ===
In a similar fashion, in 1868 Hermann von Helmholtz had distinguished clearly between das Kennen, the knowledge that consisted of "mere familiarity with phenomena", translated as "cognition" by Frances A. Welby, and das Wissen, "the knowledge of [phenomena] which can be communicated by speech". Stressing that the Kennen sort of knowledge could not "compete with" the Wissen sort of knowledge, Helmholtz argued that, despite the fact that it might be of "the highest possible degree of precision and certainty", the Kennen kind of knowledge can not be expressed in words, "even to ourselves".

=== James ===
In 1890, William James, agreeing there were two fundamental kinds of knowledge, and adopting Grote's terminology, further developed the distinctions made by Grote and Helmholtz:

I am acquainted with many people and things, which I know very little about, except their presence in the places where I have met them. I know the color blue when I see it, and the flavour of a pear when I taste it; I know an inch when I move my finger through it; a second of time, when I feel it pass; an effort of attention when I make it; a difference between two things when I notice it; but about the inner nature of these facts or what makes them what they are, I can say nothing at all. I cannot impart acquaintance with them to any one who has not already made it himself. I cannot describe them, make a blind man guess what blue is like, define to a child a syllogism, or tell a philosopher in just what respect distance is just what it is, and differs from other forms of relation. At most, I can say to my friends, Go to certain places and act in certain ways, and these objects will probably come. (1890, p.221)

== Bertrand Russell ==
=== "On Denoting" ===
The distinction in its present form was first proposed by British philosopher Bertrand Russell in his famous 1905 paper, "On Denoting". According to Russell, knowledge by acquaintance is obtained exclusively through experience, and results from a direct causal interaction between a person and an object that the person is perceiving. In accordance with Russell's views on perception, sense-data from that object are the only things that people can ever become acquainted with; they can never truly be acquainted with the physical object itself. A person can also be acquainted with his own sense of self (cogito ergo sum) and his thoughts and ideas. However, other people could not become acquainted with another person's mind, for example. They have no way of directly interacting with it, since a mind is an internal object. They can only perceive that a mind could exist by observing that person's behaviour.

To be fully justified in believing a proposition to be true one must be acquainted, not only with the fact that supposedly makes the proposition true, but with the relation of correspondence that holds between the proposition and the fact. In other words, justified true belief can only occur if I know that a proposition (e.g. "Snow is white") is true in virtue of a fact (e.g. that the frequency of the light reflected off the snow causes the human eye, and by extension, the human mind, to perceive snow to be white). By way of example, John is justified in believing that he is in pain if he is directly and immediately acquainted with his pain. John is fully justified in his belief not if he merely makes an inference regarding his pain ("I must be in pain because my arm is bleeding"), but only if he feels it as an immediate sensation ("My arm hurts!"). This direct contact with the fact and the knowledge that this fact makes a proposition true is what is meant by knowledge by acquaintance.

On the contrary, when one is not directly and immediately acquainted with a fact, such as Julius Caesar's assassination, we speak of knowledge by description. When one is not directly in contact with the fact, but knows it only indirectly by means of a description, one arguably is not entirely justified in holding a proposition true (such as e.g. "Caesar was killed by Brutus").

The acquaintance theorist can argue that one has a noninferentially justified belief "that P" only when one has the thought "that P" and one is acquainted with both the fact that P is the case, the thought "that P", and the relation of correspondence holding between the thought "that P" and the fact that P is the case. So I must not only know the proposition P, and the fact that P is the case, but also know that the fact that P is the case is what makes proposition P true.

=== The Problems of Philosophy ===
The distinction between knowledge by description and knowledge by acquaintance is developed much further in Russell's 1912 book, The Problems of Philosophy.

Russell referred to acquaintance as "the given". He theorized that certain familiarities develop from an individual's experience with various primary impressions (sensory or abstract) that are so much a part of awareness itself that the individual possesses knowledge of these familiar features without accessing memories by the cognitive process of remembering. Russell believes that acquaintance is necessary in order for us to form any proposition—that any belief we form must be composed entirely of experiential components with which we have acquaintance. Per Russell, all foundational knowledge is by acquaintance, and all non-foundational (inferential) knowledge is developed from acquaintance relations. Russell's famous description of acquaintance is as follows:

We shall say that we have acquaintance with anything of which we are directly aware, without the intermediary of any process of inference or any knowledge of truths. Thus in the presence of my table I am acquainted with the sense-data that make up the appearance of my table—its colour, shape, hardness, smoothness, etc.; all these are things of which I am immediately conscious when I am seeing and touching my table. The particular shade of colour that I am seeing may have many things said about it—I may say that it is brown, that it is rather dark, and so on. But such statements, though they make me know truths about the colour, do not make me know the colour itself any better than I did before so far as concerns knowledge of the colour itself, as opposed to knowledge of truths about it, I know the colour perfectly and completely when I see it, and no further knowledge of it itself is even theoretically possible. Thus the sense-data which make up the appearance of my table are things with which I have acquaintance, things immediately known to me just as they are.

Russell adds that we have acquaintance with sense data, desires, feelings, (probably) the self, and universals like color, brotherhood, diversity, etc. Other acquaintance theorists would later suggest that we can have acquaintance with basics such as “yellow or not yellow”; ourselves; states, properties, things, or facts (Sellars, see below); feeling, sensations, ticklings, afterimages, itches, etc. (Chalmers, see below); necessary truths (such as “the tallest thing is the only thing that is as tall as it is”, “all violinists are musicians", "3 + 2 = 5", etc.); phenomenal experiences “seemings”; and sensory inputs, or “particulars that are directly present to the mind”.

Direct acquaintance only refers to the individual's direct access to some aspect of her/his experience, whereas knowledge by acquaintance requires that the individual have a belief about it. Russell and other acquaintance theorists assert that not only does acquaintance make knowledge possible; it makes thinking itself possible. This assertion is based on the epistemic principle that empirical experience is the source of properly simple concepts.

In The Problems of Philosophy, Russell clarifies that knowledge we can have of a specific “so-and-so”, which is a thing identifiable as the thing that it uniquely is, is knowledge by description.

Per Russell, acquaintance knowledge is an awareness that occurs below the level of specific identifications of things. Knowledge by acquaintance is knowledge of a general quality of a thing, such as its shape, color, or smell. According to Russell, acquaintance does not involve reasoning that leads the individual to form an inference that the thing possessing the quality is any specific “so-and-so”. He also includes self-consciousness of one's having an experience. For example, "When I see the sun, I am often aware of my seeing the sun; thus 'my seeing the sun' is an object with which I have acquaintance." It is only possible to have acquaintance with things that exist, actual relata, according to Russell, and acquaintance does not involve thought, intention, or judgment, or application of concepts.

Russell allows for fallibility of acquaintance due to false impressions acquired in some acquaintance relations, and he argues that these do not negate the much greater number of accurate impressions that result in acquaintance based on truths. To support this position, Fumerton offers examples of error such as misidentifying a particular shade of color as another, and he suggests that acquaintance relations should not be viewed as guarantees of, but only as representations of probabilities of, truth relations.

== Subsequent views ==
=== Sellars ===
Wilfrid Sellars, in Empiricism and the Philosophy of Mind (1956), rejects acquaintance theory, arguing that acquaintance is not necessary to provide a solid foundation for knowledge and thinking, as acquaintance theorists claim. In his Empiricism and the Philosophy of Mind, he dissects the internalists' case for acquaintance. He calls the proposal that we have direct acquaintance with sensory data "The Myth of the Given". Sellars argues, "there is no reason to suppose that having the sensation of a red triangle is a cognitive or epistemic fact." He reasons that if sensations, impressions, desires, images, or feelings are to be considered as veridical experiences, then it must be likewise possible for them to be unveridical. He believes that if "immediate experience" like sensations, is susceptible to being misperceived, thus resulting in erroneous inferences for epistemic agent (as is very common in everyday life) then it doesn't make sense to think of acquaintance as a necessity for knowledge.

Sellars bypasses the usual objections to acquaintance theory, which largely focus on absence of explanation for how acquaintance is connected to the knowledge that is said to result from it. Instead, Sellars emphasizes the need to dispel the myth by closely examining the “form of the givenness”, dissecting the proposed operations of acquaintance in terms of “such facts as that physical object X looks red to person S at time t, or that there looks to person S at time t to be a red physical object over there.” (Sellars)

Sellars asserts that acquaintance theory has not been sufficiently evaluated, and that in order for the theory to be validated, the range of sense impressions it claims can be "given" to the epistemic agent must be fully accounted for by an "exhaustive list", and each type of impression must be meticulously scrutinized as a prospect for such givenness. He also argues that it is necessary to presuppose that the epistemic agent possesses empirical knowledge of particular truths in order to make assumptions about the epistemic state of cognitive states that are independent of inference. However, Sellars reasons, because presupposition is inferential, empirical knowledge, regardless of being non-inferentially acquired, is nevertheless epistemically dependent if based on the presupposition that the epistemic agent possesses other pertinent empirical knowledge. Therefore, he concludes that cognitions that are organized propositionally do not qualify as “the given”. Sellars does determine that there are beliefs that are non-inferential but that are intermixed with other beliefs that are connected in chains of inferences. (These arguments are later pursued by DeVries.)

=== Conee ===
Earl Conee invoked the idea of acquaintance knowledge in response to Frank Jackson's knowledge argument. Conee argued that when Mary the neuroscientist first sees a red object, she doesn't gain new information but rather "a maximally direct cognitive relation to the experience."[2]

Michael Tye makes similar use of the distinction between acquaintance and factual knowledge in his analysis of the Mary thought experiment.[3]

In some versions of acquaintance theory, the “given” is actually acquired by the mind's work to register, maintain, and recall a particular sensation or other object of acquaintance until it ultimately becomes established as an acquaintance relation for the epistemic agent., but theorists emphasis that this is not to be confused with the same processes by which memories are developed.

=== Fumerton ===
Richard Fumerton views direct acquaintance (the theory of which he often refers to as “classical foundationalism”) as simple, hence indefinable. He asserts that it is the central concept around which philosophy of mind and epistemology must be developed. He acknowledges that although he takes direct acquaintance to be basic, it is viewed by other philosophers as a mystery. Fumerton (1995) suggests that the following are the necessary conditions to constitute knowledge by acquaintance.

i. S is directly acquainted with the fact that p;
ii. S is directly acquainted with the thought that p; and
iii. S is directly acquainted with the correspondence that holds between the fact that P and the thought that P (Fumerton 1995, pp. 73–79).

According to Fumerton, acquaintance awareness is not non-relational or intentional thinking. There is a sui generis relation between the individual epistemic agent and “a thing, property, or fact”. He concurs with Russell that the acquaintance relation between the individual's awareness and a state, object, fact, or property obtains in a way that cannot be reduced to more basic operations. He suggests that one potential benefit of acquaintance, or “the given”, is that it solves the problem of infinite regress of justification for beliefs by serving as the basis on which all inferences can be grounded. Skeptics reject this proposal, arguing that in “the given” would need to be propositional in order to ground inferences, or, at minimum have its own truth value.

Fumerton asserts that because acquaintance requires that its relata actually exist, having acquaintance with something both justifies belief in the thing and makes the belief true. Fumerton offers this response to skeptics of acquaintance.

If I am asked what reason I have for thinking that there is such a relation as acquaintance, I will, of course, give the unhelpful answer that I am acquainted with such a relation. The answer is question-begging if it is designed to convince someone that there is such a relation, but if the view is true it would be unreasonable to expect its proponent to give any other answer. (Fumerton)

Skeptics who find Fumerton's response unsatisfactory persist that having a truth value requires employment of concepts, i.e., comparing, classifying, and making judgments. That process involves at least the simplest of beliefs associated with memories of previous experienced, making acquaintance a form of inference.

But, Fumerton further asserts that an individual can have direct acquaintance not just possible with the non-propositional experiences but also with the “relation of correspondence that holds between the non-propositional experience and the propositional thought." He finds that these three acquaintance relationships are required in order for a proposition to be true (correspondence theory of truth).

a. the truth-maker (S is directly acquainted with the fact that p);
b. the truth-bearer (S is directly acquainted with the thought that p); and
c. the correspondence relation (S is directly acquainted with the correspondence between the fact that P and the thought that p). (Fumerton)

Fumerton proposes that while acquaintance does not depend on proposition, one can have thoughts and propositions established in acquaintance, and that justification for belief is effected by the individual's acquaintance with the correspondence relation between a thought and the fact associated with it. BonJour also mentions this relation, but he views this recognition as requiring proposition or judgment.

=== BonJour ===
Laurence BonJour (2003) asserts that acquaintance is a "built-in" awareness, that does not involve cognitive processes, and that it justifies belief. He argues that an adequate defense of acquaintance must explain the process by which acquaintance builds and maintains its cache of impressions into which new inputs of matching impressions can be added and caused to engage with cognitive processes. He also posits that for an epistemic agent to establish acquaintance unavoidably engages a proposition, or at least requires categorizing of inputs.

In response to Sellars, BonJour asserts that an individual can have experiences that are not connected to inferences but that there is a suitable relation of those experiences and her/his beliefs. BonJour asserts that awareness is “built-in” and that it provides full justification for essential empirical beliefs.

Fallibility: BonJour asserts that the cognitive content that constitutes the basis for typically accurate interpretation of sensory inputs makes it possible to acquire many true acquaintances, and the efficacy of this arrangement is not undermined by occurrences of inaccurate interpretations.

=== Chisholm ===
In his “Object and Person” (2002), Roderick Chisholm examines the conflicting perspectives between philosophers on whether or not we can actually be directly aware of the contents of our experiences. The unique property of an object of acquaintance permits the epistemic agent to develop acquaintance with that particular property by which the agent can identify it. In his Acquaintance and the Mind-Body Problem, Chisolm asserts that all epistemic agents have direct acquaintance with the self. He notes that both René Descartes and Gottlob Frege held this view as well.

=== Chalmers ===
David Chalmers (2002) argues that for acquaintance to depend on propositions as Bonjour suggests, then instances of acquaintance require their own justification. He further contends that acquaintance with an object of acquaintance cannot serve as justification for any beliefs without the acquaintance itself being justified. Chalmers contends that as acquaintances is understood as separate from cognition, it does not seem feasible as justification for beliefs or as a basis for knowledge.

=== The speckled hen case ===
The famous speckled hen case has been invoked by acquaintance skeptics who insist that the theory cannot explain acquaintance with very simple mental states, like viewing a few dots against a solid background color can be said to justify belief in knowledge by acquaintance, while it is believed that viewing a significantly larger number of dots cannot justify belief in it. They believe that defenders of acquaintance theory should answer as to why the capacity of direct acquaintance should be so limited. Sellars resolved the problem simply by asserting that naturally the speckled hen experiment fails to support an acquaintance relation because the individual cannot reasonably be expected to build up such an association where the total number of objects in an array cannot be known without methodically accounting for them all. He points out that the “character of the experience” is not distinguishable to the individual's subconscious in such cases of instant presentations of complex arrays of data.

=== Knowledge of other people ===
Some recent work in epistemology deploys ideas concerning knowledge by acquaintance in developing an epistemology of knowing other people. For some examples, see Bonnie Talbert's "Knowing Other People" and Matthew Benton's "Epistemology Personalized" and "The Epistemology of Interpersonal Relations".

== See also ==
- Grok – Neologism coined by Robert Heinlein
- Conversazione – Learned or art society's social gathering for conversation and discussion
- Knowledge argument – Thought experiment in the philosophy of mind
- On Denoting – 1905 philosophy essay by Bertrand Russell
- Tacit knowledge – Skills, ideas and experiences
- The Problems of Philosophy (1912) – Book by Bertrand Russell

== Bibliography ==
- BonJour, Laurence, Sosa, Ernest, Epistemic Justification: Internalism vs. Externalism, Foundations vs. Virtues, Malden, MA: Blackwell, 2003.
- Chalmers, David, Acquaintance, Phenomenal Concepts and the Knowledge Argument, University of Arizona, (2002).
- Chisholm, Roderick, Person and Object – A Metaphysical Study, Rutledge, Devonshire Press, Torquay (2002).
- Chisholm, Roderick, Acquaintance and the Mind-Body Problem, Oxford University Press, (2008).
- DePaul, Michael & Zagzebski, Linda (eds.), Intellectual Virtue: Perspectives from Ethics and Epistemology, Oxford: Clarendon Press (2003).
- DeVries, Willem (21 September 2011). "Wilfrid Sellars". In Zalta, Edward N. (ed.). Stanford Encyclopedia of Philosophy (Fall 2011 ed.). ISSN 1095-5054. OCLC 429049174.
- Fumerton, Richard, Metaepistemology and Skepticism, Rowman & Littlefield Publishers, Inc. (1995) .
- Hasan, Ali; Fumerton, Richard (21 March 2014). "Knowledge by Acquaintance vs. Description". In Zalta, Edward N. (ed.). Stanford Encyclopedia of Philosophy (Spring 2014 ed.). ISSN 1095-5054. OCLC 429049174.
- Hayner, P., "Knowledge by Acquaintance", Philosophy and Phenomenological Research, Vol.29, No.3, (March, 1969), pp. 423–431.
- Helmholtz, H.L.F. von (Pye-Smith, P.H. trans.), [1868/1881/1962] "The Recent Progress of the Theory of Vision", pp. 93–185 in Helmholtz, H., Popular Scientific Lectures, Dover Publications, (New York), 1962.
  - Paper first published in German in 1868.
  - This (1962) volume is a selection of the translations that were first published in English in 1881.
- James, William, The Principles of Psychology: Volume One, Henry Holt and Company, (New York), 1890.
- Lazerowitz, M., "Knowledge by Description", The Philosophical Review, Vol.46, No.4, (July 1937), pp. 402–415.
- Martens, D.B., "Knowledge by acquaintance/by description", pp. 237–240 in Dancy, J. & Sosa, E. (eds.), A Companion to Epistemology, Blackwell Publishers, (Oxford), 1993.
- Parker, Dewitt H. (1945a), "Knowledge by Acquaintance", The Philosophical Review, Vol.54, No.1, (January 1945), pp. 1–18.
- Parker, Dewitt H. (1945b), "Knowledge by Description", The Philosophical Review, Vol.54, No.5, (September 1945), pp. 458–488.
- Russell, Bertrand, "Knowledge by Acquaintance and Knowledge by Description", Proceedings of the Aristotelian Society (New Series), Vol.XI, (1910–1911), pp. 108–128: Read to the Society on 6 March 1911.
- Russell, Bertrand, The Problems of Philosophy (1912). Project Gutenberg, Chp. 5, p. 18–19.
- Sainsbury, R.M. (1995a), "Acquaintance and Description", p.4 in Honderich, T. (ed.), The Oxford Companion to Philosophy, Oxford University Press, (Oxford), 1995.
- Sainsbury, R.M. (1995b), "Descriptions", p.192 in Honderich, T. (ed.), The Oxford Companion to Philosophy, Oxford University Press, (Oxford), 1995.
- Sellars, Wilfrid, Empiricism and the Philosophy of Mind, (1956). Edited in hypertext by Andrew Chrucky (1995). Archived 18 April 2016 at the Wayback Machine
