= Theory of descriptions =

Philosophical theory by Bertrand Russell

The theory of descriptions is the philosopher Bertrand Russell's most significant contribution to the philosophy of language. It is also known as Russell's theory of descriptions (commonly abbreviated as RTD). In short, Russell argued that the syntactic form of descriptions (phrases that took the form of "The flytrap" and "A flytrap") is misleading, as it does not correlate their logical and/or semantic architecture. While descriptions may seem like fairly uncontroversial phrases, Russell argued that providing a satisfactory analysis of the linguistic and logical properties of a description is vital to clarity in important philosophical debates, particularly in semantic arguments, epistemology and metaphysical elements.

Since the first development of the theory in Russell's 1905 paper "On Denoting", RTD has been hugely influential and well-received within the philosophy of language. However, it has not been without its critics. In particular, the philosophers P. F. Strawson and Keith Donnellan have given notable, well known criticisms of the theory. Most recently, RTD has been defended by various philosophers and even developed in promising ways to bring it into harmony with generative grammar in Noam Chomsky's sense, particularly by Stephen Neale. Such developments have themselves been criticised, and debate continues.

Russell viewed his theory of descriptions as a kind of analysis that is now called propositional analysis (not to be confused with propositional calculus).

== Overview ==
Bertrand Russell's theory of descriptions was initially put forth in his 1905 essay "On Denoting", published in the journal of philosophy Mind. Russell's theory is focused on the logical form of expressions involving denoting phrases, which he divides into three groups:

1. Denoting phrases which do not denote anything, for example "the current Emperor of Kentucky".
2. Phrases which denote one definite object, for example "the present President of the U.S.A." We need not know which object the phrase refers to for it to be unambiguous, for example "the cutest kitten" is a unique individual but his or her actual identity is unknown.
3. Phrases which denote ambiguously, for example, "a flytrap".

Indefinite descriptions constitute Russell's third group. Descriptions most frequently appear in the standard subject–predicate form.

Russell put forward his theory of descriptions to solve a number of problems in the philosophy of language. The two major problems are (1) co-referring expressions and (2) non-referring expressions.

The problem of co-referring expressions originated primarily with Gottlob Frege as the problem of informative identities. For example, if the morning star and the evening star are the same planet in the sky seen at different times of day (indeed, they are both the planet Venus: the morning star is the planet Venus seen in the morning sky and the evening star is the planet Venus seen in the evening sky), how is it that someone can think that the morning star rises in the morning but the evening star does not? This is apparently problematic because although the two expressions seem to denote the same thing, one cannot substitute one for the other, which one ought to be able to do with identical or synonymous expressions.

The problem of non-referring expressions is that certain expressions that are meaningful do not truly refer to anything. For example, by "any dog is annoying" it is not meant that there is a particular individual dog, namely any dog, that has the property of being annoying (similar considerations go for "some dog", "every dog", "a dog", and so on). Likewise, by "the current Emperor of Kentucky is gray" it is not meant that there is some individual, namely the current Emperor of Kentucky , who has the property of being gray; Kentucky was never a monarchy, so there is currently no Emperor. Thus, what Russell wants to avoid is admitting mysterious non-existent objects into his ontology. Furthermore, the law of the excluded middle requires that one of the following propositions, for example, must be true: either "the current Emperor of Kentucky is gray" or "it is not the case that the current Emperor of Kentucky is gray". Normally, propositions of the subject-predicate form are said to be true if and only if the subject is in the extension of the predicate. But, there is currently no Emperor of Kentucky. So, since the subject does not exist, it is not in the extension of either predicate (it is not on the list of gray people or non-gray people). Thus, it appears that this is a case in which the law of excluded middle is violated, which is also an indication that something has gone wrong.

== Definite descriptions ==
Russell analyzes definite descriptions similarly to indefinite descriptions, except that the individual is now uniquely specified. Take as an example of a definite description the sentence "the current Emperor of Kentucky is gray". Russell analyses this phrase into the following component parts (with 'x' and 'y' representing variables):

1. there is an x such that x is an emperor of Kentucky.
2. for every x and every y, if both x and y are emperors of Kentucky, then y is x (i.e. there is at most one emperor of Kentucky).
3. anything that is an emperor of Kentucky is gray.

Thus, a definite description (of the general form 'the F is G') becomes the following existentially quantified phrase in classic symbolic logic (where 'x' and 'y' are variables and 'F' and 'G' are predicates – in the example above, F would be "is an emperor of Kentucky", and G would be "is gray"):

$$\exists x ((Fx \land \forall y(Fy \rightarrow x=y)) \land Gx)$$

Informally, this reads as follows: something exists with the property F, there is only one such thing, and this unique thing also has the property G.

This analysis, according to Russell, solves the two problems noted above as related to definite descriptions:

1. "The morning star rises in the morning" no longer needs to be thought of as having the subject-predicate form. It is instead analysed as "there is one unique thing such that it is the morning star and it rises in the morning". Thus, strictly speaking, the two expressions "the morning star..." and "the evening star..." are not synonymous, so it makes sense that they cannot be substituted (the analysed description of the evening star is "there is one unique thing such that it is the evening star and it rises in the evening"). This solves Gottlob Frege's problem of informative identities.
2. Since the phrase "the current Emperor of Kentucky is gray" is not a referring expression, according to Russell's theory it need not refer to a mysterious non-existent entity. Russell says that if there are no entities X with property F, the proposition "X has property G" is false for all values of X.

Russell says that all propositions in which the Emperor of Kentucky has a primary occurrence are false. The denials of such propositions are true, but in these cases the Emperor of Kentucky has a secondary occurrence (the truth value of the proposition is not a function of the truth of the existence of the Emperor of Kentucky).

== Indefinite descriptions ==
Take as an example of an indefinite description the sentence "some dog is annoying". Russell analyses this phrase into the following component parts (with 'x' and 'y' representing variables):

- There is an x such that:
1. x is a dog; and
2. x is being annoying.

Thus, an indefinite description (of the general form 'a D is A') becomes the following existentially quantified phrase in classic symbolic logic (where 'x' and 'y' are variables and 'D' and 'A' are predicates):

$$\exists x (Dx \land Ax)$$

Informally, this reads as follows: there is something such that it is D and A.

This analysis, according to Russell, solves the second problem noted above as related to indefinite descriptions. Since the phrase "some dog is annoying" is not a referring expression, according to Russell's theory, it need not refer to a mysterious non-existent entity. Furthermore, the law of excluded middle need not be violated (i.e. it remains a law), because "some dog is annoying" comes out true: there is a thing that is both a dog and annoying. Thus, Russell's theory seems to be a better analysis insofar as it solves several problems.

== Criticism of Russell's analysis ==
=== P. F. Strawson ===
P. F. Strawson argued that Russell had failed to correctly represent what one means when one says a sentence in the form of "the current Emperor of Kentucky is gray." According to Strawson, this sentence is not contradicted by "No one is the current Emperor of Kentucky", for the former sentence contains not an existential assertion, but attempts to use "the current Emperor of Kentucky" as a referring (or denoting) phrase. Since there is no current Emperor of Kentucky, the phrase fails to refer to anything, and so the sentence is neither true nor false.

Another kind of counter-example that Strawson and philosophers since have raised concerns that of "incomplete" definite descriptions, that is sentences which have the form of a definite description but which do not uniquely denote an object. Strawson gives the example "the table is covered with books". Under Russell's theory, for such a sentence to be true there would have to be only one table in all of existence. But by uttering a phrase such as "the table is covered with books", the speaker is referring to a particular table: for instance, one that is in the vicinity of the speaker. Two broad responses have been constructed to this failure: a semantic and a pragmatic approach. The semantic approach of philosophers like Stephen Neale suggests that the sentence does in fact have the appropriate meaning as to make it true. Such meaning is added to the sentence by the particular context of the speaker—that, say, the context of standing next to a table "completes" the sentence. Ernie Lepore suggests that this approach treats "definite descriptions as harboring hidden indexical expressions, so that whatever descriptive meaning alone leaves unfinished its context of use can complete".

Pragmatist responses deny this intuition and say instead that the sentence itself, following Russell's analysis, is not true but that the act of uttering the false sentence communicated true information to the listener.

=== Keith Donnellan ===
According to Keith Donnellan, there are two distinct ways we may use a definite description such as "the current Emperor of Kentucky is gray", and thus makes his distinction between the referential and the attributive use of a definite description. He argues that both Russell and Strawson make the mistake of attempting to analyse sentences removed from their context. We can mean different and distinct things while using the same sentence in different situations.

For example, suppose Smith has been brutally murdered. When the person who discovers Smith's body says, "Smith's murderer is insane", we may understand this as the attributive use of the definite description "Smith's murderer", and analyse the sentence according to Russell. This is because the discoverer might equivalently have worded the assertion, "Whoever killed Smith is insane." Now consider another speaker: suppose Jones, though innocent, has been arrested for the murder of Smith, and is now on trial. When a reporter sees Jones talking to himself outside the courtroom, and describes what she sees by saying, "Smith's murderer is insane", we may understand this as the referring use of the definite description, for we may equivalently reword the reporter's assertion thus: "That person who I see talking to himself, and who I believe murdered Smith, is insane." In this case, we should not accept Russell's analysis as correctly representing the reporter's assertion. On Russell's analysis, the sentence is to be understood as an existential quantification of the conjunction of three components:

- There is an x such that:
1. x murdered Smith;
2. there is no y, y not equal x, such that y murdered Smith; and
3. x is insane.

If this analysis of the reporter's assertion were correct, then since Jones is innocent, we should take her to mean what the discoverer of Smith's body meant, that whoever murdered Smith is insane. We should then take her observation of Jones talking to himself to be irrelevant to the truth of her assertion. This clearly misses her point.

Thus the same sentence, "Smith's murderer is insane", can be used to mean quite different things in different contexts. There are, accordingly, contexts in which "the current Emperor of Kentucky is not gray" is false because no one is the current Emperor of Kentucky, and contexts in which it is a sentence referring to a person whom the speaker takes to be the current Emperor of Kentucky, true or false according to the hair of the pretender.

=== Saul Kripke ===
In Reference and Existence, Saul Kripke argues that while Donnellan is correct to point out two uses of the phrase, it does not follow that the phrase is ambiguous between two meanings. For example, when the reporter finds out that Jones, the person she has been calling Smith's murderer did not murder Smith, she will admit that her use of the name was incorrect. Kripke defends Russell's analysis of definite descriptions, and argues that Donnellan does not adequately distinguish meaning from use, or, speaker's meaning from sentence meaning.

=== Other objections ===
The theory of descriptions is regarded as a redundant and cumbersome method. The theory claims that ‘The present King of France is bald’ means ‘One and only one entity is the present King of France, and that one is bald’. L. Susan Stebbing suggests that if ‘that’ is used referentially, ‘that one is bald’ is logically equivalent to the entire conjunction. Hence, the conjunction of three propositions is unnecessary as one proposition is already adequate.

P. T. Geach maintains that Russell's theory commits the fallacy of too many questions. Such a sentence as "The present President of Sealand is bald" involves two questions: (1) Is anybody at the moment a President of Sealand ? (2) Are there at the moment different people each of whom is a President of Sealand? Unless the answer to 1 is affirmative and the answer to 2 negative, the affirmative answer " yes, the President of Sealand is bald " is not false but indeterminate. In addition, Russell's theory involves unnecessary logical complications.

Furthermore, Honcques Laus contends that Russell's analysis involves an error in the truth value that all sentences can be either true or false. Russell's nonacceptance of multiple-valued logic makes himself unable to assign a proper truth value to unverifiable and unfalsifiable sentences and causes the puzzle of the laws of thought. The third truth value, namely ‘indeterminate’ or ‘undefined’ should be accepted in the event that both truth and falsity are absent or inapplicable.

William G. Lycan argues that Russell's theory intrinsically applies solely to one extraordinary subclass of singular terms but an adequate solution to the puzzles must be generalized. His theory merely addresses the principal use of the definite article "the", but fails to deal with plural uses or the generic use. Russell also fails to consider anaphoric uses of singular referential expressions.

Arthur Pap argues that the theory of descriptions must be rejected because according to the theory of descriptions, 'the present king of France is bald' and 'the present king of France is not bald' are both false and not contradictories otherwise the law of excluded middle would be violated.

== See also ==
- Russellian view
- Sense and reference

== References and further reading ==
- Bertolet, Rod. (1999). "Theory of Descriptions", The Cambridge Dictionary of Philosophy, second edition. New York: Cambridge University Press.
- Donnellan, Keith. (1966). "Reference and Definite Descriptions", Philosophical Review, 75, pp. 281–304.
- Kripke, Saul. (1977). "Speaker's Reference and Semantic Reference", Midwest Studies in Philosophy, 2, pp. 255–276.
- Ludlow, Peter. (2005). "Descriptions", The Stanford Encyclopedia of Philosophy, E. Zalta (ed.). Online text
- Neale, Stephen (1990). Descriptions Bradford, MIT Press.
- Neale, Stephen (2005). "A Century Later", Mind 114, pp. 809–871.
- Ostertag, Gary (ed.). (1998) Definite Descriptions: A Reader Bradford, MIT Press. (Includes Donnellan (1966), Kripke (1977), Chapter 3 of Neale (1990), Russell (1905), Chapter 16 of Russell (1919). and Strawson (1950).)
- Russell, Bertrand. (1905). "On Denoting", Mind 14, pp. 479–493. Online at Wikisource.
- Russell, Bertrand. (1919). Introduction to Mathematical Philosophy, London: George Allen and Unwin.
- Strawson, P. F. (1950). "On Referring", Mind 59, pp. 320–344.
