= Wooden iron =

Polemical term in philosophical rhetoric

Wooden iron (German: hölzernes Eisen) is a polemical term often used in philosophical rhetoric to describe the impossibility of an opposing argument. The term is a German proverbial oxymoron, which synthesizes the concept of the "wooden", which is organic, with the concept of "iron" which is inorganic. Such a contradictio in adjecto is a logical inconsistency. It occurs when a modifying adjective opposes its noun, as in "square circle," "freezing fire," "boiling snow," or "hard liquid."

== Overview ==
Arthur Schopenhauer used the term in The World as Will and Representation (1819) in his critiques of Immanuel Kant. For his argument against absolutes he wrote "... the categorical imperative leaps into the world, in order to command there with its unconditioned ought—a scepter of wooden iron." (See Payne's trans., WWR 1:523.) His chapter titled "On the Fundamental View of Idealism" further describes his position on subjectivity by using the term to demonstrate the difference between "the representation of the intellect" and the "subject" itself. In this imaginary dialogue between intellect and matter he wrote, as intellect speaking to matter: "Whoever thinks me away, and then believes he can still think of you, is involved in a gross delusion; for your existence outside my representation is a direct contradiction, a wooden-iron." (See Payne's trans., WWR 2:17.)

Friedrich Nietzsche, who was an avid Schopenhauer scholar, continued to employ the term throughout his writings in the latter half of the 19th century. Nietzsche's experience with philology also brought new meaning to the term. He attacked Moritz Carrière's so-called "real idealism" (see Notebooks Fall 1873—Winter 1873-74 30[16]). He used it to describe Richard Wagner's "infinite melody" (see Notebooks Fall 1881 11[198]). He also considered "unegoistic actions" and "unegoistic drives" to be examples of wooden iron (see Notebooks Summer-Fall 1884 26[224]). He similarly dismissed philosophical concepts of "pure knowledge" and "thing in itself" (see Notebooks Summer-Fall 1884 26[413]). The term was also employed in his poetic attempts to criticize socialism and the building of a "free society" (see Book 5 of The Gay Science, §356).

== See also ==
- Round square copula
