= Rodney Bertolet =

American philosopher

- Born: March 22, 1949 (age 77); Allentown, Pennsylvania, US

Education
- Education: Franklin & Marshall College (BA); University of Wisconsin–Madison (PhD)

Philosophical work
- Era: Contemporary philosophy
- Region: Western philosophy
- School: Analytic
- Institutions: Purdue University
- Main interests: Philosophy of language

Rodney Bertolet is an American philosopher and Professor Emeritus of Philosophy at Purdue University. Bertolt is known for his works on speech acts. He is a former president of Indiana Philosophical Association (1983–1984).

== Books ==
- What is Said: A Theory of Indirect Speech Reports, in the Philosophical Studies Series, ed. K. Lehrer, Kluwer Academic Publishing, 1990
