= On Denoting =

1905 philosophy essay by Bertrand Russell

"On Denoting" is an essay by Bertrand Russell. It was published in the philosophy journal Mind in October 1905. In the essay, Russell introduces and advocates his theory of denoting phrases, according to which definite descriptions and other "denoting phrases ... never have any meaning in themselves, but every proposition in whose verbal expression they occur has a meaning." This theory later became the basis for Russell's descriptivism with regard to proper names, and his view that proper names are "disguised" or "abbreviated" definite descriptions.

In the 1920s, Frank P. Ramsey referred to the essay as "that paradigm of philosophy". In the Stanford Encyclopedia of Philosophy entry Descriptions, Peter Ludlow singled the essay out as "the paradigm of philosophy", and called it a work of "tremendous insight"; provoking discussion and debate among philosophers of language and linguists for over a century.

== The "denoting phrase" ==
=== Russell's concept of a denoting phrase ===
For Russell, a denoting phrase is a semantically complex expression that can serve as the grammatical subject of a sentence. Paradigmatic examples include both definite descriptions ("the shortest spy") and indefinite descriptions ("some sophomore"). A phrase does not need to have a denotation to be a denoting phrase: "the greatest prime number" is a denoting phrase in Russell's sense even though there is no such thing as the greatest prime number. According to Russell's theory, denoting phrases do not contribute objects as the constituents of the singular propositions in which they occur. Denotation, in other words, is a semantically inert property, in this view. Whereas Frege held that there were two distinct parts (or aspects) of the meaning of every term, phrase, or sentence (its sense and reference: Sinn and Bedeutung), Russell explicitly rejects the notion of sense (Sinn), and gives several arguments against it.

=== Reference to something that does not exist ===
However, at the very beginning of the article, Russell distinguishes between cases where "a phrase may be denoting and yet not denote anything (e.g. 'the present King of France')" (there was no king of France in Russell's lifetime), cases where they may denote "one definite object (such as 'the present King of England')" (Edward VII was the king of England at the time of Russell's article), and cases where they may "denote ambiguously (such as 'a man')". The cases of denoting without anything to denote and ambiguous denotation are formally denoting phrases and purport to denote a singular entity, yet fail to do so. Therefore, only the second case can be the subject of true sentences.

=== Epistemology ===
In any case, after clarifying the sense of the term "denoting phrase" and providing several examples to illustrate the idea, Russell explains the epistemological motivations for his theory. Russell believes at this point that there are essentially two modes of knowing: knowledge by description and knowledge by (direct) acquaintance. Knowledge by acquaintance is limited to the sense data of the phenomenal world and to one's own private inner experiences, while knowledge of everything else (other minds, physical objects, and so on) can be known only by way of general descriptions.

== The theory of descriptions ==
=== Mathematical description ===
Russell starts out by defining the "fundamental" notion of a propositional function. This is basically a modified version of Frege's idea of unsaturated concepts. Hence, "C(x) stands for a proposition in which C is a constituent and where x, the variable, is essentially and wholly undetermined." Then everything, nothing and something ("the most primitive of denoting phrases") are to be interpreted as follows:

$$C(E) \leftrightarrow \forall x C(x)$$
$$C(N) \leftrightarrow \forall x \lnot C(x)$$
$$C(S) \leftrightarrow \lnot \forall x \lnot C(x)$$

where E stands for everything, N stands for nothing and S stands for something. All is taken as primitive and indefinable and the others are defined in terms of it. Russell emphasises that denoting phrases can have no meaning apart from that which is assigned to them within the propositions in which they occur, all of which are meaningful. This is the foundation of Russell's theory of descriptions as he proceeds to illustrate.

=== Illustration ===
The phrase "the father of Charles II (F) was executed (E)" is interpreted as the following quantificational assertion:

$$\exists x \left( \left( F \left( x \right) \land  \forall y \left( F \left( y \right) \rightarrow x=y \right) \right) \land E \left( x \right) \right)$$

In other words, there is one and only one thing x such that x is the father of Charles II and x was executed.

So, if C represents any statement at all about the father of Charles II, the statement 'C (the father of Charles II)' always implies:

$$\exists x \left( F \left( x \right) \land \forall y \left( F \left( y \right) \rightarrow  x=y \right) \right)$$

It follows that if there is not one and only one entity that satisfies the above, then every proposition that contains the descriptions in a primary occurrence is false. (If the mother of Charles II was ‘unfaithful’ the statement may be false, because the alleged father may have been executed but the real father hadn't - therefore not satisfying the formula since F(x) and E(x) would not be the same.) In this way, Russell points out, it will turn out that all statements containing non-referring descriptions (e.g. "The present king of France is a great writer") are false. Russell's theory reduces all propositions that contain definite descriptions into forms that do not.

== Meinong ==
He then criticises Alexius Meinong's theory of objects which, according to Russell, is ontologically promiscuous and self-contradictory. Both of these criticisms stem from Meinong's theory that there is an object, whether it exists or subsists, for every set of properties. Therefore, there is an object that is both round and not round, or round and square. Russell argues that Meinong's theory entails conclusions such as "the present King of France" both exists and does not exist. However, Meinong does not attribute existence (or any other sort of being) to non-existent objects. Russell also accuses Meinong of violating the law of non-contradiction by asserting that the "round square" is both round and not round. Meinong, on the other hand, maintains that the laws of logic do not apply to such phenomena as "impossible" objects that have no being.

== Resolving the problem of negative existentials ==
One of the fundamental puzzles that Russell hopes to resolve with the theory of descriptions is the problem of non-referring expressions or, as they are now called, negative existentials. He finally explains how his theory resolves this problem after invoking a distinction between what he calls primary and secondary occurrences of denoting phrases.

=== Statements about concepts where the object does not exist ===
Since definite descriptions are just quantificational devices on Russell's view, they can enter into scope relations with other logical operators. In the case of negative existentials, there is an ambiguity between two different (primary and secondary) readings of the quantificational assertion. For example, Russell uses the case of "the present King of France is not bald." Here the two possible readings are:

$$\exists x (K(x) \land \forall y (K(y) \rightarrow y=x) \land \lnot B(x))$$

$$\lnot \exists x (K(x) \land \forall y (K(y) \rightarrow y=x) \land B(x))$$

In the first case, the statement is false because it quantifies over non-existent entities. In the second case, the statement is true because it is not the case that there is a present King of France. "Thus all propositions in which 'the King of France' has a primary occurrence are false: the denials of such propositions are true, but in them 'the King of France' has a secondary occurrence." Contemporarily, it is customary to discuss Russell's primary/secondary distinction in the more logically exact terms of wide and narrow scope. The scope distinction regards the operator that, on one reading, modifies only the subject, and on the other, modifies the entire sentence.

=== Ambiguity ===
Russell resolves the problem of ambiguity in propositional attitude reports in a similar manner. He refers to an example similar to Frege's puzzle about identity: "George IV wondered whether Scott is the author of Waverley." In this case, it is obvious that King George is not wondering whether Scott is identical to Scott. Russell rejects Frege's solution of distinguishing between sense and reference. Quantificational descriptions are sufficient for him to handle the de dicto / de re ambiguities. So, for example, in the general case, the sentence "George IV wondered whether Scott is Sir Walter" can be interpreted as:

George IV wondered whether the x that... is identical to the y that....

where "..." stands for some definite description such as "the clever fellow who wrote Ivanhoe" and ....stands for something like "the elegant gentleman seated next to the Princess". In the de re case, the above sentence can be interpreted as follows instead:

the x that... is such that King George wondered whether x is identical to the y that....

=== Fictional names ===
Finally, Russell suggests that fictional names such as "Apollo" can be treated as abbreviated definite descriptions that refer to nothing. All propositions that contain names of such fictional entities are to be treated in the same manner as the negative existentials described above.

== Criticisms ==
In his essay, "On Referring", P. F. Strawson criticised Russell's characterisation of statements where the object does not exist, such as "the present King of France", as being wrong. Such statements, Strawson held, are neither true nor false but, rather, absurd. Strawson believed that, contrary to Russell, use does determine the meaning of a sentence. To give the meaning of an expression is to "give general directions for its use." Because of this, Strawson argued that, were someone to say the King of France was wise, we would not say their statement is true or false, but, rather, decide they must be under a misapprehension since, normally, the question would not arise as there is no King of France.

Strawson also argued that we often need to know the use of a word to understand its meaning, such as in statements of the form, "The table is covered with books." In normal use, the expression would be referring to one particular table. It is false, Strawson believed, to think, as Russell does, that the phrase will have meaning only insofar as there is only one table and no more. The phrase has application in virtue of the fact that one table and no more is what is being referred to, and it is understood that the table is what is being referenced.

== Publication data ==
- Russell, Bertrand (October 1905). "On Denoting". Mind. 14 (4): 479–493. doi:10.1093/mind/XIV.4.479. JSTOR 2248381.
