= Dale Jacquette =

American philosopher

Dale Jacquette (April 19, 1953 – August 22, 2016) was an American analytic philosopher, born in Sheboygan, Wisconsin.

At the time of his death, he was Professor Ordinarius of Philosophy at the University of Bern. Jacquette had previously served on the faculty of Penn State University. He received his undergraduate degree in philosophy from Oberlin College in 1975, and his PhD in the same subject from Brown University in 1983, writing a dissertation on the logic of intention supervised by Roderick Chisholm. Jacquette had broad research interests in the philosophy of intentionality, logic, metaphysics, philosophy of mind, Wittgenstein, ethics, aesthetics, epistemology, and the history of philosophy. A prolific writer, Jacquette published books on Meinong, logic, cannabis, psychologism, and the ethics of capital punishment in the final decade of his life. He was a defender of Aristotelian realist philosophy of mathematics.
