= Koffka =

Origin
- Languages: Yiddish, Slavic, German(ized)
- Meaning: from Jewish given name "Kovka (Kovke, Kofke)" Ya'aqov
- Region of origin: Germany

Other names
- Variant forms: Kovka, Koffke, Kufka, Kuffka; Koftka; Koffke is a non-Jewish German surname mentioned in Eastern Germany; Similar forms: Kavka (Kafka, Kaffka, Kawka); Kubka, Kupka (Western Slavic forms)

Koffka is a surname of German and Central European origin. Notable people with the name include:

- Else Koffka (1901–1994), German judge and lawyer
- Friedrich Koffka (1888–1951), German judge
- Kurt Koffka (1886–1941), German psychologist and professor
