= The Mentality of Apes =

Book by Wolfgang Köhler

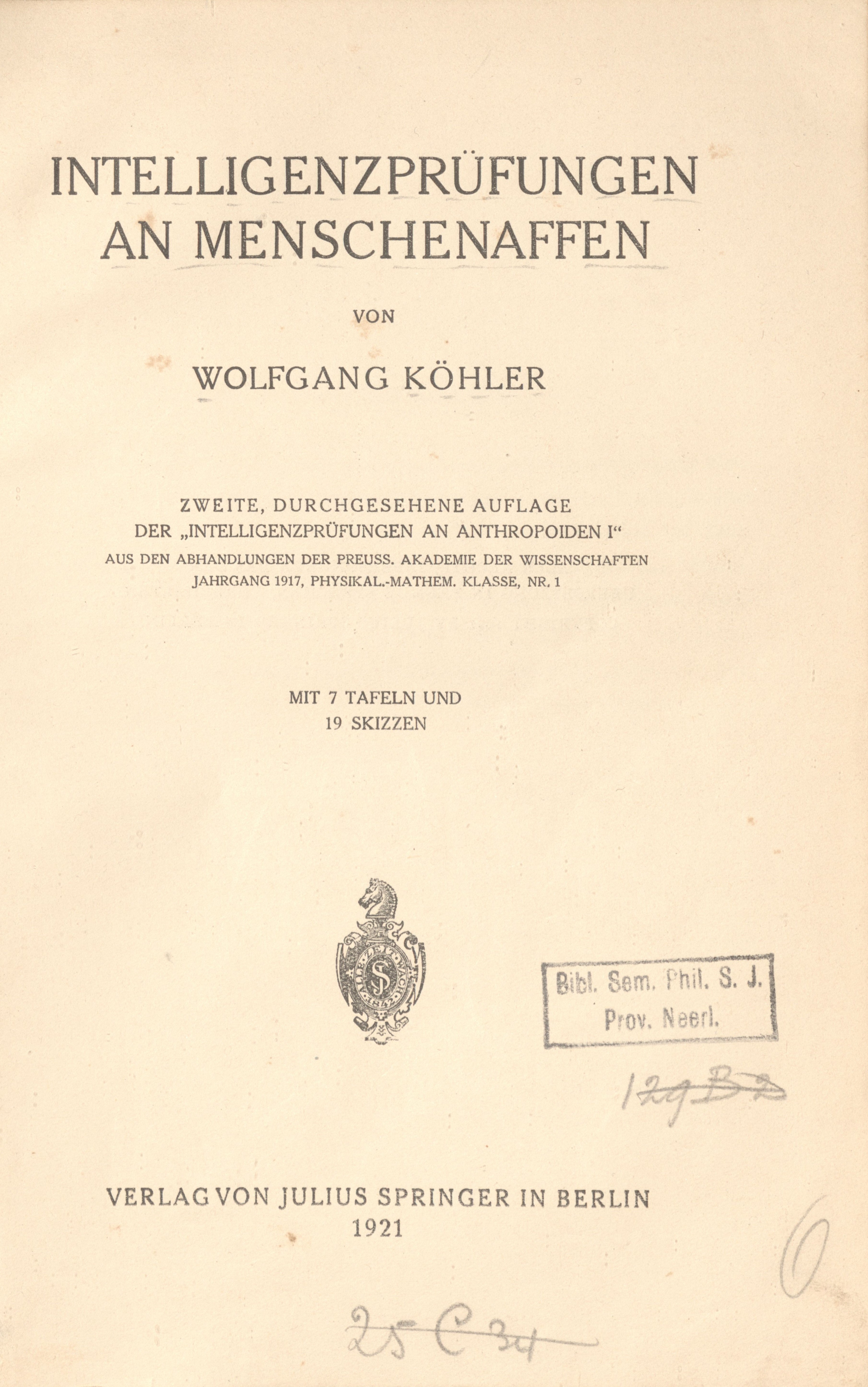
- Title page
- Author: Wolfgang Köhler
- Original title: Intelligenzprüfungen an Menschenaffen
- Translator: Ella Winter
- Language: German
- Genre: Non-fiction
- Publication date: 1921
- English publication date: 1925

Intelligenzprüfungen an Menschenaffen (literally translated: Intelligence tests on great apes) is a book by Wolfgang Köhler published in 1921. The English version called "The Mentality of Apes", translated by Ella Winter, was published in 1925.

With the book Köhler showed that chimpanzees could solve problems by insight. The importance of this work was to show there is no absolute dividing line between the human species and their nearest living relative, at least in this respect. The insights of Köhler's book had a profound and lasting impact on studies in psychology, primatology, creativity and many other fields.

== Context ==
Before Köhler's work, the field of comparative psychology was revolutionised by Charles Darwin, proposing evolutionary continuity between humans and other animals. In the 19th century Darwin wrote about the possible reasoning abilities of animals. In the early 20th century, further influential research was among others published by Edward Thorndike, who investigated learning abilities of apes and other animals. The Thorndiken view explained animal intelligence with stimulus-response associations, limiting animal learning to trial and error learning. At the same time Robert Yerkes, studying animals' intelligence and Leonard Hobhouse, who described sudden problem-solving abilities in monkeys, opposed these proposals of Thorndike. Hobhouse's experimental results were in favour of apes being able to learn by imitation. Together with a broader shift in the perception of animal intelligence, these different researchers provided the base for Köhler's studies on anthropoid apes. Köhler conducted experiments similar to those of Hobhouse.

Köhler with a background in many disciplines (philosophy, history, natural science, and experimental psychology) finished his doctorate under the supervision of Carl Stumpf at the Berlin Psychological Institute. In 1913, Stumpf offered him the directorship of the Anthropoid Station in Tenerife, which he accepted. Stumpf had considered Köhler for the position already in 1912 but ruled him out due to missing experience in animal psychology research. Before and after his stay in Tenerife Köhler created and contributed to the movement of Gestalt psychology together with his contemporaries Kurt Koffka and Max Wertheimer.

The experiments described in the book were conducted at the Anthropoid Station in Tenerife. The station was conceptualized by Max Rothmann and funded by the Royal Prussian Academy of Sciences. In 1912 most of the chimpanzees arrived, by a shipment from Cameroon, then a German colony. The first director was Eugen Teuber, followed by Köhler as the second and last director, due to influences of World War I. The station's research was not unaffected by World War I. Köhler was obliged to stay on the island until 1920, five years longer than planned. The station was suspected of espionage and the estate was subsequently sold by the owner, leading to a relocation of the research station to a nearby estate in 1918.

During his prolonged stay on the island, he wrote about his experiments. Between 1915 and 1921 he published four papers on his primate research. One of these was reprinted and retitled in the book Intelligenzprüfungen an Menschenaffen.

By 1920, financial difficulties in post-war Germany forced the cessation of experiments, and Köhler returned to Berlin. The station was officially closed in the same year.

== Contents ==
In Intelligenzprüfungen an Menschenaffen, Köhler documents his experiments with chimpanzees at the Tenerife station. Köhler's methodology involved presenting chimpanzees with a desired target out of reach, requiring creative problem-solving from the apes. For example, reaching some fruit by making use of a stick or a box. He thoroughly observed and documented the apes' behaviours and the strategies they used to solve these tasks.

The introduction highlights the importance and generalisability of the work suggesting similarities between apes and humans. Köhler points out large individual differences between apes and describes their individual characteristics, which he compares to personalities. One chimpanzee, Sultan, he noted was particularly adept at problem-solving.

The following chapters structured by the experimental set-ups, exploring the apes' abilities to find correct ways around obstacles, their tool use in various manners and also building tools and towers of boxes. The book highlights the difference between genuine achievements and coincidental problem-solving. Köhler observed and analysed that apes could use tools and exhibit insight. In contrast to Thorndike's publications, Köhler's research emphasised that apes showed forms of problem-solving beyond trial-and-error learning, highlighting the cognitive similarities between apes and humans. He emphasises his observation that a genuine solution, is preceded by a perceptual stage, such as an ape carefully looking around.

== Editions ==
The book was published in multiple editions with the various editions each having a different title:

1. 1917. Intelligenzprüfungen an Anthropoiden. Berlin: Royal Prussian Society of Sciences.
2. 1921. Intelligenzprüfungen an Menschenaffen. Berlin: Springer (called a 'second edition', but the first was a two-part whole issue journal publication 1918/19).
3. 1925. The Mentality of Apes. Translated from the second revised edition by Ella Winter. London: Kegan Paul, Trench, Trubner. U.S. edition 1925 by Harcourt, Brace & World. Also included is a translation of Köhler's long 1921 paper as Some contributions to the psychology of chimpanzees. Appendix, p281–342.

== Reception ==
Gabriel Ruiz and Natividad Sánchez from the University of Seville examined Köhler's experiments in the context of the animal psychology of his time with the aim of assessing the historical significance of Köhler's book. With regard to its reception, the researchers concluded, "The impact and historical relevance of Köhler’s Intelligenzprüfungen an Menschenaffen is utterly undeniable".

At first the influence of the book was limited, due to the ongoing war in Europe and the highly specialised nature of the topic. Following the English translation in 1925, the book attracted international attention and interest. Over the course of the 20th century, it became a seminal text in the field of comparative psychology, significantly influencing the study of apes. The increased interest was "followed by nearly a century of German primate research, observations of gorillas in Germany’s sophisticated zoos, and public funding for the study of primates." In other countries, the work of Köhler was built upon by Ivan Pavlov, who replicated the experiments, critiquing them and publishing alternative explanations for ape behaviour.

The influence of the book was also the basis for the Jane Goodall's work in primatology in the 1960s. In contrast to Köhler's experiments on chimpanzees in captivity, Jane Goodall studied the behaviour of chimpanzees in the wild. Köhler believed that similar studies could be performed on young children, and that future research should focus on these possibilities. Child intelligence studies followed in the mid 20th century, among others by Jean Piaget, who had valued Köhler's works.

The reception of Köhler's works slightly changed with the translation of the German word Einsicht into insight, which is used within the book. Insight suggested a hypothetical mechanism by which apes solve a problem, which was not expressed in the original version. The term insight was thus introduced into problem-solving research and received much attention in the field of creativity research.

The publication is said to have further influenced Clark Hull in the development of his theory of learning.

In recognition of Köhler's contributions, the Tenerife station has been memorialised and the Wolfgang Köhler Primate Research Centre (WKPRC) in Leipzig has been established to promote research on non-human primates. This centre underlines the lasting legacy in the field of primate cognition stemming from the book.

Köhler himself abstained from further research in the field of animal studies. The unexpected isolation on Tenerife for six years led to feelings of frustration, and he was unmotivated to continue his research in Germany. Köhler instead pursued his interest in Gestalt psychology.
