= Friedrich Schumann (psychologist) =

German psychologist

Friedrich Schumann (1863–1940) was a German psychologist.

== Education and career ==
Friedrich Schumann habilitated in 1892 with Georg Elias Müller in Göttingen. From 1894 to 1905, he was assistant to Carl Stumpf in Berlin. In 1904, he was a founding member of the "Society for Experimental Psychology" in Giessen (renamed "German Psychological Society" in 1929). From 1905 to 1910, he was professor of philosophy in Zürich and director of the psychological laboratory. After the death of Hermann Ebbinghaus (1909), he was co-editor of the "Journal of psychology and physiology of the senses". From 1910 to 1929, he headed the Institute of Psychology in Frankfurt. Led by Schumann, the experimental psychological laboratory in Frankfurt made an important contribution to the formation of the Frankfurt and Berlin School of Gestalt psychology (Max Wertheimer, Kurt Goldstein, Wolfgang Köhler, Kurt Koffka).
