= Otto Kalischer =

German anatomist and neurologist (1869–1942)

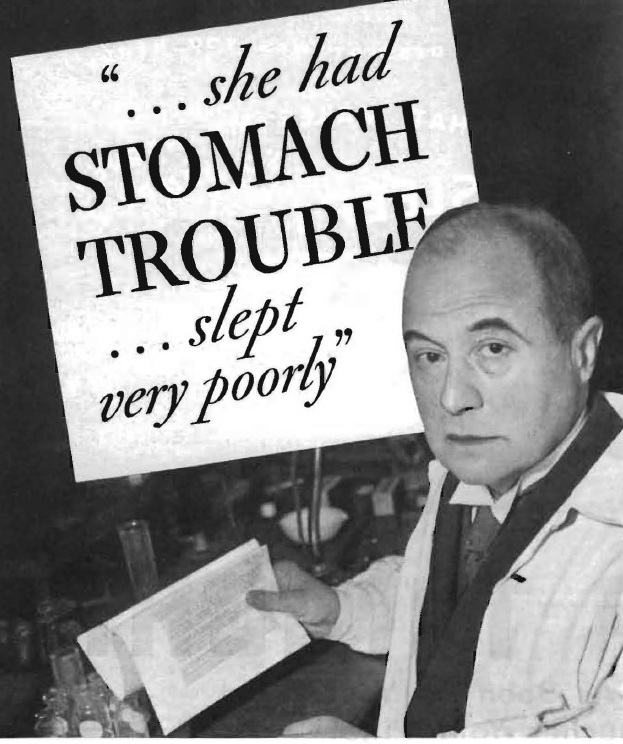
Otto Kalischer. Photograph from a newspaper ad for Charles L. Fleischmann's yeast.

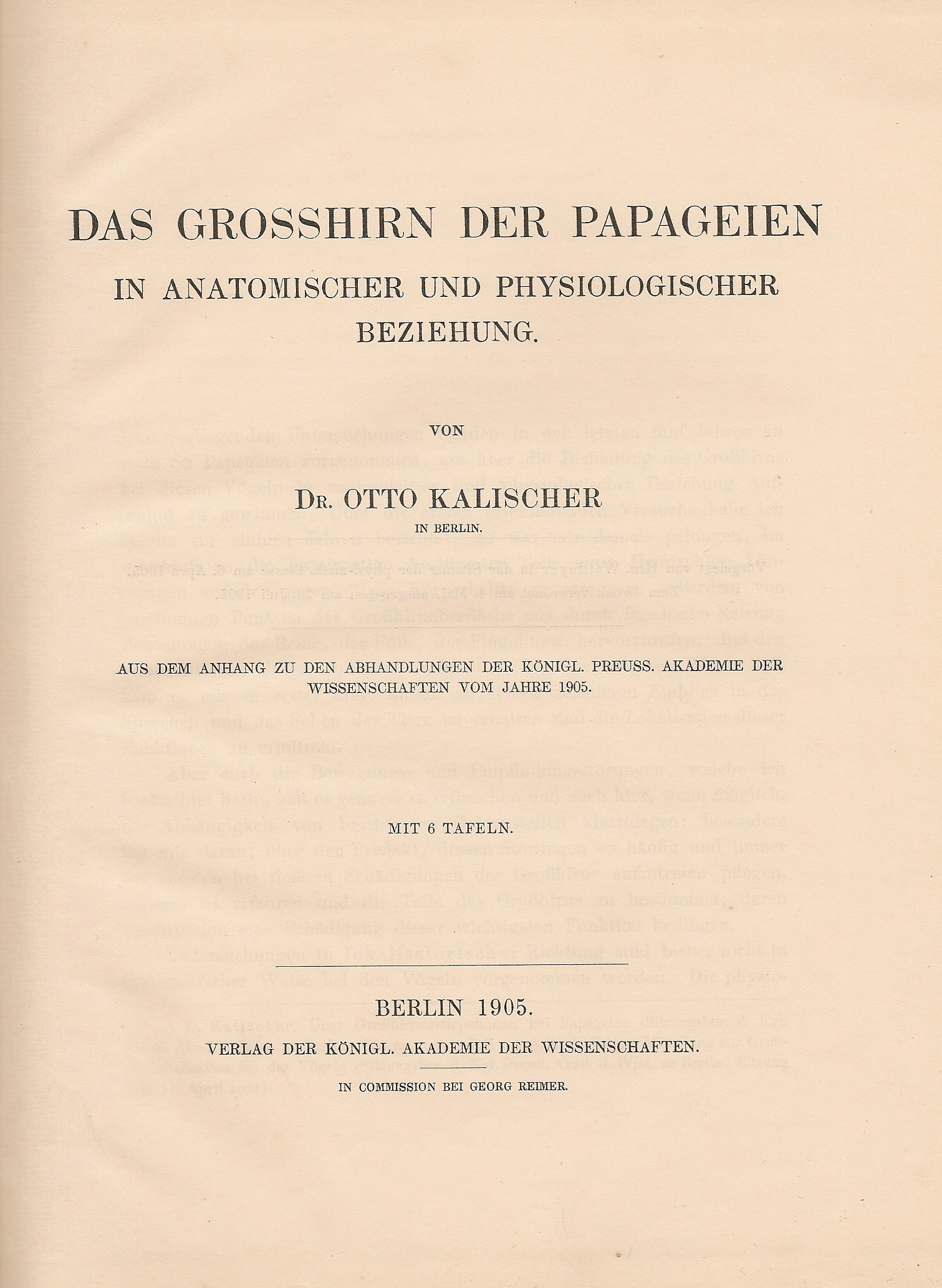
Das Grosshirn der Papageien in anatomischer und physiologischer Beziehung (1905)

Otto Kalischer (1869 – 1942) was a German anatomist and neurologist.

== Life ==
He was born on April 23, 1869 in what was then Berlin, Kingdom of Prussia. He was the son of physician Adolf Kalischer (1833–1893) and his wife Clara née Franck, (1833-after 1921). He had brother Georg (1873–1938) and sister Else. His cousin Siegfried Kalischer (1862–1954) was neurologist too.

He studied medicine in Freiburg im Breisgau and wrote his doctoral dissertation "Über die Nierenveränderungen bei Scharlach" in 1891. Afterwards he was active as Assistantarzt (resident) in Hanau. From 1895 he worked in Anatomischen Institut in Berlin under Heinrich Wilhelm Waldeyer (1836–1921).

According to the Gedenkbuch published by the German Federal Archies, Otto Kalischer perished in Berlin on August 14, 1942, by his own hand.

== Research and controversy ==
In 1900, Kalischer published a monograph "Die Urogenitalmuskulatur des Dammes mit besonderer Berücksichtigung des Harnblasenverschlusses" ("The urogenital musculature of the perineum with special regards to the closure of the urinary bladder"). He undertook very careful anatomical investigation of urogenital muscles by means of continuous serial sections, and described these structures in great detail. He stated, that the internal sphincter consists of trigonal muscle and no detrusor urinae muscle. Kalischer coined the term musculus sphincter urogenitalis for the skeletal urethral sphincter and introduced the concept of the trigonal sphincter (the extension of the deep trigone). His work is cited even today in medical publications.

Between 1900 and 1905, he published series of works on the neuroanatomy of birds. He searched for brain sites related to avian vocal behavior and performed both left and bilateral hemisphere lesions on sixty Amazon parrots. He placed these lesions on the lateral surface of the brain, an area that he thought would be homologous to the temporal lobe (and Broca area) of humans. In following stimulation experiments he observed the movements of legs, jaw, and eyelids. It has been estimated retrospectively, that Kalischer’s lesions probably damaged both robust nucleus of archistriatum (RA) and the hyperstriatum ventrale, pars caudalis (HVc). Kalischer postulated a pyramidal tract in birds. He was also among the first to prove that striatal rather than cortical areas are involved in avian intelligence

During his career, he collaborated with Max Lewandowsky (1876–1918) (they wrote together a report of the disappearance of contralateral thermosensitivity after spinal cord hemisection in the dog), Louis Jacobsohn-Lask (1863–1941) and Max Rothmann (1868–1915). In 1919 he wrote obituary essay for prematurely deceased Lewandowsky.

During the February 21, 1907 meeting of the Physical-Mathematical Section of the Prussian Academy of Sciences Kalischer reported some experiments which he had carried on for the purpose of testing the relation between the temporal cortex and tone-perception in dogs. He purposed particularly to test experimentally the earlier conclusion of Hermann Munk regarding the function of this area. Munk proved that the canine centre for tone is placed in the temporal lobe and perception of the high tones is conditioned by the function of the anterior part of the centre, while that of the deeper tones depends on the activity of the posterior region. Kalischer trained his dogs to take food upon the sounding of a given tone and to refrain from seizing it upon the sounding of any other. The food was either held in the experimenter's hand before the dog or laid on a chair by which the experimenter stood. The tones were sounded first on the organ used by Munk, which contained nine pipes, the octaves from C1 to c7. Later he substituted the piano and still later the harmonium, finding the latter best suited to his purposes. The daily tests on each animal were arranged about as follows: Kalischer struck a certain tone and as long as it sounded fed the animal bits of meat from the hand. In the first two daily experiments he sounded only the one food-tone, so that he might accustom the animal to being fed at the sound. The daily test on each animal lasted not longer than five or six minutes.

Kalischer attempted two control-tests. He made some of his dogs temporarily blind, by sewing their eyelids together and reported, that the accuracy of discrimination was not affected. He also destroyed one cochlea in some other "well-trained dogs", and also reported no disturbance. When the other cochlea was destroyed, all discrimination ceased. Dogs subjected to extirpation of both cochlea before any training was attempted did not learn to discriminate at all. Kalischer regarded this as evidence that the other dogs had ignored extraauditory stimuli.

Harry Miles Johnson in 1913 criticised Kalischer's procedure for the design of experiment and incomplete data presented. He wrote:

"Kalischer does not tell us how many trials he gave the animals at each daily test, nor how many trials altogether were required to achieve perfection. Data on both of these questions are highly desirable in reports of behavior experiments (...) It would have been much better if Kalischer had applied some form of control tests with the experimenter and others as well out of the room".

The heaviest criticism came from George Windholz (1931–2002) in 1993. He stated that Kalischer was evidently influenced by the research of the Pavlovians on the conditioned reflex method. He cited Maiorov who maintained that Kalischer and Georg Friedrich Nicolai were coworkers. He summarized his article as follows:

"When Kalischer initially described the Dressur method [...] he, by failing to refer to the work of Graber, Lubbock, Thorndike, and Himstedt, assigned to himself the priority for the discovery of the discrimination method. [...] [H]e should have acknowledged that the sensory discrimination method had been used by fellow German scientists Graber and Himstedt. [...] Apparently Kalischer convinced himself of having discovered a new sensory discrimination method, the Dressur. [...] Kalischer might have been so impressed by his presumed discovery that he became insensitive to the need to acknowledge the work of other researchers who contributed to the discovery of discrimination. Kalischer must have blinded himself by his desire for priority in the discovery of this method. However, even given the murky situation with respect to discrimination, it becomes obvious that priority does not go to Kalischer. Rather, in our view, priority should be awarded to Graber, who outlined the sensory discrimination experimental design, and to Thorndike, who followed this design".

Firkin and Whitworth in Dictionary of medical eponyms incorrectly attribute one of the first descriptions of Sturge-Weber disease to Otto Kalischer; however, it was Siegfried Kalischer, Otto's cousin, who described the pathology of this disease in 1899.

=== Works ===
- "Über die Nierenveränderungen bei Scharlach [On the changing of the kidneys during scarlatina]" (1891)
- "Über die Nerven der Harnblase, des Uterus und der Vagina [On the nerves of the urinary bladder, the uterus and the vagina]". Sitzungsberichte der preussischen Akademie der Wissenschaften zu Berlin 37/38 p. 947—950 (1894)
- "Ueber den normalen und pathologischen Zehen-Reflex [On the normal and pathological toe reflex]". Virchow Arch. f. pathologische Anat. u. Physiol 155, p. 486-506 (1889)
- "Die Urogenitalmuskulatur des Dammes mit besonderer Berücksichtigung des Harnblasenverschlusses [The urogenital musculature of the perineum with special regards to the closure of the urinary bladder]". S. Karger, Berlin 1900
- "Weitere Mittheilungen zur Großhirnextirpation bei Papageien [Further notes on the cerebral extirpation in parrots]". Fortschritte der Med 18 (33), 641-644. Zeitschrift für Psychologie und Physiologie der Sinnesorgane 26: 421 (1900)
- "Ueber Großhirnextirpationen bei Papageien [On cerebral extirpation in parrots]". Sitzungsberichte der preussischen Akademie der Wissenschaften zu Berlin 34 (5. Juli), p. 722-726 (1900)
- "Weitere Mittheilung zur Grosshirnlocalisation bei den Vögeln [Further notes on the localisation of the cerebrum in birds]". Berlin Kön-preuss. Akad. d. Wissensch 12 pp. (1901)
- "Das Grosshirn der Papageien in anatomischer und physiologischer Beziehung [The cerebrum of parrots with respects to anatomy and physiology]". Preuss Akad Wiss Berl Berlin 1905, 4°, 105 pp.
- "Zur Funktion des Schläfenlappens des Grosshirns. Eine neue Hörprüfungsmethode bei Hunden; zugleich ein Beitrag zur Dressur als physiologischer Untrsuchungsmethode [The functioning of the temporal lobe of the cerebrum. A new method to test hearing in dogs; also a contribution on the role of memory training as a method of physiological examination]". Sitzungsberichte d Kgl Akad d Wissenschaft X (1907)
- Kalischer O, Lewandowsky M. "Über die Anwendung der Dressurmethode zur Bestimmung der Leitung im Rückenmark. (Vorläufige Mittelung) [On the application of memory training to determine the conduction within the spinal cord. (Temporal note)]". Zentralbl f. Physiol. Äl 21 (1907)
- "Weitere Mitteilungen über die Ergebnisse der Dressur als physiologische Untersuchungsmethode auf dem Gebiete des Gehör-, Geschmack- und Farbessinns [Further notes on the results of memory training as a means of physiological examination regarding the senses of hearing, gustation and colour perception]". [Extract from] Archiv für Anatomie und Physiologie. Physiol. Abteilung (1909)
- "Über die Bedeutung des Stirnteils des Grosshirns für die Fresstondressur [On the importance of the frontal part of the cerebrum for the memory training to start eating at a sound signal]". Zbl Physiol 24, 716–718 (1910)
- "Experimentelle Physiologie des Großhirns [Experimental physiology of the cerebrum]". [in:] Handbuch der Neurologie, vol. 1 (ed. Max Lewandowsky) Berlin, J. Springer, 1911, pp. 365–416
- "Über die Bedeutung der Dressurmethode für die Erforschung des Nervensystems [On the importance of memory training for researching the nervous system]". J Neurol doi:10.1007/BF01629369 (1912)
- "Über die Tondressur der Affen [On the memory training of monkeys to start eating at sound signals]". Zentralblatt für Physiologie 26, 255-265 (1912)
- "Dem Andenken an Ernst Weber [In memoriam Ernst Weber]". Klinische Wochenschrift 4, 10, s. 479 (1925) doi:10.1007/BF01850942
