= Kafkas =

Kafkas may refer to:

- Kafkas University
- Nazlı Eda Kafkas (born 2001), volleyball player
- Tolunay Kafkas (born 1968), football manager and former player

== See also ==
- Kafka (disambiguation)
