= Sultan (chimpanzee) =

Chimpanzee used for psychological research

- Species: Chimpanzee

Sultan (c. 1907 – 28 February 1923) was a chimpanzee tested by the Gestalt psychologist Wolfgang Köhler at the Prussian Academy of Sciences' anthropoid research station on Tenerife, and the best known of the animals whose problem-solving Köhler reported in The Mentality of Apes (1925; German original, 1921). Sultan is particularly recognized for his insight in solving numerous problems, including stacking or manipulating boxes to reach a reward and use of two sticks as a unit to take food to a reachable distance.

Caught in the wild in southern Cameroon, Sultan reached Tenerife in September 1912. When the station closed in 1920, he was sold with five other chimpanzees to the Berlin Zoological Garden, where the whole troop died within about three years. Sultan, the only male, outlived the rest and died in February 1923; his skin survives at the Museum für Naturkunde in Berlin, where it was relocated in 2026.

== Origins and Tenerife ==
Sultan belonged to the subspecies Pan troglodytes ellioti. He was taken from the wild in southern Cameroon, then the German colony of Kamerun, by colonial forces near Yaoundé or Ebolowa and reached the Prussian Academy of Sciences' anthropoid station on Tenerife in September 1912 with Chica, Grande, Rana, Tercera, and Tschego. He was then about five years old. Köhler directed the station from 1914 to 1920 and ran there the problem-solving experiments for which Sultan is known. The First World War stranded Köhler on the island for nearly six years.

== Problem-solving experiments ==
While other chimpanzees in Köhler's study were also quite adept at problem-solving—namely, obtaining an out-of-reach fruit suspended above a playground or perched just beyond arm's reach outside the bars of a cage—Sultan proved to be peculiarly advanced. He and his peers were also known to stack crates to reach the fruit, and even scramble up a hastily balanced stick to grab the banana before falling back down.

Chimpanzees helped Köhler to prove that animals are capable of learning beyond simple trial and error, and that, given the right conditions, many species—particularly the more "human" species of primates—will demonstrate a deeper understanding of the constituents of a problem. For example, several chimpanzees who had proven capable of reaching the banana via a stack of crates found that in a crateless room, a table or chair worked to meet the same end.

== Transfer to Berlin ==
Postwar inflation, the loss of the station's lease, and a British espionage investigation led Köhler to ask for his recall in March 1920. The Academy sold Sultan and the five other surviving chimpanzees to the Berlin Zoological Garden for 33,772 marks plus transport. A condition of the sale was that they remained available for scientific research and were not to be trained for circus performance. They were taken in cages aboard the steamer Borga; Köhler met them at Rotterdam on 17 October 1920 and escorted them to Berlin. The German press named the chimpanzees, the Teneriffa Schimpansen. Sultan and the other chimpanzees were housed initially in a heated room above the zoo's aquarium and then later in the old ape house, in a corner that came to be called the Kap Teneriffa.

== Death and remains ==
Sultan fell ill during the winter of 1922–23 and died in February 1923 of tonsillitis. Under a 1921 agreement between the Academy and the zoo, dead animals from the Tenerife colony went to the Museum für Naturkunde. His skin was given a catalog entry on 28 February 1923. However, its location was mislaid. In 2026, it was rediscovered and found to retain DNA suitable for analysis.

== See also ==
- List of individual apes
