= Michael Wertheimer (psychologist) =

American psychologist (1927–2022)

- Born: Michael Matthew Wertheimer; March 20, 1927; Berlin, Brandenburg, Prussia, Germany
- Died: December 23, 2022 (aged 95)
- Citizenship: American
- Education: Swarthmore College; Johns Hopkins University; Harvard University
- Spouses: Nancy MacKaye (m. 1950; div. 1965) Marilyn Schuman (m. 1970)
- Awards: American Psychological Foundation Distinguished Teaching Award (1983)
- Scientific career
- Fields: Psychology
- Institutions: University of Colorado Boulder
- Thesis: A study of normal threshold variations in time (1952)

Michael Matthew Wertheimer (March 20, 1927 – December 23, 2022) was a German-born American psychologist and Professor Emeritus at the University of Colorado Boulder. His research focused on cognition, psycholinguistics, and the history of psychology, among other areas.

== Early life and education ==
Wertheimer was born on March 20, 1927, in Berlin, Germany. He emigrated to the United States with his family in September 1933 and became a naturalized citizen of the United States in April 1939. He graduated from Swarthmore College in 1947 (where the Gestalt psychologist Wolfgang Köhler, a German colleague of his father, was teaching) with a BA in psychology with high honors. He received his MA from Johns Hopkins University in psychology in 1949 and his PhD in experimental psychology from Harvard University in 1952.

== Career ==
Wertheimer first became a professor of psychology at the University of Colorado Boulder in 1955, and he retained this title until his retirement in 1993. He was a member of the Condon Committee. He served as president of the Society for the Teaching of Psychology and the Rocky Mountain Psychological Association. His awards included American Psychological Foundation Distinguished Teaching Award in 1983, the APA Distinguished Career Contributions to Education and Training in Psychology Award in 1990, and the American Psychology Association's (APA) Award for Outstanding Contributions to Theoretical and Philosophical Psychology in 2009. He was inducted to PSI CHI International Honor Society for Psychology. He published numerous books and articles, concluding with his personal memoir, Facets of an Academic's Life (2020).

== Personal life ==
Wertheimer was the son of Max Wertheimer, one of the founders of Gestalt psychology. His mother, Anni (née Caro), came from a family of doctors, including her father and an uncle, Ludwig Pick. Wertheimer's parents divorced in 1942, when he was 15. In 1950 Wertheimer married Nancy MacKaye, a research scientist in her own right; they had three children together before their divorce in January 1965. He married Marilyn Schuman in September 1970.
