= Kawka =

Kawka may refer to:

- Kawka, Lublin Voivodeship, Poland
- Kawka, Pomeranian Voivodeship, Poland

== See also ==
- Kavka
- Kafka (disambiguation)
