= Koffka ring =

Geometric optical illusion

Figure 1

Figure 2

Figure 3

The Koffka ring is a geometric optical illusion discovered by the German psychologist Kurt Koffka.

Figures 1 to 3 each show a circular ring colored a uniform shade of gray, the lower half of which is on a black background and the upper half on a white background.

In Figure 1, the gray ring is separated from the background by a black line. This makes the upper half of the ring appear darker than the lower half. In Figure 2, this dividing line is missing. As a result, the contrast illusion almost completely disappears.

The more pronounced the separation of the areas, the stronger the contrast illusion. If, for example, the two ring halves are shifted so that they are completely separated, the illusion becomes particularly noticeable, as shown in Figure 3.

The reason for this contrast illusion lies in the fact that human perception amplifies differences in brightness between adjacent surfaces.

== Literature ==
- Kurt Koffka: Principles of Gestalt Psychology Lund Humphries, London, 1935
- Abigail E. Huang1, Alice J. Hon, Eric Lewin Altschuler: Koffka’s Ring Effect Depends on Thickness, Not Continuity, School of Medicine, Department of Physical Medicine and Rehabilitation, University of Medicine & Dentistry of New Jersey, Newark, New Jersey, December 2007
