= Berlin school of experimental psychology =

The Berlin school of experimental psychology was founded by Carl Stumpf, a pupil of Franz Brentano and Hermann Lotze and a professor at the University of Berlin, in 1893. It adhered to the method of experimental phenomenology, which understood it as the science of phenomena. It is also noted as the originator of Gestalt psychology. Noted members include Max Wertheimer, Kurt Koffka, and Wolfgang Köhler.

== History ==
Stumpf founded the Berlin Laboratory of Experimental Psychology in 1893. The institute, which is also known as the school of Gestalt psychology, was part of the University of Berlin. It was a refinement of Brentano's neo-Aristotelian theory or the study of phenomena's qualitative properties. After the German revolution, the Berlin laboratory relocated to a wing of the former Imperial Palace. This marked the expansion of the Berlin school after it was forced to reduce its operations during the war. The new facility, which was also supported by the Society for Experimental Psychology, focused on applied work and incorporated its own laboratory so that it became an expanded university institute. Stumpf was the chair of the institute for 26 years. He was succeeded by Wolfgang Köhler.

Stumpf influenced his pupils such as Wertheimer, Koffka, Köhler, and Kurt Lewin, and these contributed to the school's development. Lewin, for instance, developed a set of models and ideas linked to change management theory and practice. These psychologists further refined Stumpf's work, which facilitated experimental investigation that culminated in the development of Gestalt psychology. These psychologists stressed the primacy of objects as units of experience, instead of sensations.

Only after Köhler took over the direction of the psychology institute in 1922 did the Berlin School effectively become a school for Gestalt psychology.

== See also ==
- The Graz School founded by Alexius Meinong
- The School of Brentano
