= Siegfried Kalischer =

German neurologist and researcher

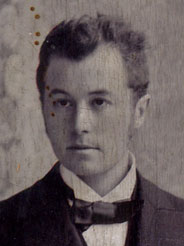
Siegfried Kalischer. Berlin, circa 1900

Siegfried Kalischer (7 May 1862, Thorn – 31 March 1954, Copenhagen) was a German neurologist and researcher.

A cousin of anatomist and neurologist Otto Kalischer, Siegfried studied medicine at universities in Berlin and Würzburg, and graduated from the Friedrich-Wilhelms-Universität in 1885 with the dissertation "Zur Frage über den Einfluss der erblichen Belastung auf Entwicklung, Verlauf und Prognose der Geistesstörungen". In 1891, he became the head of the clinic for nervous diseases in Berlin-Schlachtensee.

His research provided the first pathological evidence for William Allen Sturge's hypothesis about the port-wine stain characteristic of what is presently known as Sturge-Weber syndrome (SKW). Historically, the condition was sometimes known as Sturge–Kalischer–Weber–Dimitri syndrome.

He served on the editorial board of Jahresbericht über die Leistungen und Fortschritte auf dem Gebiete von Neurologie und Psychiatrie.

His notable patients included the Hungarian minister of finance Loránt Hegedüs and Martha Fontane, daughter of the writer Theodor Fontane.

Kalischer emigrated to Denmark in the 1930s. He died in Copenhagen on 31 March 1954, aged 91.

== Works ==
- Zur Frage über den Einfluss der erblichen Belastung auf Entwicklung, Verlauf und Prognose der Geistesstörungen. Berlin: Jacoby, 1885
- Ein Fall von subacuter nuclearer Ophthalmoplegie und Extremitätenlähmung mit Obductionsbefund. (Polio-Mesencephalo-Myelitis subacuta). Deutsche Zeitschrift für Nervenheilkunde 6, 3–4, s. 252-312 (1895) doi:10.1007/BF01673516
- Ein Fall von (Influenza-) Psychose im frühesten Kindesalter. Archiv für Psychiatrie und Nervenkrankheiten 29, 1, S. 231-248 (1896) doi:10.1007/BF02961679
- Ueber angeborene Muskeldefecte. Neurologisches Centralblatt 15, s. 685 (1896)
- Zur Casuistik der asthenischen (Bulbär-) Paralyse oder Myasthenia pseudoparalytica. Deutsche Zeitschrift für Nervenheilkunde 10, 3–4, s. 321-334 (1897) doi:10.1007/BF01668175
- Demonstration des Gehirns eines kindes mit Teleangiektasie der linksseitigen Gesichts-Kopfhaut und Hirnoberflache. Berliner klinische Wochenschrift 34, s. 1059–1067 (1897)
- Was können wir für den Unterricht und die Erziehung unserer schwachbegabten und schwachsinnigen Kinder thun? Berlin, Oehmigke 1897 ss. 30
- Ein Fall von Zwangsvorstellungen und Berührungsangst im Kindesalter. Arch f Kinderheilk 24, 1–2, s. ?
- Über erbliche Tabes. Beil. klin. Wochenschr (1898)
- Ueber Mikrogyrie und Mikrophthalmie. Neurologisches Centralblatt 9, s. 398 (1899)
- Hirnhautangiom (Demonstration von mikroskopischen Präparaten). Neurologisches Centralblatt 23, s. 1114 (1899)
- Ueber Teleangiektasien bei spinaler Kinderlahmung. Monatsschr f Psychiatr. und Neurologie 6, s. 431 (?1899)
- Zur Prophylaxe der chronisehen Neurosen. Med-Ztg No. 101 (1899)
- Aphasie. Jahresbericht ueber die Leistungen und Fortschritte auf dem Gebiete der Neurologie und Psychiatrie (1900)
- Die Schlaflosigkeit und deren allgemeine Behandlung. Die Ärztliche Praxis 11 (1900)
- Über die Fürsorge für schwachbegabte Kinder. Neurologisches Centralblatt s. 475
- Ein Fall von Teleangiectasie (Angiom) des Gesichts und der weichen Hirnhaut. Archiv für Psychiatrie und Nervenkrankheiten 34, 1, s. 171-180 (1901) doi:10.1007/BF01960295
- Hirnhautangiom. Monatshefte fuer Praktische Dermatologie 32, s. 43-44 (1901)
- Aphasie. Jahresbericht ueber die Leistungen und Fortschritte auf dem Gebiete der Neurologie und Psychiatrie s. 365-370 (1906)
- Brücke und der Medulla oblongata. Jahresbericht ueber die Leistungen und Fortschritte auf dem Gebiete der Neurologie und Psychiatrie s. 559-567 (1906)
- Clinical Notes of a New Bromine Preparation. Clinical Excerpts 15, s. 85-87 (1909) link
- Erkrankungen der Brücke und der Medulla oblongata. Jahresbericht ueber die Leistungen und Fortschritte auf dem Gebiete der Neurologie und Psychiatrie 15, s. 594-600 (1912)
- Über die Grenzen der Psychotherapie. Jahresbericht über die Leistungen und Fortschritte auf dem Gebiete der Neurologie und Psychiatrie 20, s. 71-76 (1916)
- Angioma cerebri. Deutsche Medizinische Wochenschrift 48
- Ein neues Krankheitsbild (Radio-Manie). Radio-Umschau s. 326 (1925)
- Die Beziehungen der Tetanie zur Epilepsie. Archiv für Psychiatrie und Nervenkrankheiten 78, 1, S. 168-182 (1926) doi:10.1007/BF01996617
- Über die Neuralgie des N. phrenicus. Neuralgia phrenica oder diaphragmatica Klinische Wochenschrift 7, 7, S. 314-315 (1928) doi:10.1007/BF01850039
- Über ein Myelom des Schädeldaches und die Beziehungen der Myelome zu den Nervensystem. Zeitschrift für die gesamte Neurologie und Psychiatrie 117, s. 424 (1928)
- Über Myelome. [w:] Księga jubileuszowa Edwarda Flataua. Gebethner i Wolff, Warszawa 1929 s. 232–242
- Encephalitis Lethargica und Arteriosklerose. Klinische Wochenschrift 8, 17, s. 790-791 (1929) doi:10.1007/BF01737700
