= Max Wertheimer =

Austro-Hungarian psychologist (1880–1943)

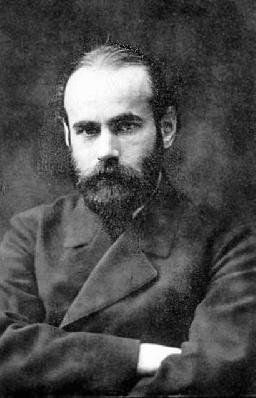
- Born: April 15, 1880; Prague, Austria-Hungary
- Died: October 12, 1943 (aged 63); New Rochelle, New York, U.S.
- Education: University of Würzburg (PhD, 1904); University of Prague
- Scientific career
- Fields: Psychology
- Workplaces: Frankfurt University; The New School
- Doctoral advisor: Oswald Külpe
- Doctoral students: Rudolf Arnheim, Erika Fromm, Kurt Lewin

Max Wertheimer (Austrian German: [maks ˈvɛrthaɪmɐ]; April 15, 1880 – October 12, 1943) was a psychologist who was one of the three founders of Gestalt psychology, along with Kurt Koffka and Wolfgang Köhler. He is known for his book Productive Thinking and for conceiving the phi phenomenon as part of his work in Gestalt psychology.

Wertheimer became interested in psychology and studied under Carl Stumpf at the University of Berlin. Wertheimer then went on to obtain his PhD in 1904 under Oswald Külpe, at the University of Würzburg and then began his intellectual career teaching at the Institute for Social Research at Frankfurt University. For 13 years, he left Frankfurt to work at the Berlin Psychological Institute, but returned in 1929 as a full professor.

Wertheimer eventually joined the faculty of The New School in New York, a position he held until his death. One of Wertheimer's postdoc researchers was the American psychologist Abraham Maslow who greatly admired Wertheimer.

== Early life (1880–1903) ==
Max Wertheimer was born on April 15, 1880, in Prague, then part of Austria-Hungary. He was born to Wilhelm and Rosa Wertheimer, second to his brother Walter. Wilhelm Wertheimer was an educator and financier. Rosa Wilhelm, born Rosa Zwicker, had a rich classical education. The Wertheimers were active in the Jewish community in which they lived. The Wertheimer household was extremely intellectual, therefore Max received education from both his parents; he engaged in political and educational discussions at home, as well as taking piano and violin lessons. After he received one of Baruch Spinoza's books as a gift, he developed an interest in philosophy. He felt that he and Spinoza shared a culture and common traits.

Wertheimer began his formal education aged five, at a private elementary school maintained by the Piarist order of the Roman Catholic Church. It was not uncommon at this time for Jewish children in central Europe to receive educations from the Catholic Church. Aged ten, he graduated from the Piarist Grammar School and enrolled in the Royal Imperial New City German State High School, where he could expect to obtain a degree that would qualify him for admittance to a university. Due to the diverse courses offered by the university, he began to contemplate his future, and realized his deep fascination with philosophy. He first began to study law at Charles University, where he also explored philosophy, and other fields such as music, physiology, and psychology. After a year, Max left and enrolled in University of Berlin where he shifted his study to philosophy. At Berlin, Max was able to work in the company of figures such as Carl Stumpf, Friederich Schumann, Georg Elias Müller, and Erich von Hornbostel. Later on, in 1903, he gained his PhD from the University of Würzburg. There he completed research on the lie detector.

== Time in Frankfurt and Berlin (1910–1933) ==
Max Wertheimer began his academic career at the Psychological Institute in Frankfurt, later to become the University of Frankfurt. From 1910 to 1916 he worked there and conducted pioneering experiments in the perception of motion and phi phenomenon. Wertheimer first founded his Gestalt theory before World War I, publishing his research on perception in "Experimental Studies on Motion Vision" in 1912. During World War I Wertheimer was a research psychologist with the Prussian Artillery Testing Commission, the center of which was located in the Bavarian Quarter of Berlin, close to Albert Einstein's house. Wertheimer's friendship with Einstein began at this time, in his visits he attempted to understand the Gestalt-like processes Einstein had used to conceive the theory of relativity. In the war years Wertheimer also became friends with physicist Max Born. After the war, Wertheimer united with Born and Einstein to negotiate the release of the rector and some professors at the University of Berlin who were being held by students and soldiers making socialist demands from the university.

After the war, he further advanced his Gestalt theory in collaboration with Wolfgang Köhler, Kurt Koffka, and others through the Weimar years. He left Frankfurt from 1916 to 1929 to work at the Berlin Psychological Institute. He gave lectures and pursued his research on perception and gestalt in the University of Berlin. In 1923, while teaching in Berlin, Wertheimer married Anna Caro (called Anni), a physician's daughter, with whom he had four children: Rudolf (who died in infancy, 1924), Valentin (1925–1978), Michael (1927–2022) and Lise (1928–2021, Lisbeth Rosa). He returned to Frankfurt in 1929 as a full professor, where he stayed until 1933.

== Time after leaving Germany (1933–1943) ==
In 1933, the change in Germany's government convinced Wertheimer to leave Germany. Hearing Adolf Hitler's declarations, he felt his Jewish roots placed him in danger. The Wertheimer family joined other German emigrees and moved to the United States. The Wertheimers' emigration was arranged through the U.S. consulate in Prague, and he and his wife and their children arrived in New York harbor on September 13, 1933. The family became citizens as well; that's why Max Wertheimer is referred to as a German-American psychologist. Along with his move to America, Wertheimer accepted a professional position at age fifty-three at the New School for Social Research in New York City. The New School had been founded only fourteen-years before when he gained the opportunity to teach courses there, remaining at the New School for the last decade of his life. From 1934–1940, Wertheimer wrote four major papers, philosophical essays on the topics of truth, ethics, democracy, and freedom which are all commonly grounded on gestalt ideas of the whole and its parts, and the importance of looking at the "total situation."

In America he remained in touch with his European colleagues, many of whom had also emigrated to America. Kurt Koffka was teaching at Smith College, Wolfgang Köhler at Swarthmore College, and Kurt Lewin at Cornell University and the University of Iowa. Although in declining health, Wertheimer continued to work on his research of problem-solving, which he preferred to call "productive thinking." Max and Anna Wertheimer divorced in 1942. He completed his only book, Productive Thinking, in late September 1943. He died from a heart attack just three weeks after the book's completion at his home in New Rochelle, New York. Wertheimer is interred in Beechwoods Cemetery, also in New Rochelle. He was the father of Michael Wertheimer, also a psychologist.

== Phi phenomenon ==
Max Wertheimer began the formal founding of Gestalt psychology in 1910 as he began experiments on the phi phenomenon. He published these experiments in a paper titled "Experimental Studies on the Perception of Movement". The phi phenomenon is apparent movement caused by alternating light positions. Wertheimer illustrated this phenomenon on an apparatus he built that utilized two discrete lights on different locations. Although the lights are stationary, flashing the lights at succeeding time intervals causes the retina to perceive the light as moving. Wertheimer worked with partners Koffka and Köhler to collect data which ultimately led to their launch of the Gestalt movement. Their findings further demonstrated that the quality of the whole is different from the sum of the parts. The explanation of the phi phenomena was that movement is perceived because the eye itself moves in response to the successive flashes of light. The movement an observer experiences is based on feedback from the moving eye. The researchers maintained that human perception is prone to such illusions and they speculated that it is more meaningful to connect close-together events than to keep them artificially separate.

== Productive thinking ==
As a Gestalt theorist, Max Wertheimer was interested in perception, but additionally interested in thought. These ideas formed the basis of his posthumously published book, Productive Thinking (1945). Wertheimer was interested in making a distinction between reproductive thinking and productive thinking. Reproductive thinking is associated with repetition, conditioning, habits or familiar intellectual territory. Productive thinking is the product of new ideas and breakthroughs. Productive thinking is insight-based reasoning. Wertheimer argued that only insightful reasoning could bring true understanding of conceptual problems and relationships. Wertheimer encouraged training in traditional logic. He believed traditional logic stimulated thinking. However, he believed that logic alone did not give rise to productive thinking. He believed creativity was also crucial to engage in productive thinking. In Productive Thinking, similar to his lectures, Wertheimer used concrete examples to illustrate his principles. Wertheimer used these illustrations to demonstrate the transition from S1, a state where nothing really seems to make sense, to S2, where everything seems clear and the concept grasped. He points out in "Productive Thinking" that solving a problem by blind obedience to rules prevents real understanding of the problems. He believes that this blind obedience forestalls a person from uncovering the solution. Max Wertheimer's ideas of productive thinking are of continuing relevance in modern ideas of schemas, plans, and knowledge structures today.

== Gestalt theory ==
Wertheimer developed his Gestalt theory in 1910 while he was on board a train from Vienna for a vacation in Germany's Rhineland. Gestalt, in the closest English definition of the term, is translated potentially as configuration, form, holistic, structure, and pattern. According to Gestalt psychology, perception is a whole. In this sense, perception can shape vision and the other senses. In addition, the theory also maintained that the whole is not only greater than its components but also different from those components, an idea first developed by Aristotle. By 1920, Wertheimer added the position that the properties of any parts are governed by the structural laws of the whole. Later efforts to discover such laws had limited success. Wertheimer's work on gestalt psychology with his colleagues at The New School was seen as an opposition and alternative to the behavioral approach to psychology.

Wertheimer started the cognitive school of psychology. His ideas also challenged structuralism and atomism, in that he and other gestalt psychologists were more concerned about the whole rather than small structures or fragments of an object.

== Four major papers from 1934 to 1940 ==
After leaving Germany, Wertheimer was preoccupied with the dilemmas of his time. He wrote four major papers on values he felt were threatened: truth, ethics, democracy and freedom, respectively. In 1934 Wertheimer published "On Truth", in which he made a distinction between Truth (T), which is understood within its full situation, and piecemeal truth (t) :"A thing may be true in the piecemeal sense, and false, indeed a lie, as a part in its whole." He believed in the importance of the "will to truth" and the need look at the "total situation" in order to live justly.

in 1935 he wrote "Some Problems in the Theory of Ethics. Wertheimer thought poor ethics were primarily a sickness of logic, a result of "piecemeal" thinking, more than it was a result of a person's inner drive toward destruction. The third paper, "On the Concept of Democracy" was published in 1937.

In 1940 the fourth of these papers was published, this one on the topic of freedom, titled "A Story of Three Days." It was published in Freedom: Its Meaning, a collected works by many famous thinkers on the topic of freedom. A synthesis of the ideas that he wrote about in the first three papers, this one was written in the style of an autobiographical parable, like the sort of narrative seen in a pilgrim's progress. It is Wertheimer's "final affirmation of faith in the power of Gestalt, of the will to truth and justice, to lead the world into a post-Hitler era of freedom".

== Publications ==
- M. Wertheimer (1912). "Experimentelle Studien über das Sehen von Bewegung" [Experimental Studies on Motion Vision] (PDF). Zeitschrift für Psychologie. 61 (1): 161–265.
- Wertheimer, M. (1922). Untersuchungen zur Lehre von der Gestalt, I: Prinzipielle Bemerkungen [Investigations in Gestalt theory: I. The general theoretical situation]. Psychologische Forschung, 1, 47–58.
- Wertheimer, M. (1923). Untersuchungen zur Lehre von der Gestalt, II. [Investigations in Gestalt Theory: II. Laws of organization in perceptual forms]. Psychologische Forschung, 4, 301–350.
- Wertheimer, M. (1934). "On Truth." Social Research. The Johns Hopkins University Press. 1 (2): 135–146
- Wertheimer, M. (1935). "Some Problems in the Theory of Ethics." Social Research. 2 (3)
- Wertheimer. M. (1937). "On the Concept of Democracy" in M. Ascoli & F. Lehmann (Ed.), Political and Economic Democracy. W. W. Norton and Company.
- Wertheimer, M. (1938a). "The general theoretical situation". In W. D. Ellis (Ed.), A source book of Gestalt psychology (pp. 12–16). London, England: Routledge & Kegan Paul. (Original work published 1922)
- Wertheimer, M. (1938b). "Gestalt theory". In W. D. Ellis (Ed.), A source book of Gestalt psychology (pp. 1–11). London, England: Routledge & Kegan Paul. (Original work published 1924)
- Wertheimer, M. (1938c). Laws of organization in perceptual forms. In W. D. Ellis (Ed.), A source book of Gestalt psychology (pp. 71–94). London, England: Routledge & Kegan Paul. (Original work published 1923)
- Wertheimer, M. (1940). "A Story of Three Days" in R.N. Anshen (Ed.), Freedom: Its Meaning. Harcourt, Brace and Company, Inc.
- Wertheimer, M. (1945). Productive Thinking. New York, NY: Harper.
- Wertheimer, M. (1959). Productive Thinking. 2nd ed., New York, NY: Harper

== See also ==
- Berlin school of experimental psychology

== Sources ==
- Michael Wertheimer, A Brief History of Psychology. 4th ed. Fort Worth TX: Harcourt Brace, 2000.
- American Psychological Association. Portraits of Pioneers in Psychology. New York: APA and Ehrlbaum, 2000.
- D. Brett King and Michael Wertheimer, Max Wertheimer and Gestalt Theory. New Brunswick NJ: Transaction Publishers, 2005.
- Sills, D. L., & Merton, R. K. (1968). Max Wertheimer. International encyclopedia of the social sciences (pp. 522–527). New York: Macmillan.
- Cherry, K. (n.d.). Max Wertheimer Biography. Psychology – Complete Guide to Psychology for Students, Educators & Enthusiasts. Retrieved February 25, 2012
- Cherry, K. (n.d.). Perceptual Organization – Gestalt Laws of Perceptual Organization. Psychology – Complete Guide to Psychology for Students, Educators & Enthusiasts. Retrieved February 25, 2012
- Hothersall, D. (2003). History of Psychology. New York: McGraw-Hill.
- Sarris, V. (1989). "Max Wertheimer on seen motion: Theory and evidence". Psychological Research. 51 (2): 58–68. doi:10.1007/BF00309358. PMID 2687920. S2CID 12567348.
- "Max Wertheimer memorial issue". Psychological Research. 51 (2): 43–85. 1989. PMID 2687919.
- Sarris, V. (1988). "Max Wertheimer in Frankfurt--on the origin and development crisis of gestalt psychology. III. Further studies of motion perception (1929–1933)". Zeitschrift für Psychologie mit Zeitschrift für Angewandte Psychologie. 196 (1): 27–61. PMID 2905852.
- Sarris, V. (1987). "Max Wertheimer in Frankfurt--on the beginnings and developmental crisis of Gestalt psychology. II. Structural rules of motion and space perception (1911–1914)". Zeitschrift für Psychologie mit Zeitschrift für Angewandte Psychologie. 195 (4): 403–431. PMID 2895554.
- Sarris, V. (1987). "Max Wertheimer in Frankfurt – on the beginnings and developmental crisis of Gestalt psychology. Initial studies of motion perception (1910–1912)". Zeitschrift für Psychologie mit Zeitschrift für Angewandte Psychologie. 195 (3): 283–310. PMID 2895552.
- Miller, A. I. (1975). "Albert Einstein and Max Wertheimer: A Gestalt psychologist's view of the genesis of special relativity theory". History of Science. 13 (2): 75–103. Bibcode:1975HisSc..13...75M. doi:10.1177/007327537501300201. PMID 11610002. S2CID 35472593.
- Wertheimer, M.; King, D. B.; Peckler, M. A.; Raney, S.; Schaef, R. W. (1992). "Carl Jung and Max Wertheimer on a priority issue". Journal of the History of the Behavioral Sciences. 28 (1): 45–56. doi:10.1002/1520-6696(199201)28:1<45::AID-JHBS2300280104>3.0.CO;2-P. PMID 11612657.
