= Kafka (surname) =

Kafka is a Czech surname, which is an old spelling of the word "kavka", which means jackdaw in Czech, or occasionally a given name from a Yiddish diminutive for Ya'akov. Notable people with the surname include:

- Alexandre Kafka (1917–2007), Czech-Brazilian economist
- Bohumil Kafka (1878–1942), Czech sculptor and pedagogue
- Bruno Kafka (1881–1931), Czech politician and academic
- Franz Kafka (1883–1924), Czech German-language writer
- Gustav Kafka (1883–1953), Austrian philosopher and psychologist
- Helene Kafka (1894–1943), Bohemian-Austrian nun, surgical nurse
- Hermann Kafka (1852–1931), Czech merchant, father of Franz
- Jakub Kafka (born 1976), Czech footballer
- Maria Restituta Kafka (1894–1943), Czech-Austrian Catholic religious sister and martyr
- Martin Kafka (born 1947), American psychiatrist
- Mike Kafka (born 1987), American football player
- Ottla Kafka (1892–1943), sister of Franz
- Vladimír Kafka (1931–1970), Czech translator

== See also ==
- Kavka, alternative spelling of the surname
