= Kavka =

Kavka is a Czech, Slovak and Ukrainian surname. Notable people with the surname include:

- Gregory S. Kavka, philosopher and author of Kavka's toxin puzzle
- Jerome Kavka (1922–2012), American psychologist
- Peter Kavka (born 1990), Slovak footballer

The surname originates from kavka, the word for the jackdaw bird species in the Czech and Slovak languages.

== See also ==
- Kavka Shishido, Japanese drummer and vocalist
- Kafka (surname)
- Kafka (disambiguation)
