= Vladimír Kafka =

Vladimír Kafka (23 February 1931 – 19 October 1970) was a Czech literature professor and a noted translator from German to Czech.

== Life ==
He was born in Prague into the family of Vladimír Kafka, a civil servant. After graduating from gymnasium, he studied Czech and German at the Faculty of Arts of Charles University in Prague from 1950 to 1956, where he graduated with his diploma thesis F. X. Šalda and German literature.

From 1956 until his death, he worked at the Mladá fronta publishing house, first as a proofreader and from 1957 as editor in charge of German and French literature. He wrote a number of studies of German literature, especially on German literary expressionism (Gottfried Benn and Georg Trakl), and authored many prefaces and afterwords to editions of works by German writers. His translation work has focused on Franz Kafka and contemporary German literature (Heinrich Böll and Günter Grass). He also contributed to the journal Světová literatura, the Journal for Modern Philology and the monthly magazine Nový život. In 1968-1969 he was a member of the editorial board of the magazine Tvář.

Among his translations are translations of Kafka's work (such as The Castle) and the translation of Günter Grass's The Tin Drum.

His son Štěpán Kafka (*1962) is a novelist and a poet. His second son Tomáš Kafka (*1965) was Czech Republic's Ambassador to Ireland, and to Germany, and is a poet and translator.

== Works ==
- Thomas Mann: Posthumous bibliography of the writer's works, Výzkumumný osvětový ústav, Prague 1956
- Heinrich Heine: Selected Bibliography, Ústřední vědecko-metodický kabinet knihovnictví Národní knihovny, Prague 1957.
- Thomas Mann: Life and Work, Státní knihovna ČSR, Prague 1959.
- Studies and Reflections on German Literature, Kra, Prague 1995, edited by Petr Turek

== Translations ==
- Erich Auerbach - Mimesis (1968), translated with Miloslav Žilina and Rio Preisner
- Heinrich Böll - Billiards at Half-Past Nine (1962)
- Heinrich Böll - The Clown (1966)
- Max Brod - Franz Kafka: A Biography (1966), translated with Josef Čermák
- Franz Kafka - The Castle (1964)
- Franz Kafka - Short Stories (1964)
- Franz Kafka - Description of a Struggle (1968)
- Franz Kafka - Short Stories I. - Metamorphosis and other texts published during his lifetime (1999)
- Günter Grass - The Tin Drum (1969)
- Richard Matthias Müller - Socratic Dialogues (1968)
- Klaus Wagenbach - Franz Kafka (1967), translated with Josef Čermák
