= Max Rothmann =

German neuroanatomist and physiologist (1868–1915)

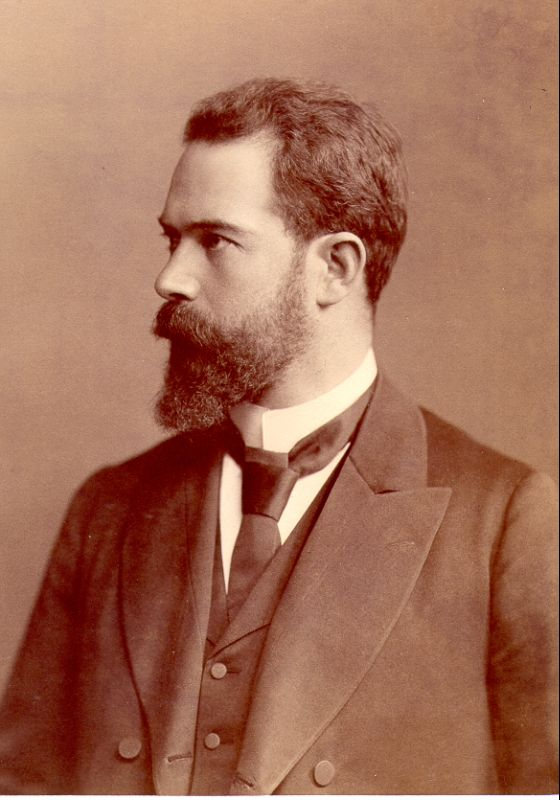
- Born: April 26, 1868; Berlin, Germany
- Died: August 12, 1915 (aged 47); Berlin, Germany

Max Rothmann (April 26, 1868 – August 12, 1915) was a German neuroanatomist and physiologist who was a native of Berlin.

== Biography ==
He was born on April 26, 1868, in Berlin, into a Jewish family. His father Oskar Rothmann (1834-1915) was the physician and "Sanitätsrat".

He studied medicine in Berlin and Freiburg. In 1889 he earned his medical doctorate at Berlin. In 1891 he worked in Carl Weigert's laboratory, then he was an assistant to Albert Fraenkel in Krankenhaus am Urban.

Rothmann was the catalyst concerning the establishment of an anthropological research station in the Canary Islands, which was subsequently founded at Orotava, Tenerife in 1913 with Eugen Teuber (1889-1958) as its first director. Wolfgang Köhler was an important scientific colleague at the Tenerife-Institute. In 1914, Rothmann became director of Neurologisches Centralblatt.

In August, 1915, at the age of 47, Rothmann committed suicide. He was buried in Jüdischer Friedhof Schönhauser Allee, Berlin-Pankow. Obituaries were written by Louis Jacobsohn-Lask (1863-1940), Hermann Oppenheim, Hugo Liepmann and Smith Ely Jelliffe.

== Family ==
Max Rothmann was married to Anna Neumann (1871–1936); they had at least four children. Elder son Otto (1896–1914) was killed in World War I. Hans (1899–1970) studied medicine and continued some of neuroanatomical works of his father; he emigrated to USA. Daughter Eva Rothmann (1897–1960) was psychologist and married Kurt Goldstein. The second daughter was Grete Rothmann-Arons.

== Legacy ==
His name is lent to "Rothmann-Makai panniculitis", which is a disease named along with Hungarian surgeon Endre Makai (1884-1972). This disorder is sometimes referred to as lipogranulomatosis subcutanea, and is a rare variant of Weber–Christian disease.
