= Kubka =

Kubka is a Slavic surname. Notable people with the surname include:

- Branislav Kubka (born 1988), Slovak professional ice hockey player
- František Kubka (1894–1969), Czech writer, journalist, diplomat and politician
- Jacek Kubka (born 1967), Polish sports shooter
- Martyna Kubka (born 2001), Polish tennis player
