= Friedrich Koffka =

Friedrich Koffka (22 April 1888 – 5 November 1951) was a German lawyer and writer.

== Early life and education ==
Friedrich Koffka was born in Berlin. His mother, Luis Levy, listed herself as Protestant despite having a Jewish heritage. His father, Emil Koffka, was a lawyer, and his older brother was the psychologist Kurt Koffka.

Friedrich Koffka studied law at the University of Berlin, and took his first state examination in 1910. During the First World War Koffka was first a volunteer nurse, then a soldier. After the end of the war, Koffka entered the service of the Prussian Ministry of Justice in September 1919. From 1921 he was a district court counsellor in Charlottenburg, from 1927 an assistant judge and from 1930 a judge at the Kammergerichtsrat, the Berlin State Court of Appeal.

As a young man Koffka was interested in theatre. As a 19-year-old he reviewed a 1907 production of Hamlet in the theatrical magazine Schaubühne. Koffka became a member of Kurt Hiller's literary expressionist New club. Koffka's first play was David and Absalom in 1913 and he continued to write journalism for Blätter des Deutschen Theaters, Das Tage-Buch, and Schaubühne for some years. His expressionist dram Kain premiered on 9 June 1918 on the experimental stage of the Deutsches Theater in Berlin.

From 1925 to 1930, Koffka was in a relationship with the poet Paula Ludwig. Ludwig dedicated her 1927 poetry collection Himmlische Spiegel to him. Although the couple had agreed to marry, they did not because of reservations either by Koffka or his family. He later married and divorced a different woman.

As a Jew, Koffka was forced by Kerrl's Decree to stop working as a judge at the beginning of April 1933. After a few months he was able to return to the judicial service under the June 1933 Law for the Restoration of the Professional Civil Service because he had been a front-line fighter in the First World War. However in March 1937 he was finally forced out and emigrated to England in 1938.

Koffka was interned by the British from June to September 1940. By 1942 he was employed by the British Fund for Jewish Relief and Rehabilitation. He was one of the leaders of Hans José Rehfisch's Club 1943 which was an attempt by emigre members of the German Communist Party to organise German cultural writers in Britain. Koffka wrote radio plays for the BBC and articles under the pseudonym Florin ("Letters to Elinor Gardens") for the British Ministry of Information's Die Zeitung from 1943 to 1945. After the war, he continued to work for the BBC as an announcer and editor. Koffka chose to stay in Britain after the war, having turned his back on Germany: "But where is Germany now? ... The country that was once our home has lost its reality for us."

== Works ==
- Sincerus (pseudonym): Kaiser Wilhelm II: Zum zwanzigjährigen Regierungsjubiläum. Charlottenburg, 1908
- David and Absalom. Fragment of a play 1913
- Kain [Cain]. Drama 1917
- Herr Oluf. Drama 1919
- Letters to Elinor Gardens. Radio play 1943
- Goethe in England. Radio play 1949
- Uncle Toby. Radio play 1950
- Wellington. Radio play 1951

== Further references ==
- Koffka, Friedrich, in: Werner Röder; Herbert A. Strauss (Hrsg.): International Biographical Dictionary of Central European Emigrés 1933–1945. Band 2,1. München : Saur, 1983 ISBN 3-598-10089-2, S. 641
- Koffka, Fritz, in: Hans Bergemann, Simone Ladwig-Winters: Richter und Staatsanwälte jüdischer Herkunft in Preußen im Nationalsozialismus : eine rechtstatsächliche Untersuchung. Eine Dokumentation. Cologne : Bundesanzeiger-Verlag, 2004, p. 226
- Literature by and about Friedrich Koffka in the German National Library catalogue
