= Kafka (disambiguation) =

Franz Kafka (1883–1924) was a German-language writer from Prague.

Kafka may also refer to:

- Kafka (surname)
- Kafka (film), a 1991 film by Steven Soderbergh
- Franz Kafka Prize, also referred as Kafka Prize
- Franz Kafka Society, a non-profit organisation established in 1990 to celebrate the heritage of German Language literature in Prague
- 3412 Kafka, an asteroid
- Apache Kafka, a software platform for storing events and processing data streams
- Anti-fascist research group Kafka, a Dutch anti-fascist and far-left research group
- Kafka, a character in Amphetamine
- Kafka, a character in the Honkai series, more predominantly in Honkai: Star Rail
- Kafka Tamura, main character in Kafka on the Shore by Haruki Murakami
- Kafka Hibino, main character in the manga Kaiju No. 8 by Naoya Matsumoto
- Kafka: Toward a Minor Literature, a 1975 book by Gilles Deleuze and Felix Guattari
- "Kafka", a song by Jinjer from Duél (Jinjer album)

== See also ==
- Margit Kaffka (1880–1918), Hungarian writer
- Kavka, a surname
