= Kurt Koffka =

German psychologist and professor (1886–1941)

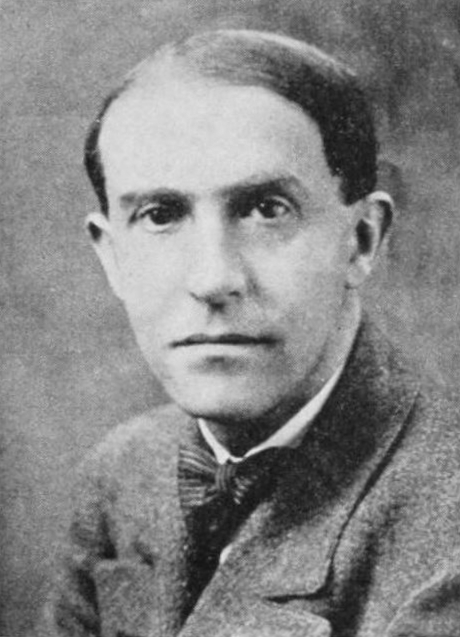
- Born: March 17, 1886; Berlin, German Empire
- Died: November 22, 1941 (aged 55); Northampton, Massachusetts, U.S.

Education
- Education: University of Edinburgh; University of Berlin
- Doctoral advisor: Carl Stumpf

Philosophical work
- Era: 20th-century philosophy
- Region: Western philosophy
- School: Gestalt psychology Berlin school of experimental psychology
- Institutions: University of Freiburg; University of Würzburg; Goethe University Frankfurt; University of Giessen; Cornell University; University of Wisconsin–Madison; Smith College
- Main interests: Social psychology Gestalt psychology

Kurt Koffka (German: [ˈkɔfka]; March 12, 1886 – November 22, 1941) was a German psychologist and professor. He was born and educated in Berlin, Germany; he died in Northampton, Massachusetts, from coronary thrombosis. He was influenced by his maternal uncle, a biologist, to pursue science. He had many interests including visual perception, brain damage, sound localization, developmental psychology, and experimental psychology. He worked alongside Max Wertheimer and Wolfgang Köhler to develop Gestalt psychology. Koffka had several publications including "The Growth of the Mind: An Introduction to Child Psychology" (1924) and "The Principles of Gestalt Psychology" (1935) which elaborated on his research.

== Personal life ==
Kurt Koffka, born March 18, 1886, in Berlin, Germany, was raised by Luis Levy and Emil Koffka. His mother listed herself as Protestant despite having Jewish heritage. His father was a lawyer, and his younger brother, Friedrich Koffka, went on to become a judge. In spite of the prevalence of law in his family, Kurt Koffka decided to pursue science as he was motivated by his maternal uncle, who was a biologist.

Koffka married Mira Klein, a participant in his experimental research, in 1909, but they later divorced. In 1923, he married Elisabeth Ahlgrimm who completed her PhD at Giessen, but they divorced in 1926. He remarried Mira until their second divorce in 1928 when he remarried Elisabeth to whom he remained married until his death. Koffka was forced to alter his lifestyle after developing a heart condition called Coronary thrombosis. However, his condition did not hamper his work ethic as his lecturing and scientific projects occupied his time until he died. Koffka died on November 22, 1941, in Northampton, Massachusetts, and left many of his projects unfinished.

== Education ==
Kurt Koffka's academic career began at the school of Wilhelmsgymnasium where he attended from 1892 to 1903. In 1903, Kurt Koffka traveled to Scotland to study at the University of Edinburgh for a year. His time at the University of Edinburgh was crucial as he developed a greater understanding of the English language which was a valuable tool for articulating the principles of gestalt psychology in English. In 1904, he returned to Berlin where he attended the University of Berlin for three years. He chose to pursue psychology as he believed the subject matter of psychology was best suited towards his interests.

While studying at the University of Berlin, Koffka examined his personal colour vision in Willibald Nagel's physiological laboratory. He was interested in visual perception due to his own red-green blindness, which led him to study color vision and after-images. This work culminated in Koffka's first publication in 1908 called "Untersuchungen an einem protanomalen System" [Studies on a protanomalous system]. This paper analyzed different properties of colour including contrast as well as the effect of brightness and wavelengths on colour. The figure ground phenomenon was also studied. Koffka completed his dissertation called Experimental-Untersuchungen zur Lehre von Rhythmus [Experimental studies on the teaching of rhythm] securing him his Doctor of Philosophy in 1908. He worked with Carl Stumpf during the pursuit of his doctorate.

== Career ==
After receiving his doctorate in 1908, Koffka worked at the University of Würzburg as an assistant to Oswald Külpe who greatly influenced his work. After Külpe left, Koffka continued to work as an assistant to Karl Marbe. In 1910, Koffka became an assistant to Friedrich Schumann at the Psychological Institute in Frankfurt on Main to study the perception of motion, alongside Max Wertheimer and Wolfgang Köhler. Koffka considered this period in his life significant to his scientific development.

Koffka later became a professor at the University of Giessen. The University of Giessen assigned Koffka the Privatdozent title in 1911 and the ausserordentlicher while working with August Messer. Eighteen articles and six experimental works were completed over the twelve years that Koffka spent at Giessen. Koffka spent time at Professor Sommer's Psychiatric Clinic located in Giessen in the midst of World War I. They focused on subjects diagnosed with brain trauma, but focused on aphasia cases. He also studied the localization of sounds to be of aid to the army and navy.

In 1924, Koffka moved to the United States of America and retained a research professor position at Smith College in Northampton, Massachusetts, beginning in 1927. His priority during this time was work regarding visual perception.

In 1932, Uzbekistan was undergoing significant changes as a constituent republic of the Soviet Union, and in just over a decade saw a transition from a feudal aristocracy to a modern developing nation. It was at this time that Koffka traveled there to join others in researching the impact of the rapid pace of social, cultural, and economic development on affected individuals' cognition; the new generation was the first in Uzbek history to be fully literate and receive a formal education. His work did not result in any publications. However, while in Uzbekistan, an illness, diagnosed as relapsing fever, rendered Koffka very ill but, in spite of his condition, he began to work on his book, "The Principles of Gestalt Psychology", which was published in 1935. Once this book was completed, Koffka's previous self-limitations were eased as he allowed himself to delve into areas he previously felt were inappropriate for his specialty. This broadened scope was evidenced by his incorporation of psychology in other fields of interest including the arts and ethics. He spent the year 1939-1940 visiting Sir Hugh Cairns at the Nuffield Institute in Oxford.

== Contributions to psychology ==
=== Learning ===
The Gestalt principle of proximity

The Gestalt principle of similarity

Koffka believed that most of early learning is what he referred to as, "sensorimotor learning," which is a type of learning which occurs after a consequence. For example, a child who touches a hot stove will learn not to touch it again. Koffka also believed that a lot of learning occurs by imitation, though he argued that it is not necessary to understand how imitation works, but rather to acknowledge that it is a natural occurrence. According to Koffka, the highest type of learning is ideational learning, which makes use of language. Koffka notes that a crucial time in children's development is when they understand that objects have names.

=== Gestalt psychology ===
Koffka gained his initial interest in Gestalt psychology after participating in Wertheimer's phi phenomenon study. In 1910, Kurt Koffka worked alongside Max Wertheimer and Wolfgang Köhler at the Psychological Institute in Frankfurt. They focused their research on sensory information and memory, and later became the founding fathers of Gestalt psychology. Max Wertheimer is often credited with developing the idea of Gestalt psychology, but they were influenced by Christian von Ehrenfels's idea that a holistic melody is more than a simple combination of various sounds. This later becomes essential to theories of Gestalt psychology which convey that complete perception is more meaningful than its individual parts put together.

The Gestalt Principles were developed to delve into how the human eye perceives visual elements. The principles help to provide ways to understand how complex visual elements can be broken down into simpler parts. The principles also try to demonstrate how the human eye perceives shapes as a single "object" instead of splitting the object into simplified components of the object being seen. Some of the most commonly used principles were proximity, similarity, and continuation. Gestalt principle of proximity discussed that visual elements close to one another will be perceived as a whole. Gestalt principle of similarity establishes that people tend to categorize objects that share the same traits into a group. Gestalt principle of continuity reveals how people perceive lines or curves as a whole if they "touch" one another.

Koffka needed to provide empirical evidence for the new theory. To accomplish this, Koffka formulated a three-stage proposition that revolutionized existing assumptions of psychology:

1. Perceiving sensory experiences as a combination of individual parts does not align with the actual experience of perception. The school of Gestalt suggests that human sensory experience be viewed as a whole since wholes are more meaningful than the sum of their parts.
2. It is a mistake to correlate a stimulus with sensation because functionality of a stimulus must be paired with factual information. Stimuli should be correlated to factual content of the perceptive field.
3. The previous two premises hold that the relationship between the psyche and physical needs to be reconsidered.

In 1922, Kurt Koffka published an article called "Perception: An Introduction to the Gestalt-Theorie" in the Psychological Bulletin to introduce Gestalt psychology to the American academics. The article focused on describing how Gestalt psychology studies various perceptual phenomena using different theories from existing ones. After its publication, it led to the criticisms of Gestalt psychology that it was overly focused on perception, and lacked contribution to overall themes of psychology.

=== Aesthetic Gestalt (1940) ===
In 1940, Kurf Koffka traveled to Philadelphia and attended a conference at Bryn Mawr which brought together many different well-known figures from different fields of study to approach art from different perspectives. At the time, many subjects such as culture, ecology, evolution, emotion, psychology, knowledge, physiology had been treated as their own independent fields with no connection to one another. Kurt Koffka attempted to make a multidisciplinary theory of art known as the Aesthetic of Gestalt. Koffka's presentation at the conference advanced the scientific theory of art, but it is a neglected theory that has mostly been forgotten after its publication.

The main focus in Aesthetic theory is the appreciation of beauty in art pieces. There are 3 components in the relationship: the self (the spectator), the extraordinary art piece, and the connection between the two. Aesthetic of Gestalt illustrates that the self (the individual) sees that there is an important message when observing the art piece. Koffka identifies three problems with the aesthetic experience. The first is contingency. While behaviourists believe that art naturally evokes an emotional response, Koffka argued that the previous associations must exist to understand that redness for example means passion. This previous association is a rational and intelligible interaction that draws on a look-up table, not blindly resorting to the look-up table. The second problem is with the empathy-based art theories about aesthetic and how the fact that people put their own emotions onto the art piece is paradoxical. In order for an art piece to be appreciated, the self must first recognize the emotion they must attribute to the piece. The third problem is that empathy logic implies that emotions projected by the self onto the art piece are to be felt by others. However, just because the person perceives that red is passionate does not mean they are feeling the same passion themselves.

== Honours ==
In 2006, members of the Department of Psychology of Justus Liebig University Giessen founded the Kurt-Koffka medal to honour scientists who have made extraordinary advances to the fields of perception or developmental psychology.

== Publications ==
=== "Perception: An Introduction to the Gestalt-theorie" (1922) ===
In 1922, Kurt Koffka published an article called "Perception: An Introduction to the Gestalt-Theorie" in the Psychological Bulletin to introduce Gestalt psychology to the American academics. The article focused on how Gestalt psychology describes three main points which are sensation, association and attention with a different scope than other existing theories. Sensation puts forward the idea of the "bundle-hypothesis" which means that the world is made up of elements that come together to create stimuli in our world. The second listed concept of association is acknowledged by Koffka as the primary factor that decides what is coming and going in regards to our ideas. It is association that puts one idea forward over another idea in our train of thought and ties all those separate elemental ideas together. The final point of attention is described as a "scapegoat" by Koffka. If one's attention fails to notice a stimulus, then the correlated response to that stimulus will not happen, even though the stimulus is present. After its publication, Koffka's article led to the criticisms that gestalt psychology was overly focused on perception, and lacked contribution to overall themes of psychology.

=== The Growth of the Mind: An Introduction to Child Psychology (1924) ===
One of Koffka's most notable contributions to psychology was his book entitled, "The Growth of the Mind: An Introduction to Child Psychology". The English translation of this book was done by Robert M. Ogden. Koffka had two main goals in writing this book. His first goal was to utilize Gestalt principles to present an innovative view of childhood phenomena. His second goal was to provide educators with an up-to-date resource in order to facilitate effective teaching. In this book, Koffka focused on mind development in children and outlined four ways in which development occurs. Firstly, he stated physical movements must become more advanced and precise as children grow older. As infants, we begin with rudimentary motor skills and with development we can engage in more complex physical activities. Secondly, he believed infants must develop their sensory integration skills and learn to become effective perceivers of their environment. Thirdly, Koffka stated that children must utilize their motor and sensory systems as they are dependent on each other to create a coherent whole which is utilized to facilitate appropriate behaviour. Lastly, Koffka thought children must learn to rely on their cognition when acting as opposed to their impulses.

=== The Principles of Gestalt Psychology (1935) ===
This book addressed applied psychology but mainly focused on the research concerning perception, memory, and learning. Koffka published this book in 1935 and it changed the basic ideas within research involving perception. Veridical perception states that objects people see in the environment will have relatively consistent characteristics such as size, and color. Before this book was published, researchers had assumed that there was no need to explain the features of veridical perception. Koffka rejected the idea that researchers should only focus on illusions within people's perception, because he thought it was always necessary to understand why people perceive objects the way that they do. This book approaches the topic of veridical perception in a phenomenological and holistic manner that supported the Gestalt Principles as well as other research that supported the Gestalt orientation. This work also explored the notion of behavioural environments. A person's behaviour can result from one's own behavioural environment or another person's behavioural environment. This means that someone can see and understand their actions one way and another person could see the same actions and understand them completely differently. Psychologists need to be mindful to view an individual's behaviour from the other individual's behavioural environment rather than their own.

== See also ==
- Koffka ring, a geometric optical illusion discovered by Kurt Koffka
