= Carl Stumpf =

German philosopher (1848–1936)

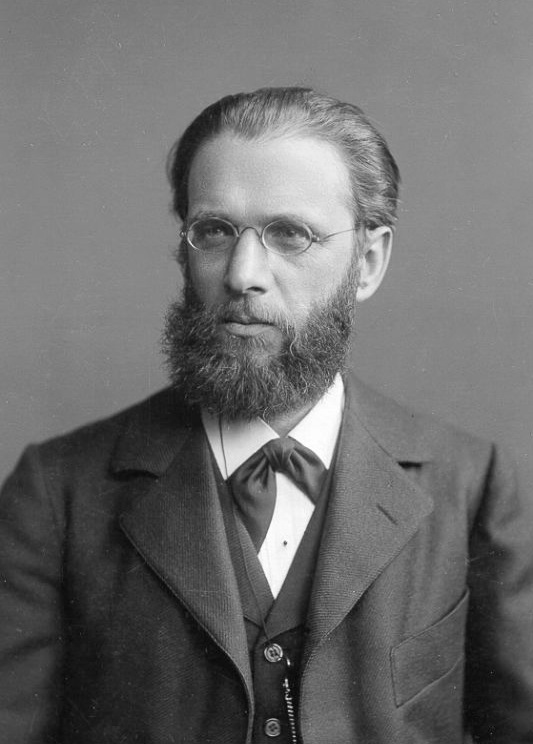
- Born: 21 April 1848; Wiesentheid, Kingdom of Bavaria
- Died: 25 December 1936 (aged 88); Berlin, Germany

Education
- Education: University of Göttingen (Dr. phil., 1868; Dr. phil. hab., 1870)
- Theses: Verhältniß des Platonischen Gottes zur Idee des Guten (The Relation of the Platonic God to the Idea of the Good (1868); Über die Grundsätze der Mathematik (On the Principles of Mathematics) (1870)
- Doctoral advisor: Hermann Lotze (doctoral and habilitation advisor)
- Other advisor: Franz Brentano

Philosophical work
- Era: 20th-century philosophy
- Region: Western philosophy
- School: School of Brentano (early); Berlin school of experimental psychology Phenomenology
- Doctoral students: Bernard Groethuysen; Edmund Husserl; Kurt Koffka; Wolfgang Köhler; Herbert Langfeld; Kurt Lewin; Robert Musil; Eduard Spranger
- Notable students: Aron Gurwitsch; Max Scheler
- Main interests: Philosophy of mind, psychology
- Notable ideas: Tone psychology

Carl Stumpf (German: [ʃtʊmpf]; 21 April 1848 – 25 December 1936) was a German philosopher, psychologist and musicologist. He is noted for founding the Berlin school of experimental psychology.

He studied with Franz Brentano at the University of Würzburg before receiving his doctorate at the University of Göttingen in 1868. He also tutored the modernist literature writer Robert Musil at the University of Berlin, and worked with Hermann Lotze, who is famous for his work in perception, at Göttingen. Stumpf is known for his work on the psychology of tones. He had an important influence on his students Wolfgang Köhler and Kurt Koffka who were instrumental in the founding of Gestalt psychology as well as Kurt Lewin, who was also a part of the Gestalt group and was key in the establishment of experimental social psychology in America.

Stumpf is considered one of the pioneers of comparative musicology and ethnomusicology, as documented in his study of the origins of human musical cognition The Origins of Music (1911). He held positions in the philosophy departments at the Universities of Göttingen, Würzburg, Prague, Munich and Halle, before obtaining a professorship at the University of Berlin.

== Early life ==
Carl Stumpf was born in Wiesentheid, Franconia, in the Kingdom of Bavaria, to a prominent family. His father was the country court physician, and his immediate family included scientists and academicians, like his grandfather, who studied eighteenth-century French literature and the philosophers Kant and Schelling. Stumpf showed precocious musical talent as a child, learning the violin by the age of 7. By age 10, he had learned five other instruments and wrote his first musical composition.

== Education ==
Stumpf was sickly as a child, so his early education was conducted at home with his grandfather as his tutor. Stumpf attended the local Gymnasium, where he developed a passion for philosophy, especially the works of Plato, before enrolling at the University of Würzburg at the age of 17. He spent one semester studying aesthetics and one studying law. Then, in his third semester, he met Franz Brentano, who taught Stumpf to think logically and empirically. Brentano's lectures were also attended by Anton Marty, Carl van Endert, Ernst Commer, Ludwig Schütz, and Hermann Schell. Brentano also encouraged Stumpf to take courses on the natural sciences because he considered both the substance and methods of science important to philosophy. After two semesters of studying with Brentano and with encouragement from his mentor, he transferred to the University of Göttingen to study under Hermann Lotze, a German perceptual theorist. There he was awarded a doctorate in 1868.

In 1869, he entered a seminary, intending to be a Catholic priest. However, he disagreed with the dogma of the papal infallibility, so he returned to the University of Göttingen for his doctorate. He was awarded venia legendi for philosophy in 1870 after completing his thesis on mathematical axioms, which he wrote in Latin.

== Academic career ==
Soon after, Stumpf was granted a position as an instructor at the University of Göttingen in the Department of Philosophy. There Stumpf met Ernst Weber and Gustav Fechner, and served as an observer in their psychological experiments. Their careful approach to a problem of aesthetics, specifically the visual appeal of rectangles of different proportions, appealed to Stumpf and reinforced the notion learned from Brentano that psychological acts or functions can be studied empirically.

In 1873, Stumpf returned to the University of Würzburg as a professor in the Department of Philosophy. Although he was forced to teach all of the philosophy and psychology courses due to Brentano's forced departure from the university, Stumpf completed his first major psychological work, an examination of visual perception, particularly depth perception. He proposed a nativist explanation for depth perception, and his book has been cited as an outstanding early contribution to the debate between the nativist and empiricist views of perception. He disputed the Kantian notion of space as an "a priori form of intuition" in his book, On the Psychological Origin of the Presentation of Space (1873). He argued that the status of space is Teilvorstellung or a "partial presentation", one that must be experienced as part of a broader presentation.

In 1894, Stumpf was appointed to the chair of philosophy at the University of Berlin. At Berlin, he also held an adjunct appointment as director of the Institute of Experimental Psychology at Berlin. The Institute originally occupied three dark rooms, but by 1920, it had moved to twenty-five rooms in the former Imperial Palace. In 1896, Stumpf presided over the Third International Congress of Psychology, and delivered the inaugural address on the relation between mind and body; he advocated a mind–body interactionist position that opposed the popular notion of psychophysical parallelism. Finally, from 1907 to 1908, Stumpf served as the rector of the University of Berlin.

=== Phenomenology ===
Stumpf began his work on the sensation and perception of tones, called Tonpsychologie (Tone Psychology), in 1875. Originally meant to be a four-volume set, the first two volumes were published in 1883 and 1890, but the majority of the third volume was published as Konsonanz und Dissonanz. Considered his greatest contribution to psychology, the study employs a combination of theoretical analysis and empirical observations. He discusses intervals and series of tones, along with single tones. He distinguished between phenomena and mental functions, suggesting that phenomena such as tones, colors, and images are either sensory or imaginary. Stumpf termed the study of such phenomena as phenomenology. He did a wide range of studies of the phenomenological characteristics of the sounds of different instruments, the determinants of melody, tonal fusion (Verschmelzung), and the consonance and dissonance of tones. This research was made possible by the excellent collection of acoustic devices at the Institute of Physics. Stumpf's work on phenomenology influenced Edmund Husserl, who is considered the father of the school of phenomenology.

=== Sensational phenomena ===
In 1903 and 1904, Stumpf was involved in two well-publicized debunking episodes related to sensational phenomena. First, an engineer from Prague claimed to have invented a machine that could change photographs of sound waves into sound. Stumpf, after attending a demonstration, wrote an article challenging its legitimacy, causing it to never be heard about again. However, the case of Clever Hans, an apparently brilliant horse owned by Wilhelm von Osten, was even more sensational.

== Later years ==
The majority of Stumpf's later work did not include sensational or interesting research, like that of Clever Hans. With the outbreak of World War I, many students left the Institute of Experimental Psychology to fight in the war. Furthermore, the war between Germany and the allied nations disrupted many professional relationships he had with other psychologists. Stumpf retired from the University of Berlin in 1921 and was succeeded as director of the psychological institute by his former student, Wolfgang Köhler.

== Works in translation ==
- Stumpf, C.: The Origins of Music, ed. and trans. David Trippett. Oxford University Press, 2012.
- Stumpf, C.: Tone Psychology: Volume I, ed. and trans. Robin D. Rollinger. Routledge, 2019.
- "Psychology and Epistemology". In: Leech, Jessica; Textor, Mark (1 November 2020). "Carl Stumpf, "Psychologie und Erkenntnistheorie"". British Journal for the History of Philosophy. 28 (6): 1181–1216. doi:10.1080/09608788.2019.1709413.
  - Original German publication: “Psychologie und Erkenntnistheorie”, in Abhandlungen der philosophisch-philologischen Classe der königlich bayerischen Akademie der Wissenschaften (Volume 19, Part 2, pp.465-516), München 1892.
