= Wolfgang Köhler =

German-American psychologist and phenomenologist

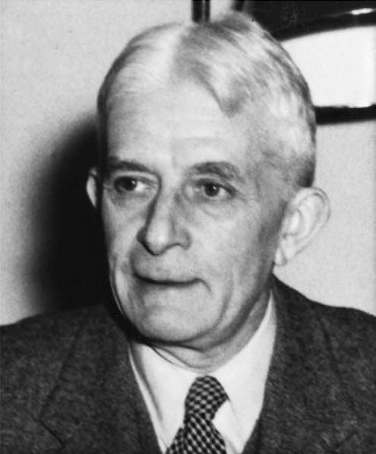
- Born: 21 January 1887; Reval (now Tallinn), Governorate of Estonia, Russian Empire
- Died: 11 June 1967 (aged 80); Enfield, New Hampshire, U.S.

Education
- Education: University of Bonn
- Thesis: Akustische Untersuchungen (Acoustic investigations) (1909)
- Doctoral advisor: Carl Stumpf
- Other advisor: Max Planck

Philosophical work
- School: Gestalt psychology Berlin school of experimental psychology Phenomenological psychology
- Institutions: University of Berlin; Swarthmore College; Dartmouth College
- Doctoral students: Carl Gustav Hempel, Karl Popper
- Main interests: Psychology
- Notable ideas: Psychology of problem solving

Signature
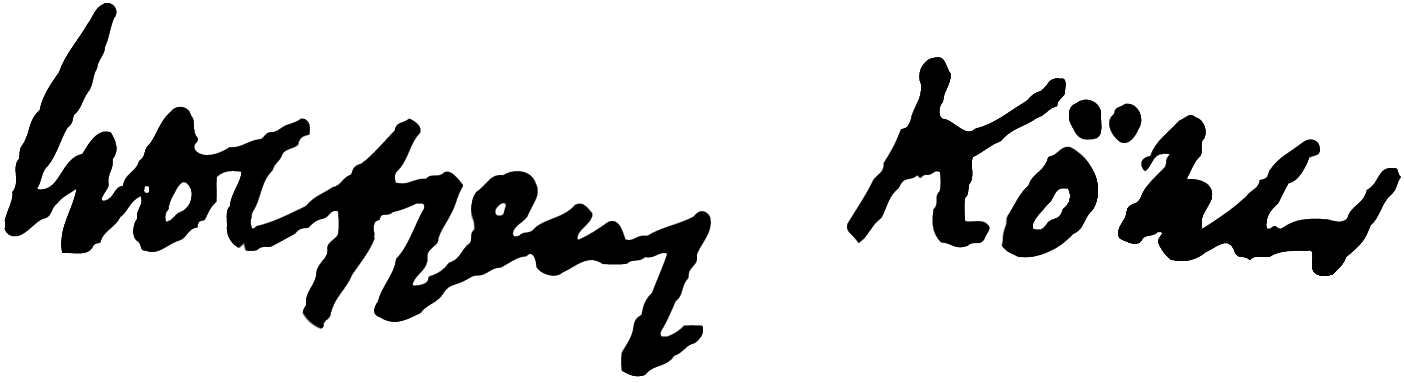

Wolfgang Köhler (German: [ˈkøːlɐ]; 21 January 1887 – 11 June 1967) was a German psychologist and phenomenologist who, like Max Wertheimer and Kurt Koffka, contributed to the creation of Gestalt psychology.

During the Nazi regime in Germany, he protested against the dismissal of Jewish professors from universities, as well as the requirement that professors give a Nazi salute at the beginning of their classes. In 1935 he left the country for the United States, where Swarthmore College in Pennsylvania offered him a professorship. He taught with its faculty for 20 years and continued research. A Review of General Psychology survey, published in 2002, ranked Köhler as the 50th most cited psychologist of the 20th century.

== Early life ==
Köhler was born in the port city of Reval (now Tallinn), Governorate of Estonia, Russian Empire. His family was ethnic German, and shortly after his birth, they moved to Germany.

== Education ==
In the course of his university education, Köhler studied at the University of Tübingen (1905–06), the University of Bonn (1906–07) and the University of Berlin (1907–09). While a student at the latter, he focused on the link between physics and psychology, in the course of which he studied with two leading scholars in those fields, Max Planck and Carl Stumpf, respectively. He completed his Ph.D. thesis (titled Akustische Untersuchungen [Acoustic investigations]) in 1909. His dissertation addressed certain aspects of psychoacoustics; Köhler had Stumpf as his advisor.

== Gestalt psychology ==
In 1910–13, he was an assistant at the Psychological Institute in Frankfurt, where he worked with fellow psychologists Max Wertheimer and Kurt Koffka. He and Koffka functioned as subjects for Wertheimer's now-famous studies of apparent movement (or the phi phenomenon), which led them in turn to conclusions about the inherent nature of vision. They collaborated on the founding of a new holistic attitude toward psychology called Gestalt theory (from the German word for "shape" or "form"), aspects of which are indebted to the earlier work of Stumpf (Köhler's teacher) and Christian von Ehrenfels (whose lectures at the University of Prague Wertheimer had attended).

In an introduction to the book, The Task of Gestalt Psychology, Carroll Pratt emphasizes Köhler's irritation at misinterpretation of his famous quote, "The whole is different from the sum of its parts". Though perhaps a simple error made in translation, many lectures in textbooks of modern-day psychology refer to Gestalt theory by saying "the whole is greater than the sum of its parts". When the word 'different' is used, as Köhler originally stated, it implies that the whole bears no resemblance to the parts creating it. Most psychologists, however, understand "greater" to mean that the relationship between the parts is itself a significant part of the whole, something that is not present in the other parts if simply summed up. Example: if all the parts of a car are laid out on the floor of a garage, they do not make up a car. Only when the factor of assembly is added to the parts, do they become a car.

== Problem solving ==
In 1913, Köhler left Frankfurt for the island of Tenerife in the Canary Islands, where he had been named the director of the Prussian Academy of Sciences anthropoid research station. He worked there for six years, during which he wrote a book on problem solving titled The Mentality of Apes (1917). In this research, Köhler observed how chimpanzees solve problems, such as that of retrieving bananas when positioned out of reach. He found that they stacked wooden crates to use as makeshift ladders, in order to retrieve the food. If the bananas were placed on the ground outside of the cage, they used sticks to lengthen the reach of their arms. Köhler concluded that the chimps had not arrived at these methods through trial-and-error (which American psychologist Edward Thorndike had claimed to be the basis of all animal learning, through his law of effect), but rather that they had an insight, in which, having realized the answer, they proceeded to carry it out in a way that was, in Köhler's words, "unwaveringly purposeful."

This is one of the prominent findings from the research done on apes. Köhler's work on the mentality of apes was seen as a turning point in the psychology of thinking. He believed that people underestimated the influence of a number of external conditions on such higher animals. In his book, The Mentality of Apes, Köhler explains that he was inspired to work with the chimpanzees for two main reasons. The first was because the "structure of their brains is more closely related to the chemistry of the human body and brain-structure than to the chemical nature of the lower apes and their brain development". He was intrigued that human traits could be observed in the everyday behaviours of this animal. Secondly, he wanted to study the chimps to gain knowledge of the nature of intelligent acts.

In the early stages of observing chimps, it was clear that the examinations should not be considered characteristic for each member of this species. Köhler recognized that, as in humans, chimpanzees demonstrated considerable differences in the intellectual field. Chimps demonstrated that they were able to grasp the objects around them in a variety of fashions. This is incorporated in their everyday playing behaviours. For this reason, it was not necessary to use experimental tests to introduce chimps to handle matter. In his book, The Mentality of Apes, Köhler describes how the apes use their hands, saying "large, powerful and flexible hands are natural links between himself and the world of things, and he attains the necessary amount of muscular force and co-ordination at an earlier age than the human child".

Köhler made most of his observations during the first six months of 1914, while working with Mr. Teuber. They provided the animals with problems that would be difficult but not impossible for the chimps to solve.

The conclusions drawn from the experiments with apes were that these animals exhibit insight and that they demonstrate intelligent behaviour that is common in humans. Köhler states that these findings hold true for every member of the species. He describes that "the correlation between intelligence and the development of the brain is confirmed". Köhler points out that a downfall of educational psychology at the time of the experiments with apes was that it had yet to create a test that was capable of assessing how far mentally healthy and mentally-ill children could go in particular situations. Köhler believed that studies of this type could be performed on young children, and that future research should focus on these possibilities. He stated that: "where the lack of human standards makes itself so much felt, I should like to emphasize particularly the importance and- if the anthropoids do not deceive us- the fruitfulness of further work in this direction".

== Criticism of introspection ==
In his book titled Gestalt Psychology, Köhler criticized the concepts of introspection, a sub-discipline in psychology that was dominant in Germany throughout the late 1800s and early 1900s. Stemming from the ideas of the structuralist psychologists, introspection was defined as the self-reporting of conscious thoughts and sensations. It was believed that consciousness could be understood by breaking its elements down into basic parts.

Köhler was quick to dismiss this train of thought. He claimed that the introspectionists were too subjective in their methodologies and did not test for reliability in their findings. For example, the description of sensing the colour red made by one individual may not be the same as the description of another. Where the introspectionists failed was their inability to adequately replicate particular findings. If one person was tested for sensations regarding the colour red, these descriptions were simply shared among followers of the discipline. These descriptions were automatically taken as valid, and no further testing of a particular sensation took place. In addition to this, Köhler claimed that introspection did not focus on immediate problems regarding direct human experience. He believed that an important goal of empirical science was to obtain objective results that apply to almost everyone. The introspectionists, according to Köhler, did not consider objective experience a key point in their science.

== Opinions on behaviorism ==
Köhler was also vocal in his stance against behaviorism, another competing school of thought in North America. At the time, behaviourism focused solely on overt acts that were easily observable and measurable. Inner thoughts, feelings, and processes that occurred between the presentation of a stimulus and the onset of behaviour were considered part of a black box not easily understood. This black box, which could be described as cognition today, was not accessible and therefore should be discarded from psychology as being something unimportant. Köhler criticized the behaviourists' dismissal of direct experience. They said that it was not measurable, and therefore did not contribute to the furthering of human understanding.

Köhler analyzed the difference between overt and covert behaviours. He argued that the behaviourists focused solely on overt behaviours in order to make inferences concerning human functioning. Using his background in physiology, Köhler suggested that covert behaviours (such as heart rate and blood pressure) could offer additional insight into how we function and interact with the environment. In Gestalt Psychology, Köhler describes advancements made in physiological research and the tools created to measure covert behaviours. Covert behaviours such as increased heart rate could provide additional insight into how people interact with particular stimuli. The behaviourists, according to Köhler, never adequately utilized these new instruments to make sound inferences on human behaviour.

Köhler argued against the idea that direct experience was not measurable or usable. Drawing upon his personal experience and interest in the field of physics, Köhler posed the example of two physicists observing a galvanometer (an instrument that detects and measures electric current) and making inferences based on the information it provides. According to Köhler, behaviourists act in a similar way when observing behaviours. One behaviourist will observe a behaviour and share results, leading to an extension of these findings by others in the field. While behaviourism denies direct experience, Köhler suggests that behaviourists are unknowingly accepting it in this regard. Just as the galvanometer is independent of the physicist, so is the subject from the behaviourist. Direct experience results in the observation of phenomena and leads to results. In this regard, he felt that the standpoint of the behaviourists appears somewhat paradoxical.

== Psychological Institute in Berlin ==
Köhler returned to Germany in 1920 and was appointed the acting director, and then (as Carl Stumpf's successor) professor and director of the Psychological Institute at the University of Berlin, where he remained until 1935. In those fifteen years, his accomplishments were considerable, including, for example, the directorship of the school's prestigious graduate program in psychology; the co-founding of an influential journal about perceptual psychology, titled Psychologische Forschung (Psychological Research: Journal of Psychology and its Neighboring Fields); and the authorship of an early book titled Gestalt Psychology (1929), written especially for an American audience. During the 1920s and early 1930s psychology reached a high point at the institute. Aside from Köhler, many other influential minds were at work. Max Wertheimer was part of the institute from 1916 to 1929, until he left to take a position in Frankfurt. In addition, Kurt Lewin remained at the institute until 1933 (the year of his resignation). Köhler also had many well-known assistants at the institute, including Karl Duncker, whose work revolved around problem solving and induced movement. Von Lauenstein, another assistant of Köhler, is known mainly for his investigation of time errors and memory. Finally, von Restorff is best known for her collaboration efforts with Köhler on both the isolation effect and theory of recall.

== Nazi Germany ==
The Nazi party, led by Adolf Hitler, rose to power on January 30, 1933. The regime started practicing discriminatory policies against Jews, and dismissed any professors with a Jewish background from German universities. Max Planck, the well-known physicist, petitioned Hitler to stop the dismissal of Jewish professors, stressing their importance regarding scientific contributions. Hitler has been quoted as responding to Planck, "if the dismissal of Jewish scientists means the annihilation of contemporary German science, then we shall do without science for a few years".

Köhler did not make a public stand against the Nazi regime until the end of April 1933. During the beginning of that month, he still expressed ambivalence as to how serious a threat was posed by the regime. He was wary, but did not become more active against the Nazis until they forced the dismissal of Karl Planck, another well-known experimental physicist. On April 28, 1933, Köhler wrote an article titled "Gespräche in Deutschland" (Conversations in Germany). It was written for the Deutsche Allgemeine Zeitung and is officially the last published article that openly attacked the Nazi Regime during their reign.

After the article was published, Köhler expected immediate arrest. But, the Nazis did not come for him. Even four months after the article was originally published, reprints were still being distributed. Köhler received numerous letters from Jews and non-Jews, expressing their gratitude and admiring his courage. To strengthen his stance against the Nazis, Köhler also sought assistance from his colleagues. To his disappointment, many of his colleagues refused to become involved in the anti-Nazi movement. Some suggested the Nazis would not be able to take over the large and complex German political system. In addition, some colleagues argued that Köhler's resistance fell outside their particular spheres of influence. In turn, they could contribute nothing.

On November 3, 1933, the Nazi government demanded that professors begin their lectures by giving the Nazi salute. Köhler thought this was a violation of his own beliefs and told his students that he was unable to engage in such an act. His explanation was met with applause, from both Nazi sympathizers and rebels alike. His situation at the institute began to deteriorate more quickly after this statement. In December 1933, Nazi officials stood outside Köhler's seminar room. As students left, the officials stopped them and examined their student cards. Although Köhler did not interfere, he later contacted the institute rector, Eugen Fischer, complaining that an unannounced raid had occurred. After much disagreement and several more unannounced inspections of his students, Köhler took the situation further since his wishes were not being considered nor respected. He requested retirement from the institution in May 1934. This drew the attention of the Ministry and they would finally intervene in July 1934 by running an investigation of the interactions between Köhler and the rector as well as the personal attacks he received from the German student organizations.

== Later life ==
After being left out of important decision making of the Psychological Institute of the University of Berlin and losing important assistants, who represented new points of view, Köhler found it impossible to continue his work. Köhler officially resigned from the Psychological Institute of the University of Berlin and emigrated to the USA in 1935. He was offered a professorship at Swarthmore College, where he served on the faculty for twenty years.

In 1956, he became a research professor at Dartmouth College. Soon after, he also served as the president of the American Psychological Association. He lectured freely in the United States and made yearly visits to the Free University of Berlin. Here, he acted as an adviser for the faculty. He kept the psychologists in touch with American psychology by collaborating with them in research and enthusiastically engaging in discussions with them. He died in 1967 in Enfield, New Hampshire.

== Family life ==
Köhler married the painter and sculptor Thekla Achenbach in 1912. They had two children in Germany (Claus, born 1912 and Marianne, born 1913) and two more when they lived in Tenerife (Peter, born 1915 and Martin, born 1918). This marriage ended in divorce and in 1927 he married Lili Harlemann by whom he had a daughter, Karin (born 1928).

== Legacy and honors ==
- 1928, elected International Honorary Member of the American Academy of Arts and Sciences
- 1939, elected member of the American Philosophical Society
- 1947, elected member of the United States National Academy of Sciences
- 1956, Distinguished Scientific Contributions Award of the American Psychological Association.
- In 1967 the Association planned to give him its gold medal, but he died before it could be awarded.
- The Wolfgang Köhler Primate Research Center was established at Leipzig Zoo as a project of the Max Planck Institute for Evolutionary Anthropology, directed by Michael Tomasello and Josep Call.

== Bibliography ==
These are the editions in English:

- 1925. The mentality of apes, transl. from the 2nd German edition by Ella Winter. London: Kegan, Trench and New York: Harcourt, Brace and World. Original was Intelligenzprüfungen an Anthropoiden, Berlin 1917. 2nd German edition was titled Intelligenzprüfungen an Menschenaffen, Berlin: Springer 1921. Liveright 1976 reprint: ISBN 978-0871401083
- 1929. Gestalt psychology. New York: Liveright. London: Bell 1930. A heavily revised translation into German, Psychologische Probleme, was published in 1933 by Springer, Berlin.
- 1938. The place of value in a world of facts. New York: Liveright. Norton reprint 1976: ISBN 978-0871401076
- 1940. Dynamics in psychology. New York: Liveright.
- 1947. Gestalt psychology: an introduction to new concepts in modern psychology. New York: Liveright. A revised edition of the 1929 book. Norton 1992 reprint: ISBN 978-0871402189
- 1969. The task of gestalt psychology. Princeton University Press. ISBN 978-0691086149
- 1971. Henle, Mary (ed). The selected papers of Wolfgang Köhler. New York: Liveright. ISBN 978-0871402530

== See also ==
- Bouba/kiki effect
- Berlin school of experimental psychology
- Max Wertheimer
- Kurt Koffka
- Kurt Lewin
- Pál Schiller Harkai
- Rudolf Arnheim

== Sources ==
- Ash, Mitchell G. Gestalt Psychology in German Culture, 1890–1967: Holism and the Quest for Objectivity. Cambridge: Cambridge Studies in the History of Psychology, 1996.
- Benjafield, J. G. "Revisiting Wittgenstein on Köhler and Gestalt psychology," Journal of Historical Behavior, vol. 44, no. 2 (2008), pp. 99–118.
- Ellis, Willis D. A Source Book of Gestalt Psychology. New York: Routledge, 1999.
- Henle, Mary. (1978). One man against the Nazis — Wolfgang Kohler. American Psychologist, 33, 939–944.
- Henle, M. (1993). "Man's place in nature in the thinking of Wolfgang Köhler". Journal of the History of the Behavioral Sciences, 29, 3–7.
- Jaeger, Siegfried. Gestaltpsychologie : Wolfgang Köhler und seine Zeit. Berlin: Universitätsbibliothek der Freien Universität Berlin, 1990.
- King, D. Brett, and Michael Wertheimer. Max Wertheimer and Gestalt Theory. Piscataway: Transaction Publishers, 2007.
- Müller, M. (1987). "Wolfgang Köhler in Germany: His life, word and influence until the beginning of the 1930s." Gestalt Theory, 9, 288–298.
- Seidner, Stanley S. (1989). "Köhler's Dilemma", In Issues of Language Assessment. vol 3. Ed., Stanley S. Seidner. Springfield, Il.: State Board of Education.
- Smith, Barry (1988). Foundations of Gestalt Theory, Munich and Vienna: Philosophia
- Von Hornbostel, Erich M. "The unity of the senses," Psyche, vol. 7, no. 28, (1927), pp. 83–89.
