= The Crisis of European Sciences and Transcendental Phenomenology =

1936 book by Edmund Husserl

The Crisis of European Sciences and Transcendental Phenomenology: An Introduction to Phenomenological Philosophy
- Author: Edmund Husserl
- Original title: Die Krisis der europäischen Wissenschaften und die transzendentale Phänomenologie: Eine Einleitung in die phänomenologische Philosophie
- Translator: David Carr
- Language: German
- Subject: Phenomenology
- Published: 1936 (in German); 1970 (in English)
- Publication place: Germany
- Media type: Print (Hardcover and Paperback)
- Pages: 405 (English edition)
- ISBN: 978-0810104587

The Crisis of European Sciences and Transcendental Phenomenology: An Introduction to Phenomenological Philosophy (German: Die Krisis der europäischen Wissenschaften und die transzendentale Phänomenologie: Eine Einleitung in die phänomenologische Philosophie) is an unfinished 1936 book by the German philosopher Edmund Husserl.

The work was influential and is considered the culmination of Husserl's thought, though it has been seen as a departure from Husserl's earlier work.

== Summary ==
The work is divided into three main sections: "Part I: The Crisis of the Sciences as Expression of the Radical Life-Crisis of European Humanity", "Part II: Clarification of the Origin of the Modern Opposition between Physicalistic Objectivism and Transcendental Subjectivism", and "Part III: The Clarification of the Transcendental Problem and the Related Function of Psychology".

In Part I, Husserl discusses what he considers a crisis of science, while in Part II he discusses the astronomer Galileo Galilei and introduces the concept of the lifeworld.

== Publication history ==
The Crisis of European Sciences and Transcendental Phenomenology was published by Martinus Nijhoff Publishers in 1954. A second printing followed in 1962. An English translation by David Carr was published by Northwestern University Press in 1970.

== Reception ==
The Crisis of European Sciences and Transcendental Phenomenology is Husserl's most influential work; according to the philosopher Ante Pažanin, it was also the most influential philosophical work of its time. Husserl's discussion of Galileo is famous. The work is considered the culmination of Husserl's thought. It has been compared to Hegel's The Phenomenology of Spirit by the philosophers Maurice Natanson and Michael Inwood, and described as a "great work". Natanson argued that Husserl's views can be compared to those of the novelist Fyodor Dostoevsky, despite the differences between the two. Inwood argued that in The Crisis of European Sciences and Transcendental Phenomenology Husserl adopted a philosophical approach that differed from the one he had employed in earlier works such as Ideas (1913) and Cartesian Meditations (1931). In his view, the work brought into question Husserl's attempt to found a rigorous science that would be free from all preconceptions. He noted that some philosophers, including Maurice Merleau-Ponty, considered it a significant departure from Husserl's earlier work.

Carr described the work as important, while R. Philip Buckley maintained that its themes continue to be relevant to contemporary philosophy. Buckley credited Husserl with providing a powerful "critique of the development of modern science". However, he suggested that the book's history makes it clear that Husserl found it a struggle to "give clearer expression to his ideas and to unify them into a coherent whole" while working on it. He noted that Husserl was dissatisfied with Part III of the work and wanted to revise it. He also argued that the work left some problems unresolved, including the question of how the decay of philosophy and science has made the existence of that decay apparent. Dan R. Stiver maintained that because The Crisis of European Sciences and Transcendental Phenomenology is unfinished, its interpretation is "notoriously difficult." He maintained that in it, Husserl adopted views that placed his belief in the possibility of basing philosophy on the "direct givenness to intuition of what is experienced" under severe strain. He argued that while one of Husserl's comments has been seen as expressing his awareness of the failure of phenomenology, it was more likely that Husserl wanted to recognize that "what had been a burgeoning program attracting many disciples had fallen to the wayside with its founder, having been overtaken by other philosophical movements."

The philosopher Richard Velkley considered Husserl's reflections on the lifeworld to be among the "most striking and fundamental" of the new concerns that Husserl developed in response to his awareness of a contemporary moral and political crisis. However, he considered details of Husserl's account of science open to question. The philosopher Roger Scruton used Husserl's concept of the lifeworld to explore the nature of human sexuality. He maintained that Husserl correctly recognized that the lifeworld is given intersubjectively, but that the "transcendental psychology" Husserl adopted in association with the idea of its intersubjectivity is flawed. The economist Peter Galbács wrote that some researchers used the work to show how other disciplines, such as mainstream economics, shared the crisis of modern sciences.
