= Britta Böhler =

Dutch politician and lawyer

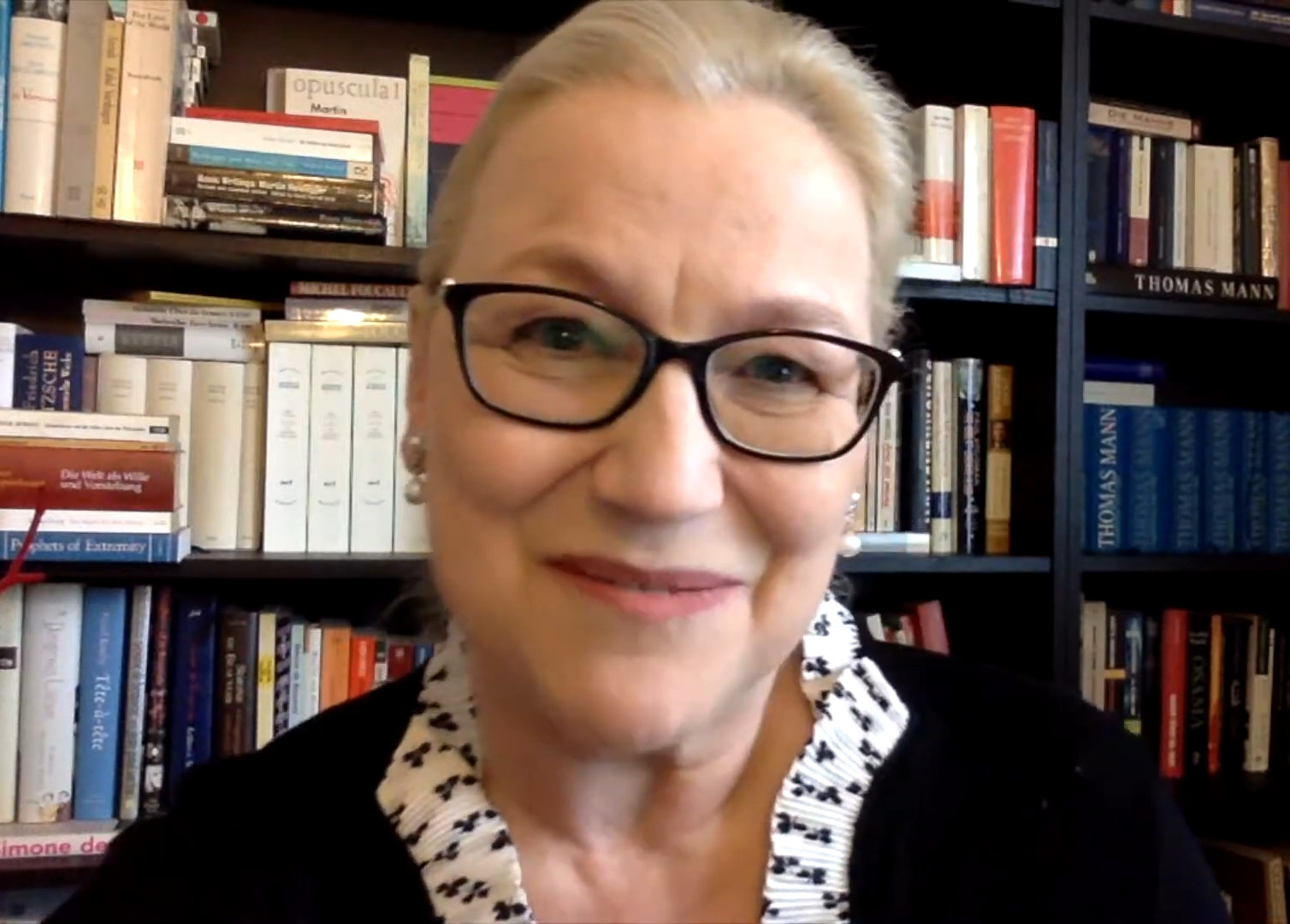
- Böhler in 2019

GreenLeft member of the Senate
- In office 2007–2011

Personal details
- Born: 17 May 1960 (age 65) Freiburg im Breisgau, West Germany
- Party: GreenLeft

Britta Böhler (born 17 July 1960) is a Dutch lawyer in international law and human rights, and a former member of the Dutch Senate for the GreenLeft Party. She was born in West Germany and became a Dutch citizen to run for political office.

== Early life, education and academia ==
Böhler was born in Freiburg, West Germany. Her father was the financial director of a publishing house and her mother, a civil servant. Both her parents were members of the Social Democratic Party of Germany.

After attending public grammar school and the Goethe Gymnasium, Böhler began the study of law and philosophy in 1979 at the Albert-Ludwigs Universität in Freiburg. She chose law because it would allow her flexibility in the Germany of the seventies. Between 1979 and 1980 she also studied economics, and between 1980 and 1982, political science. In 1984, she graduated in law, specializing in criminal law. During her studies she became sympathetic toward the people of Palestine, and Marxism. Between 2012 and 2017, Böhler was a professor at the University of Amsterdam. In April 2019, she assumed as a law and ethics professor at the University of Maastricht.

== Lawyer ==
In 1985, Böhler became a lawyer in Munich. She also was a referendar, (a type of associate in a law office) and PhD candidate in law. In 1989, she became a lawyer at the law firm Peat Marwick in Frankfurt am Main, working mainly in corporate law. In 1991, she moved to Amsterdam, where she was employed at Loeff Claeys Verbeke (now Loyens & Loeff). In 1992, Böhler received a PhD in law from Albert-Ludwigs Universität: having written a thesis on the legal philosopher, Gerhart Husserl: Leben und Werk (Life and Work).

In 1994, she served as an observer at the South African general elections, the first elections after the dismantling of Apartheid. South Africa and its people left a strong impression on Böhler and led her to politicize her practice of law. Between 1994 and 1995 she was a lawyer at Van den Biessen en Prakke, a left wing law firm. In 1995, she became a partner at Böhler Franken Koppe Wijngaarden, a law firm that works on "the border between politics and law", where she specialized in international law and human rights.

There, she worked on several political cases. These are cases in which, according to Böhler, the case is about more than the hearing of the trial of a crime, where the political aspect, the history and the motivation of the client matter. Böhler defended Kurdistan Workers' Party (PKK) leader Abdullah Öcalan in 1999, and was described by the Turkish authorities as a PKK militant and expelled from Turkey. She also defended Volkert van der Graaf, the murderer of Pim Fortuyn, since 2002 and represented people who did not want Jorge Zorreguieta to attend the marriage of his daughter Máxima Zorreguieta and crown prince Willem-Alexander. In 2005, she defended Samir Azzouz, member of the Hofstadgroep. She also was legal counsel for Ayaan Hirsi Ali during the crisis about her nationality.

Böhler has received several awards for her work, including the Dean Award for best lawyer in Amsterdam in 2003 and the Clara Wichmann prize in 2005. In 2003 she appeared on the program "Zomergasten", a 4-hour marathon interview.

In addition to her work as a lawyer, Böhler also held several positions in civil society. Between 1994 and 1999, she was secretary of Greenpeace Netherlands, between 2002 and 2003, she was chair. Between 1995 and 2003, she was a member of the board of Lawyers for Lawyers. She is currently a lawyer at Prakken d'Oliveira Human Rights Lawyers.

== Member of the Senate ==
In November 2006, Böhler announced her candidacy for Senate as a member of the GreenLeft party. In 2006, she had advised the Socialist Party on their election program. She changed to GreenLeft because "self realization and the individual take a central place in their program and because the party pays close attention to the conservation and defense of the principles of the Rechtsstaat". In February 2007 she was placed on second place on the list, behind Tof Thissen. In order to run for office, Böhler had to obtain Dutch citizenship. She was elected to the Senate in 2007.

In the Senate, Böhler managed the portfolios of finance, defense and justice and agriculture. She gave her maiden speech on the law on police records.

She was a member of the committees on European Cooperation, Finance, Justice, Agriculture, Nature and food quality, Social affairs and employment, Defense, Development cooperation and housing, Spatial planning and the environment / housing and integration, as well as the committee on Justice and Home Affairs Council, which oversees Police and Judicial Co-operation in Criminal Matters of the European Union.

== Publications ==
- "Gerhart Husserl: Leben und Werk" (1992, thesis)
- "De zwerftocht van een leider: Achter de schermen van de zaak Öcalan" (2004)
- "Crisis in de rechtspraak. Spraakmakende zaken, verborgen processen" (2004)
