= Urdoxa =

Urdoxa is a portmanteau of the German prefix ur- (primary, fundamental) and the Ancient Greek δόξα (doxa), thus meaning "primary" or "first" doctrine. For Plato and Aristotle, the notion of "doxa" meant "opinion".

The term grew in popular usage in the work of Edmund Husserl whose phenomenological project was indexed on attempting, via the descriptive method, to ground the notion of a proto-doxa or Urdoxa of experience. The term has since paled in poststructuralist discourse, and usually carries a negative connotation insofar as it assumes a transcendental subjectivity which overly privileges a humanistic conception of Being (see Michel Foucault, The Order of Things). Against such anthropocentricity, the term has fallen into relative disuse.

Two other notable uses of the term have appeared since the year 2000: a progressive musical ensemble by the name of Thork produced an album entitled Urdoxa (2000), and a novel by the Canadian author Kane X. Faucher also has this term as its title (2004).
