= List of phenomenologists =

This is a list of phenomenologists

- Edmund Husserl
- Martin Heidegger
- Heinrich Rombach
- Edith Stein
- Moritz Geiger
- Aron Gurwitsch
- Alfred Schütz
- Hannah Arendt
- Felix Kaufmann
- Roman Ingarden
- Georg Wilhelm Friedrich Hegel
- Dietrich von Hildebrand
- Herbert Spiegelberg
- Maurice Merleau-Ponty
- Jean-Paul Sartre
- Emmanuel Levinas
- Jacques Taminiaux
- Maurice Natanson
- Hubert Dreyfus
- Shaun Gallagher
- Dan Zahavi
- John Daniel Wild
- James M. Edie
- Karol Wojtyła
- Edward S. Casey
- Burt C. Hopkins
- Jean-Luc Marion
- Ryan Black
