= Psychologism =

Philosophical position regarding the role of psychology

Psychologism (or logical psychologism) is a family of philosophical positions, according to which logical laws, truths, or principles are grounded in, reducible to, or explained by psychological facts, laws, or processes.

The term was coined by Johann Eduard Erdmann as Psychologismus, being translated into English as psychologism.

== Definition ==
The Oxford English Dictionary defines psychologism as: "The view or doctrine that a theory of psychology or ideas forms the basis of an account of metaphysics, epistemology, or meaning; (sometimes) spec. the explanation or derivation of mathematical or logical laws in terms of psychological facts." Psychologism in epistemology, the idea that its problems "can be solved satisfactorily by the psychological study of the development of mental processes", was argued in John Locke's An Essay Concerning Human Understanding (1690).

Other forms of psychologism are logical psychologism and mathematical psychologism. Logical psychologism is a position in logic (or the philosophy of logic) according to which logical laws and mathematical laws are grounded in, derived from, explained or exhausted by psychological facts or laws. Psychologism in the philosophy of mathematics is the position that mathematical concepts and/or truths are grounded in, derived from or explained by psychological facts or laws.

== Viewpoints ==
John Stuart Mill was accused by Edmund Husserl of being an advocate of a type of logical psychologism, although this may not have been the case. So were many nineteenth-century German philosophers such as Christoph von Sigwart, Benno Erdmann, Theodor Lipps, Gerardus Heymans, Wilhelm Jerusalem, and Theodor Elsenhans, as well as a number of psychologists, past and present (e.g., Wilhelm Wundt and Gustave Le Bon).

Psychologism was notably criticized by Gottlob Frege in his anti-psychologistic work The Foundations of Arithmetic, and many of his works and essays, including his review of Husserl's Philosophy of Arithmetic. Husserl, in the first volume of his Logical Investigations, called "The Prolegomena of Pure Logic", criticized psychologism thoroughly and sought to distance himself from it. Frege's arguments were largely ignored, while Husserl's were widely discussed.

In "Psychologism and Behaviorism", Ned Block describes psychologism in the philosophy of mind as the view that "whether behavior is intelligent behavior depends on the character of the internal information processing that produces it." This is in contrast to a behavioral view which would state that intelligence can be ascribed to a being solely via observing its behavior. This latter type of behavioral view is strongly associated with the Turing test.

== See also ==
- Antipsychologism
- Antireductionism
- Blockhead argument
- Naturalized epistemology
