= Landgrebe =

Landgrebe is a German surname. Notable people with the surname include:

- Earl F. Landgrebe (1916–1986), American politician and businessman
- Gudrun Landgrebe (born 1950), German actress
- Ludwig Landgrebe (1902–1991), Austrian phenomenologist
