= Cartesian Meditations =

Book by Edmund Husserl

Cartesian Meditations: An Introduction to Phenomenology
- Cover of the French edition
- Author: Edmund Husserl
- Language: French
- Subject: Phenomenology
- Published: 1931
- Media type: Print

Cartesian Meditations: An Introduction to Phenomenology (French: Méditations cartésiennes: Introduction à la phénoménologie) is a book by the philosopher Edmund Husserl, based on four lectures he gave at the Sorbonne, in the Amphithéatre Descartes on February 23 and 25, 1929. Over the next two years, he and his assistant Eugen Fink expanded and elaborated on the text of these lectures. These expanded lectures were first published in a 1931 French translation by Gabrielle Peiffer and Emmanuel Levinas with advice from Alexandre Koyré. They were published in German, along with the original Pariser Vorträge, in 1950, and again in an English translation by Dorion Cairns in 1960, based on a typescript of the text (Typescript C) which Husserl had designated for Cairns in 1933.

The Cartesian Meditations were never published in German during Husserl's lifetime, a fact which has led some commentators to conclude that Husserl had become dissatisfied with the work in relation to its aim, namely an introduction to transcendental phenomenology. The text introduces the main features of Husserl's mature transcendental phenomenology, including (not exhaustively) the transcendental reduction, the epoché, static and genetic phenomenology, eidetic reduction, and eidetic phenomenology. In the Fourth Meditation, Husserl argues that transcendental phenomenology is nothing other than transcendental idealism.

The name Cartesian Meditations refers to René Descartes' Meditations on First Philosophy. Thus Husserl wrote:

France's greatest thinker, René Descartes, gave transcendental phenomenology new Impulses through his Meditations; their study acted quite directly on the transformation of an already developing phenomenology into a new kind of transcendental philosophy. Accordingly one might almost call transcendental phenomenology a neo-Cartesianism, even though It Is obliged — and precisely by its radical development of Cartesian motifs — to reject nearly all the well-known doctrinal content of the Cartesian philosophy.

— Edmund Husserl, Cartesian Meditations

== Contents ==
The work is divided into five "meditations" of varying length, whose contents are as follows:

1. First Meditation: The Way to the Transcendental Ego
2. Second Meditation: The Field of Transcendental Experience
3. Third Meditation: Constitutional Problems
4. Fourth Meditation: Constitutional Problems Pertaining to the Transcendental Ego Itself
5. Fifth Meditation: Transcendental Being as Monadological Intersubjectivity

== Editions ==
- Méditations Cartésiennes: Introduction à la phénoménologie. 1931. Gabrielle Peiffer and Emmanuel Levinas, trans. Paris: Armand Collin.
- Méditations Cartésiennes: Introduction à la phénoménologie. 1947. Gabrielle Peiffer and Emmanuel Levinas, trans. Paris: Vrin.
- Cartesian Meditations. 1960. Dorion Cairns, trans. The Hague: Martinus Nijhoff.
