= Anti-psychologism =

Theory that logical truth exists independent of human ideas

In logic and philosophy, anti-psychologism (sometimes associated with logical objectivism and, in stronger forms, with logical realism) is the theory that logical truth does not depend upon the contents of human ideas, but exists independent of human ideas.

== Overview ==
The anti-psychologistic treatment of logic originated in the works of Immanuel Kant and Bernard Bolzano.

The concept of logical objectivism or anti-psychologism was further developed by Johannes Rehmke (founder of Greifswald objectivism) and Gottlob Frege (founder of logicism the most famous anti-psychologist in the philosophy of mathematics), and has been the center of an important debate in early phenomenology and analytical philosophy. Frege's work was likely influenced by Bolzano.

Elements of anti-psychologism in the historiography of philosophy can be found in the work of the members of the 1830s speculative theist movement of Christian Hermann Weisse, the late work of Hermann Lotze, and the work of neo-Kantians Alois Riehl and Paul Natorp.

The psychologism dispute (German: Psychologismusstreit) in 19th-century German-speaking philosophy is closely related to the contemporary internalism and externalism debate in epistemology; psychologism is often construed as a kind of internalism (the thesis that no fact about the world can provide reasons for action independently of desires and beliefs) and anti-psychologism as a kind of externalism (the thesis that reasons are to be identified with objective features of the world).

Psychologism was defended by Theodor Lipps, Gerardus Heymans, Wilhelm Wundt, Wilhelm Jerusalem, Christoph von Sigwart, Theodor Elsenhans, and Benno Erdmann.

Edmund Husserl was another important proponent of anti-psychologism, and this trait passed on to other phenomenologists, such as Martin Heidegger, whose doctoral thesis was meant to be a refutation of psychologism. They shared the argument that, because the proposition "no-p is a not-p" is not logically equivalent to "It is thought that 'no-p is a not-p'", psychologism does not logically stand.

Charles Sanders Peirce—whose fields included logic, philosophy, and experimental psychology—could also be considered a critic of psychologism in logic.

== The return of psychologism ==
Psychologism is not widely held amongst logicians today, but something like it has some high-profile defenders especially among those who do research at the intersection of logic and cognitive science, for example Dov Gabbay and John Woods, who concluded that "whereas mathematical logic must eschew psychologism, the new logic cannot do without it".

== See also ==
- Logical law
