= Claire Ortiz Hill =

American philosopher (1951–2025)

Claire Ortiz Hill (May 11, 1951 – December 4, 2025) was an American independent scholar, hermit, translator and author of books on phenomenological philosophy, specializing in the works of Edmund Husserl, the philosophy of logic and the philosophy of mathematics.

== Life and education ==
Ortiz Hill was from Santa Fe, New Mexico, where her ancestors have lived since the 17th century. Her mother, Adelina Ortiz de Hill (1929–2014) was a fiesta and rodeo queen, nurse, author, and local historian, named as a "Santa Fe Living Treasure" in 2011. Her father, Milford Hill, worked as an employment counselor.

She earned bachelor's and master's degrees from the University of California, Riverside, and a second master's degree and doctorate from Paris-Sorbonne University. She also studied German in Leipzig and Halle.

Ortiz Hill was a devout Catholic and lived as a diocesan hermit in the archdiocese of Paris. She died in Paris on December 4, 2025, at the age of 74.

== Books ==
Ortiz Hill's books include:

- Word and Object in Husserl, Frege, and Russell: The Roots of Twentieth-Century Philosophy (Ohio University Press, 1991)
- Rethinking Identity and Metaphysics: On the Foundations of Analytic Philosophy (Yale University Press, 1997)
- Husserl or Frege?: Meaning, Objectivity, and Mathematics (with Guillermo E. Rosado Haddock, Open Court, 2000)
- The Roots and Flowers of Evil in Baudelaire, Nietzsche and Hitler (Open Court, 2006)
- Facing the Light: Ten Mystical Stories (with Jacqueline Wegmann, Lone Butte Press, 2010)
- The Road Not Taken, On Husserl's Philosophy of Logic and Mathematics (with Jairo José da Silva, College Publications, 2013)

She translated Husserl's Introduction to Logic and Theory of Knowledge: Lectures 1906/07 (Springer, 2008) and Logic and General Theory of Science (Springer, 2019) from German into English, and Anna-Teresa Tymieniecka's The Fullness of the Logos in the Key of Life (as La Plénitude du Logos dans le registre de la vie, L'Harmattan, 2011) from French into English.
