= Elsenhans =

Elsenhans is a German surname. Notable people with the surname include:

- Hartmut Elsenhans (1941–2024), German political scientist
- Lynn Elsenhans, American businesswoman
- Theodor Elsenhans (1862–1918), German psychologist and philosopher
