= Logical Investigations =

Logical Investigations (German: Logische Untersuchungen) can refer to:

- Logical Investigations (Trendelenburg), 1840 work by Friedrich Adolf Trendelenburg
- Logical Investigations (Husserl), 1900–1901 work by Edmund Husserl
- Logical Investigations (Frege), 1918–1923 work by Gottlob Frege

== See also ==
- Investigations into Logical Deduction (Untersuchungen über das logische Schließen), 1934/5 work by Gerhard Gentzen
