= Noema =

Term in phenomenology

The word noema (plural: noemata) derives from the Greek word νόημα meaning "mental object". The philosopher Edmund Husserl used noema as a technical term in phenomenology to stand for the object or content of a thought, judgement, or perception, but its precise meaning in his work has remained a matter of controversy.

== Husserl's noema ==
In Ideas: General Introduction to Pure Phenomenology (1913), Husserl continued and built on the (ancient to modern Greek to early modern German Idealism philosophies') terms "noema" (/noʊˈiːmə/) and "noesis" (/noʊˈiːsɪs/) to designate correlated elements of the structure of any intentional act—for example, an act of perceiving, or judging, or remembering:

"Corresponding to all points to the manifold data of the real (reelle) noetic content, there is a variety of data displayable in really pure (wirklicher reiner) intuition, and in a correlative 'noematic content,' or briefly 'noema'—terms which we shall henceforth be continually using."

Every intentional act has noetic content (or a noesis—from the Greek nous, "mind"). This noetic content, to which the noema corresponds, is that mental act–process (e.g., an act of liking, of judging, of meaning, etc.) which becomes directed towards the intentionally held object (e.g., the liked as liked, judged as judged, or meant as meant). That is to say, every act has, as part of its formation, a noematic correlate, which is the object of the act—that which is intended by it. In other words, every intentional act has an "I-pole (the origin of the noesis)" and an "object-pole (or noema)." Husserl also refers to the noema as the Sinn or sense (meaning) of the act, and sometimes appears to use the terms interchangeably. Nevertheless, the Sinn does not represent what Husserl calls the "full noema": Sinn belongs to the noema, but the full noema is the object of the act as meant in the act, the perceived object as perceived, the judged object as judged, and so on. In other words, the noema seems to be whatever is intended by acts of perception or judgement in general, whether it be "a material object, a picture, a word, a mathematical entity, another person" precisely as being perceived, judged or otherwise thought about.

== Interpreting Husserl ==
In fact, commentators have been unable to achieve consensus on exactly what a noema is. In a recent survey, David Woodruff Smith distinguished four different schools of thought. On one view, to say that the noema is the intentional object of an act of consciousness is to mean that it quite literally is an object. Husserl's student Roman Ingarden, for example, held that both ordinary objects, like chairs and trees, and intentional objects, like a chair precisely as it appears to me, or even a fictional tree, actually exist, but have different "modes" of existence.

An alternative view, developed primarily by Aron Gurwitsch, emphasizes the noema of perceptual experience. Most ordinary objects can be perceived in different ways and from different perspectives (consider looking at a tree from several different positions). For Gurwitsch, what is perceived in each such act is a noema, and the object itself—the tree, say—is to be understood as the collection or system of noemata associated with it. This view has similarities with phenomenalism.

Robert Sokolowski, alternatively, holds that a noema is just the actual object of perception or judgment itself, considered phenomenologically. In other words, the noema of the judgment that "this chair is uncomfortable" is neither an entity (the chair considered as uncomfortable) which exists in addition to the chair itself (but with a different mode of existence)—as in the Ingarden view—nor is the noema of such a judgment identified with a particular tactile perception of the chair, which, along with other perceptions, constitutes the chair as such—as in the Gurwitsch view. For Sokolowski, rather, the noema is not a separate entity at all, but the chair itself as in this instance perceived or judged. This seems consistent with Husserl's emphasis on the noema as the "perceived as such…remembered as such...judged as such..."

Analytic philosopher Dagfinn Føllesdal, in an influential 1969 paper, proposed a Fregean interpretation of the noema, which has been developed extensively by Ronald McIntyre and David Woodruff Smith. This school of thought agrees that the noema is not a separate entity, but—rather than identifying it with the actual object of the act (of perceiving, judging, etc.), phenomenologically understood—this view suggests that it is a mediating component of the act itself; it is what gives the act the sense it has. Indeed, Føllesdal and his followers suggest that the noema is a generalized version of Gottlob Frege's account of linguistic meaning, and in particular of his concept of sense (Sinn). Just as Frege held that a linguistic expression picks out its reference by means of its sense, so Husserl believed that conscious acts generally—that is, not only acts of meaning, but also acts of perception, judgment, etc.—are intentionally directed toward objects by means of their noemata. On this view, the noema is not an object, but an abstract component of certain types of acts.

Sokolowski has continued to reject this approach, arguing that "(t)o equate sense and noema would be to equate propositional and phenomenological reflection. It would take philosophy simply as the critical reflection on our meanings or senses; it would equate philosophy with linguistic analysis." Robert C. Solomon attempted to reconcile the perception-based interpretation of the Gurwitsch school with the Fregean interpretation of noema as sense, suggesting that while "(i)t has now become virtually axiomatic among phenomenologists that the Sinne [senses] of experience stand independent of the Bedeutungen [meanings] of linguistic expressions. It has become all but axiomatic among analytic philosophers that there is no meaning apart from language. It is the concept of the noema that provides the link between them. The noema embodies both the changing phases of experience and the organizing sense of our experience. But these two 'components' are not separable, for all experience requires meaning, not as an after-the-fact luxury in reflective judgements but in order for it to be experience of anything."

== Other uses ==
In rhetoric, noema is speech that is intentionally obscure, so that its meaning only becomes clear after contemplation. This sense of the word derives from Quintilian's Institutio Oratoria, a treatise on rhetoric dating from about 95 CE, and it was employed in English by the 1500s. In the early 1600s, the composer and music theorist Joachim Burmeister applied terminology from classical rhetoric to music. Burmeister used noema to designate the technique of emphasizing part of a polyphonic composition by interrupting it with a homophonic passage.

== See also ==
- Intentionality
- Noetics
- Noumenon
- Phenomenology
