= Johannes Rehmke =

German philosopher

- Born: 1 February 1848; Hainholz near Elmshorn, Duchy of Holstein
- Died: 23 December 1930; Marburg, Germany

Education
- Education: University of Kiel; University of Zurich (PhD, 1873); University of Berlin (Dr. phil. hab., 1884)
- Theses: Hartmanns Unbewußtes auf die Logik hin kritisch beleuchtet (Hartmann's Unconscious Critically Examined from a Logical Standpoint) (1873); Die Welt als Wahrnehmung und Begriff (The World as Percept and Concept) (1880/84)

Philosophical work
- Era: 19th-century philosophy
- Region: Western philosophy
- School: Continental philosophy Immanent philosophy Greifswald objectivism
- Institutions: University of Greifswald
- Main interests: Epistemology
- Notable ideas: Criticism of subjectivism Anti-psychologism

Johannes Rehmke (1 February 1848 – 23 December 1930) was a German philosopher and since 1885 professor at Greifswald University, later also provost of this university. He offered sharp criticisms of Immanuel Kant's approach to epistemology. In his article "The Conquest of Subjectivism," Paul Ferdinand Linke pointed out that it was Rehmke who first made a courageous break from subjectivism, which was the pervasive philosophical paradigm in late modern German philosophy.

== Biography ==
John Rehmke was born on 1 February 1848 in Hainholz near Elmshorn, the second son of school teacher Hans Hinrich Rehmke and his wife Margaret, née Engelbrecht. After his first lessons from his father, he attended the elementary school in Uetersen and then the Gymnasium Christianeum in Altona, where among others Helmuth von Moltke was his classmate. In 1867 he went to study at the University of Kiel, then a year later to the University of Zurich to study under the Swiss theologian Alois Emanuel Biedermann.

Rehmke earned his doctorate in 1873 at Zurich with the thesis Hartmanns Unbewußtes auf die Logik hin kritisch beleuchtet (Hartmann's Unconscious Critically Examined from a Logical Standpoint; a work on Karl Robert Eduard von Hartmann) and his habilitation in 1884 at the University of Berlin with his 1880 monograph Die Welt als Wahrnehmung und Begriff (The World as Percept and Concept).

Rehmke admired the works of William James and visited him. Since 1885, Rehmke was professor of philosophy at Greifswald University. In 1921, Rehmke was forced by local Nazi-groups (among them student organisations) to give up his professorship at Greifswald. He died on 23 December 1930 in Marburg and was buried in Greifswald.

== Philosophical work ==
Rehmke was the founder of Greifswald objectivism, a form of anti-psychologism. He opposed individualism on philosophical grounds.

== Works ==
- Die Welt als Wahrnehmung und Begriff (The World as Percept and Concept), 1880.
- Logik oder Philosophie als Wissenslehre (Logic or Philosophy as Theory of Knowledge), 1918.
