= Philosophy of Arithmetic =

1891 book by the philosopher Edmund Husserl

- Author: Edmund Husserl
- Original title: Philosophie der Arithmetik
- Translator: Dallas Willard
- Language: English
- Subject: Philosophy of mathematics
- Publisher: Kluwer Academic Publishers
- Publication date: 1891
- English publication date: 2003
- Media type: Print (Hardcover)
- Pages: 580
- ISBN: 1-4020-1546-1
- OCLC: 52858552
- Dewey Decimal: 510/.1 22
- LC Class: QA9 .H813 2003

Philosophy of Arithmetic: Psychological and Logical Investigations (German: Philosophie der Arithmetik. Psychologische und logische Untersuchungen) is an 1891 book about the philosophy of mathematics by the philosopher Edmund Husserl. Husserl's first published book, it is a synthesis of his studies in mathematics, under Karl Weierstrass, with his studies in philosophy and psychology, under Franz Brentano, to whom it is dedicated, and Carl Stumpf.

== Structure ==
The Philosophy of Arithmetic constitutes the first volume of a work which Husserl intended to comprise two volumes, of which the second was never published. Comprehensively it would have encompassed four parts and an Appendix.

The first volume is divided in two parts, in the first of which Husserl purports to analyse the "Proper concepts of multiplicity, unity and amount" (Die eigentliche Begriffe von Vielheit, Einheit und Anzahl) and in the second "The symbolic amount-concepts and the logical sources of amount-arithmetic" (Die symbolischen Anzahlbegrife und die logischen Quellen der Anzahlen-Arithmetik).

== Content ==
The basic issue of the book is a philosophical analysis of the concept of number, which is the most basic concept on which the entire edifice of arithmetic and mathematics can be founded. In order to proceed with this analysis, Husserl, following Brentano and Stumpf, uses the tools of psychology to look for the "origin and content" of the concept of number. He begins with the classical definition, already given by Euclid, Thomas Hobbes and Gottfried Wilhelm Leibniz, that "number is a multiplicity of unities" and then asks himself: what is multiplicity and what is unity? Anything that we can think of, anything we can present, can be considered at its most basic level to be "something". Multiplicity is then the "collective connection" of "something and something and something etc." In order to get a number instead of a mere quantity, we can also think of these featureless, abstract "somethings" as "ones" and then get "one and one and one etc." as basic definition of number in abstracto. However, these are just the proper numbers, i.e. number which we can conceive of properly, without the help of instruments or symbols. Psychologically we are limited to just the very first few numbers if we want to conceive of them properly, with higher numbers our short-term memory is not enough to think of them all together, but still as identical to themselves and different from all others. Husserl contends that as a result, we must proceed to the analysis of symbolically conceived numbers, which are in essence the numbers used in mathematics.

== History ==
The book is a product of Husserl's years of study with Weierstrass (in Berlin) and his student Leo Königsberger (in Vienna) on the mathematical side and his studies with Brentano (in Vienna) and Stumpf (in Halle) on the psychological/philosophical side. The book is mostly based on his habilitationsschrift of 1887 "On the Concept of Number" (Über den Begriff der Zahl). Husserl also lectured on the concept of number between 1889 and 1891, much in the same vein. He continued working on the second volume up to at least 1894.

Gottlob Frege was critical of Philosophy of Arithmetic, and accused Husserl of relying too much on the metaphysical and not enough on the logical aspects of mathematics. Frege's criticisms influenced negatively the young mathematician's career as a professor. Husserl's Logical Investigations secured his reputation ten years later, but Frege and others never accepted Husserl as a practitioner of true logic.

== Editions ==
The original edition:

   Philosophie der Arithmetik
   Psychologische und logische untersuchungen,
   von Dr. E. G. Husserl. 1. bd.
   1891, xvi, 324 p. 23 cm.
   LC Classification: QA9 .H8
   Dewey Class No.: 510.1
   Other System No.: OCLC 4787664

Husserliana edition:

    Philosophie der Arithmetik
    Psychologische und logische untersuchungen - mit ergänzenden Texten (1890-1901)
    Series: Husserliana - Edmund Husserl Gesammelte werke, Vol. XII
    Husserl, Edmund
    Ed. Eley, Lothar
    1970, 585 p., Hardcover
    ISBN 90-247-0230-5

Official English translation of the Husserliana edition:

    Philosophy of Arithmetic
    Psychological and Logical Investigations - with Supplementary Texts from 1887-1901
    Series: Edmund Husserl Collected Works, Vol. X
    Husserl, Edmund
    Tr. Willard, Dallas
    2003, 580 p., Hardcover
    ISBN 1-4020-1546-1

== Bibliography ==
- Walter Biemel, ‘The decisive phases in the development of Husserl’s philosophy’, in: R.O. Elveton, editor, The Phenomenology of Husserl, Selected critical readings (Chicago: Quadrangle Books, 1970), (Tr. by Elveton, R.O.).
- Francesco Dentoni, Alle radici della fenomenologia (Roma: Abete, 1978).
- Hans-Martin Gerlach and Hans Rainer Sepp, editors, Husserl in Halle, Daedalus (Europäisches Denken in Deutscher Philosophie) 5 (Frankfurt a. M.: Peter Lang GmbH, 1994).
- Burt Hopkins, ‘Authentic and Symbolic Numbers in Husserl’s Philosophy of Arithmetic ’, in The New Yearbook for Phenomenology and Phenomenological Philosophy II (2002), 39–71.
- Edmund Husserl, ‘Persönliche Aufzeichnungen’, in Philosophy and Phenomenological Research XVI (1956), (Ed. W. Biemel).
- Edmund Husserl, ‘Erinnerungen an Franz Brentano’, in: T. Nenon and H.R. Sepp, editors, Husserliana XXV (Den Haag: Nijhoff, 1987).
- Malvine Husserl, ‘Skizze eines Lebensbildes von Edmund Husserl’, in Husserl Studies 5 (1988), 105–125, (ed. Karl Schuhmann).
- Carlo Ierna, ‘Husserl and the Infinite’, in Studia Phaenomenologica III:1–2 (2003), 179–194 .
- Carlo Ierna, “The Beginnings of Husserl’s Philosophy. Part 1: From Über den Begriff der Zahl to Philosophie der Arithmetik”, in The New Yearbook for Phenomenology and Phenomenological Philosophy V (2005), 1-56.
- J. Philip Miller, Numbers in Presence and Absence, Phaenomenologica 90 (Den Haag: Nijhoff, 1982).
- Jitendra Nath Mohanty, ‘Husserl, Frege and the Overcoming of Psychologism’, in: Kah Kyung Cho, editor, Philosophy and Science in phenomenological Perspective, Phaenomenologica 95 (Dordrecht/Boston/Lancaster: Nijhoff, 1984), 143–152.
- Jitendra Nath Mohanty, ‘The Development of Husserl’s thought’, in: B.M. Smith and D.W. Smith, editors, The Cambridge Companion to Husserl (Cambridge: Cambridge University Press, 1995).
- Robin D. Rollinger, Meinong and Husserl on Abstraction and Universals, Studien zur Österreichischen Philosophie XX (Amsterdam – Atlanta: Rodopi, 1993).
- Robin D. Rollinger, Husserl’s Position in the School of Brentano, Phaenomenologica 150 (Dordrecht: Kluwer, 1999).
- Roger Schmit, Husserls Philosophie der Mathematik (Bonn: Bouvier, 1981).
- Karl Schuhmann, Husserl – Chronik (Denk- und Lebensweg Edmund Husserls), Husserliana Dokumente I (Den Haag: Nijhoff, 1977).
- Dallas Willard, Logic and the Objectivity of Knowledge (Athens (Ohio): Ohio University Press, 1984).
