= Intersubjective verifiability =

Concept in epistemology

Intersubjective verifiability is the capacity of a concept to be readily and accurately communicated between individuals ("intersubjectively"), and to be reproduced under varying circumstances for the purposes of verification. It is a core principle of empirical, scientific investigation.

Although there are areas of belief that do not consistently employ intersubjective verifiability (e.g., many religious claims), intersubjective verifiability is a near-universal way of arbitrating truth claims used by people everywhere. In its basic form, it can be found in colloquial expressions, e.g., "I'm from Missouri. Show me!" or "Seeing is believing". The scientific principle of replication of findings by investigators other than those that first reported the phenomenon is simply a more highly structured form of the universal principle of intersubjective verifiability.

== Subjective experience ==
Each individual is a subject, and must subjectively experience the physical world. Each subject has a different perspective and point of view on various aspects of the world. However, by sharing their comparable experiences intersubjectively, individuals may gain an increasingly similar understanding of the world. In this way, many different subjective experiences can come together to form intersubjective ones that are less likely to be prone to individual bias or gaps in knowledge.

While specific internal experiences are not intersubjectively verifiable, the existence of thematic patterns of internal experience can be intersubjectively verified. For example, whether or not people are telling what they believe to be the truth when they make claims can only be known by the claimants. However, we can intersubjectively verify that people almost universally experience discomfort (hunger) when they haven't had enough to eat. We generally have only a crude ability to compare (measure) internal experiences.

== Congruence and incongruence ==
When an external, public phenomenon is experienced and carefully described (in words or measurements) by one individual, other individuals can see if their experiences of the phenomenon "fit" the description. If they do, a sense of congruence between one subject and another occurs. This is the basis for a definition of what is true that is agreed upon by the involved parties. If the description does not fit the experience of one or more of the parties involved, incongruence occurs instead.

Incongruent contradictions between the experience and descriptions of different individuals can be caused by a number of factors. One common source of incongruence is the inconsistent use of language in the descriptions people use, such as the same words being used differently. Such semantic problems require more careful development and use of language.

Incongruence also arises from a failure to describe the phenomenon well. In these cases, further development of the description, model, or theory used to refer to the phenomenona is required.

A third form of incongruence arises when the descriptions do not conform to consensual (i.e., intersubjectively verifiable) experience, such as when the descriptions are faulty, incorrect, wrong, or inaccurate, and need to be replaced by more accurate descriptions, models, or theories.

== Versus belief based on faith ==
The contradiction between the truths derived from intersubjective verification and beliefs based on faith or on appeal to authority (e.g., many religious beliefs) forms the basis for the conflict between religion and science. There have been attempts to bring the two into congruence, and the modern, cutting edge of science, especially in physics, seems to many observers to lend itself to a melding of religious experience and intersubjective verification of beliefs. Some scientists have described religious worldviews—generally of a mystical nature—consistent with their understanding of science:

There are two ways to live your life. One is as though nothing is a miracle. The other is as though everything is a miracle ...

Science without religion is lame, religion without science is blind ...

The religion of the future will be a cosmic religion. The religion which is based on experience, which refuses dogmatism ...

There remains something subtle, intangible and inexplicable. Veneration for this force beyond anything that we can comprehend is my religion. (Albert Einstein)

Other scientists, who are committed to basing belief on intersubjective verification, have called for or predicted the development of a religion consistent with science.

A religion old or new, that stressed the magnificence of the universe as revealed by modern science, might be able to draw forth reserves of reverence and awe hardly tapped by the conventional faiths. Sooner or later, such a religion will emerge. (Carl Sagan, Pale Blue Dot)

The evolutionary epic is probably the best myth we will ever have ... The true evolutionary epic, retold as poetry, is as intrinsically ennobling as any religious epic. (Edward O. Wilson)

Responding to this apparent overlap between cutting edge science and mystical experience, in recent years, there have been overt efforts to formulate religious belief systems that are built on truth claims based upon intersubjective verifiability, e.g. Anthroposophy, Yoism.

== See also ==
- Ineffability
- Objectivity (science)
- Phenomenology
- Replication crisis
- Scientific method

== Notes and references ==
- The Marriage of Sense and Soul: Integrating Science and Religion. Ken Wilber. 1998. Random House (ISBN 0375500545)
