= Bracketing (phenomenology) =

Necessary reductive first step in phenomenology

Bracketing (German: Einklammerung; also called phenomenological reduction, transcendental reduction or phenomenological epoché) means looking at a situation and refraining from judgement and biased opinions to wholly understand an experience. The preliminary step in the philosophical movement of phenomenology is to suspend judgment (i.e., epoché) about the natural world and instead, to focus on analysis of experience. Suspending judgement involves stripping away every connotation and assumption made about an object. Its earliest conception can be traced back to Immanuel Kant who argued that the only reality that one can know is the one each individual experiences in their mind (or Phenomena). Edmund Husserl, building on Kant’s ideas, first proposed bracketing in 1913, to help better understand another’s phenomena.

== Overview ==
=== Immanuel Kant ===
Though it was formally developed by Edmund Husserl (1859–1938), phenomenology can be understood as an outgrowth of the influential ideas of Immanuel Kant (1724–1804). Attempting to resolve some of the key intellectual debates of his era, Kant argued that Noumena (fundamentally unknowable things-in-themselves) must be distinguished from Phenomena (the world as it appears to the mind). Kant, commonly misconceived as arguing that humans cannot have direct access to reality, but only to the contents of their minds, argued rather that what is experienced in the mind is reality to us. Phenomenology grew out of this conception of phenomena and studies the meaning of isolated phenomena as directly connected to our minds. According to The Columbia Encyclopedia, "Modern philosophers have used 'phenomenon' to designate what is apprehended before judgment is applied." This may not be possible if observation is theory-laden.

=== Husserl and Epoché ===
Edmund Husserl included the ideas of Kant in developing his concept of bracketing, also referred to as epoché. Though Husserl likely began developing the method of bracketing around 1906, his book, Ideas, introduced it when it was published in 1913. Husserl reinterpreted and revitalized the epoché of Pyrrhonism as a permanent way of challenging the dogmatic naivete of life in the “natural attitude” and motivating the transformation to theoria, or the theoretical attitude of the disinterested spectator, which is essential both to modern science and to a genuine transcendental philosophy.

Bracketing (or epoché) is a preliminary act in the phenomenological analysis, conceived by Husserl as the suspension of the trust in the objectivity of the world. It involves setting aside the question of the real existence of a contemplated object, as well as all other questions about the object's physical or objective nature; these questions are left to the natural sciences.

For example, the act of seeing a horse qualifies as an experience, whether one sees the horse in person, in a dream, or in a hallucination. 'Bracketing' the horse suspends any judgement about the horse as noumenon, and instead analyses the phenomenon of the horse as constituted in intentional acts.

Bracketing may also be understood in terms of the phenomenological activity. It is supposed to make possible: the "unpacking" of phenomena, or, in other words, systematically peeling away their symbolic meanings like layers of an onion until only the thing itself as meant and experienced remains. Thus, one's subjective intending of the bracketed phenomenon is examined and analyzed in phenomenological purity.

Additionally, Husserl differentiated two types of bracketing which he called universal epoché and local epoché. Universal epoché requires the suspension of assumptions regarding all aspects of existence. Local epoché can be understood as the suspension of assumptions regarding a certain set of particular assumptions, presumably pertaining to whatever is being examined. Husserl viewed universal epoché as stronger than local epoché. To return to the example of the horse, applying local epoché would include suspending all prior assumptions regarding that particular horse, such as its appearance or temperament. Applying universal epoché in this example would likely mean suspending all assumptions regarding all horses or even all animals or all forms of life in general.

== See also ==
- Cartesian doubt
- Epoché
- Eidetic reduction
- Nonviolent communication, a practice which involves avoiding judgements in order to be more aware of feelings and needs
- Theory of justification
