= Experimental phenomenology =

Experimental phenomenology has been defined as the investigation of phenomenological practices and their effects. It has roots in Edmund Husserl's phenomenology.

One of the first phenomenologists to use the term experimental phenomenology was Don Ihde, who explored how intentional variations of experiencing can affect classical perceptual illusions, such as the Necker cube.

Mindfulness meditation represents another kind of phenomenological practice, that also involves an intentional variation of one's experiencing. In this kind of practice, individuals (1) deliberately focus their attention on some aspect of present experience; and (2) do this with a particular kind of attitude (typically described as accepting and non-judgmental, and characterized by openness and curiosity).

Experimental phenomenology has also been applied to the study of contemplative practices and research on spirituality, and to the development of personalized health interventions
