= Ludwig Landgrebe =

Austrian academic

Ludwig Landgrebe (Austrian German: [ˈlandˌɡreːbə]; 9 March 1902 – 14 August 1991) was an Austrian phenomenologist and Professor of philosophy.

He is the grandfather of German actor Max Landgrebe.

== Life ==
Landgrebe was born in Vienna. He studied philosophy, history and geography at the University of Vienna. Influenced by Max Scheler, he continued his studies at the University of Freiburg. In 1923 Landgrebe became assistant to Edmund Husserl. After the approval of his doctoral dissertation, supervised by Husserl, Landgrebe transferred to Prague for his postdoctoral habilitation under Oskar Kraus. From 1939 he collaborated with Eugen Fink at the Husserl Archives in Leuven. Landgrebe's wife, Ilse Maria Goldschmidt, was of Jewish ancestry and sister of the writer Georges-Arthur Goldschmidt. In 1940 Landgrebe was deported to Belgium. He worked part-time as a merchant assistant in Hamburg.

In 1945 Landgrebe had his post-doctorate reapproved in Hamburg, and he was made ordinary professor in 1947 in Kiel, where Hans Blumenberg was one of his students. In 1954 he transferred to Cologne, and become director of the Husserl Archives there. Landgrebe is known as one of Husserl's closest associates, but also for his independent views relating to the subjects of history, religion and politics, as seen from the viewpoints of existentialist philosophy and metaphysics.

He died in Cologne.

== Works ==
- Wilhelm Diltheys Theorie der Geisteswissenschaften, Halle 1928 (Dissertation)
- Nennfunktion und Wortbedeutung. Eine Studie über Martys Sprachphilosophie, Halle 1934
- Was bedeutet uns heute Philosophie, Hamburg 1948 (2. Aufl. 1954)
- Phänomenologie und Metaphysik, Hamburg 1949 (Aufsatzsammlung)
- Philosophie der Gegenwart, Bonn 1952 (2. Aufl. Frankfurt/M 1957)
- Der Weg der Phänomenologie, Gütersloh 1963 (4. Aufl. 1978)
- Phänomenologie und Geschichte, Gütersloh 1968
- Über einige Grundfragen der Philosophie der Politik, Köln/Opladen 1969
- Faktizität und Individuation. Studien zu den Grundfragen der Phänomenologie, Hamburg 1982 (Bibliographie S. 157 - 162)

English translations

- Major Problems in Contemporary European Philosophy, from Dilthey to Heidegger, New York, F. Ungar Pub. Co. 1966 (translation of Philosophie der Gegenwart)
- The Phenomenology of Edmund Husserl. Six Essays edited, with an introduction by Donn Welton Ithaca, Cornell University Press, 1981
