= Jitendra Nath Mohanty =

Indian philosopher (1928–2023)

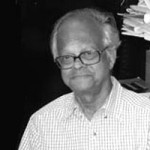
- Born: 1928; Cuttack, Bihar and Orissa Province, British India
- Died: 7 March 2023 (aged 95); Philadelphia, Pennsylvania, U.S.

Jitendra Nath Mohanty (1928 – 7 March 2023) was an Indian philosopher. He served as emeritus professor of philosophy at Temple University.

== Biography ==
Born in Cuttack, in 1928 in Orissa, India, Mohanty had a distinguished career where he stood first in all public examinations and in B.A. Presidency College, Kolkata and M.A. examination at the University of Calcutta. Subsequently, he did a Ph.D. from University of Göttingen in 1954. In his long academic career, he taught at the University of Burdwan, University of Calcutta, New School for Social Research, University of Oklahoma, Emory University, and Temple University and held visiting professorships at many renowned universities.

Mohanty's area of expertise included both Western (particularly German) philosophy and Eastern philosophy (particularly Indian philosophy). He wrote over twenty scholarly books and numerous journal articles on different areas of philosophy including epistemology, logic, and phenomenology. He wrote extensively on Immanuel Kant, founded Husserl Studies, and published a major book on the development of Edmund Husserl’s thought.

Mohanty was also a president of the Indian Philosophical Congress, the Society for Asian and Comparative philosophy. His other honours included a gold medal from the Asiatic Society, Kolkata, and the Humboldt Prize from the German government in honor of his scholarly work. He received an honorary D.Litt. from the University of Calcutta in 2013 and an honorary doctorate from Ravenshaw University in 2017.

Mohanty died in Philadelphia, Pennsylvania on 7 March 2023, at the age of 95.

== Selected bibliography ==
- Lectures on Kant's Critique of Pure Reason by J. N. Mohanty (edited by Tara Chatterjea, Sandhya Basu, and Amita Chatterjee) (Munshiram Manoharlal Publishers Pvt. Ltd., New Delhi, 2014)
- Essays on Consciousness and Interpretation by J. N. Mohanty (edited with an Introduction by Tara Chatterjea) (Oxford University Press, 2009)
- The Philosophy of Edmund Husserl: A Historical Development (Yale Studies in Hermeneutics) (Yale University Press)
- Between Two Worlds: East and West, an Autobiography (Oxford University Press, 2002)
- Classical Indian Philosophy (Oxford University Press, 2002)
- Explorations in Western Philosophy: Essays by J.N. Mohanty Volumes 1 and 2 by J. N. Mohanty and (edited by Bina Gupta) (Oxford University Press, 2001)
- The Self and its Other (Oxford University Press, 2000).
- Logic, Truth, and the Modalities (Kluwer Academic Publishers, 1999).
- The Possibility of Transcendental Philosophy (Martinus Nijoff Publishers, 1985).
- Husserl and Frege (Studies in Phenomenology and Existential Philosophy) (Indiana University Press, 1982).
- Edmund Husserl's Theory of Meaning (Springer, 1976).
- The Concept of Intentionality (Warren H. Green, 1971).
