= Logical Investigations (Husserl) =

Book by Edmund Husserl

- Author: Edmund Husserl
- Language: German
- Subject: Phenomenology
- Published: 1901
- Media type: Print

Logical Investigations (German: Logische Untersuchungen) is a book by the philosopher Edmund Husserl. It is a foundational text in phenomenology. Following Franz Brentano, Husserl described this method as "descriptive psychology". Husserl is concerned with how mathematical knowledge works, and under the influence of Gottlob Frege, renounced his psychologism from the earlier Philosophy of Arithmetic. Husserl's book became the key text of the psychologism dispute. The third Logical Investigation contains the first attempt at a systematic theory of mereology, later pioneered by Stanislaw Lesniewski.
