= Edmund Husserl =

Austrian-German philosopher and mathematician (1859–1938)

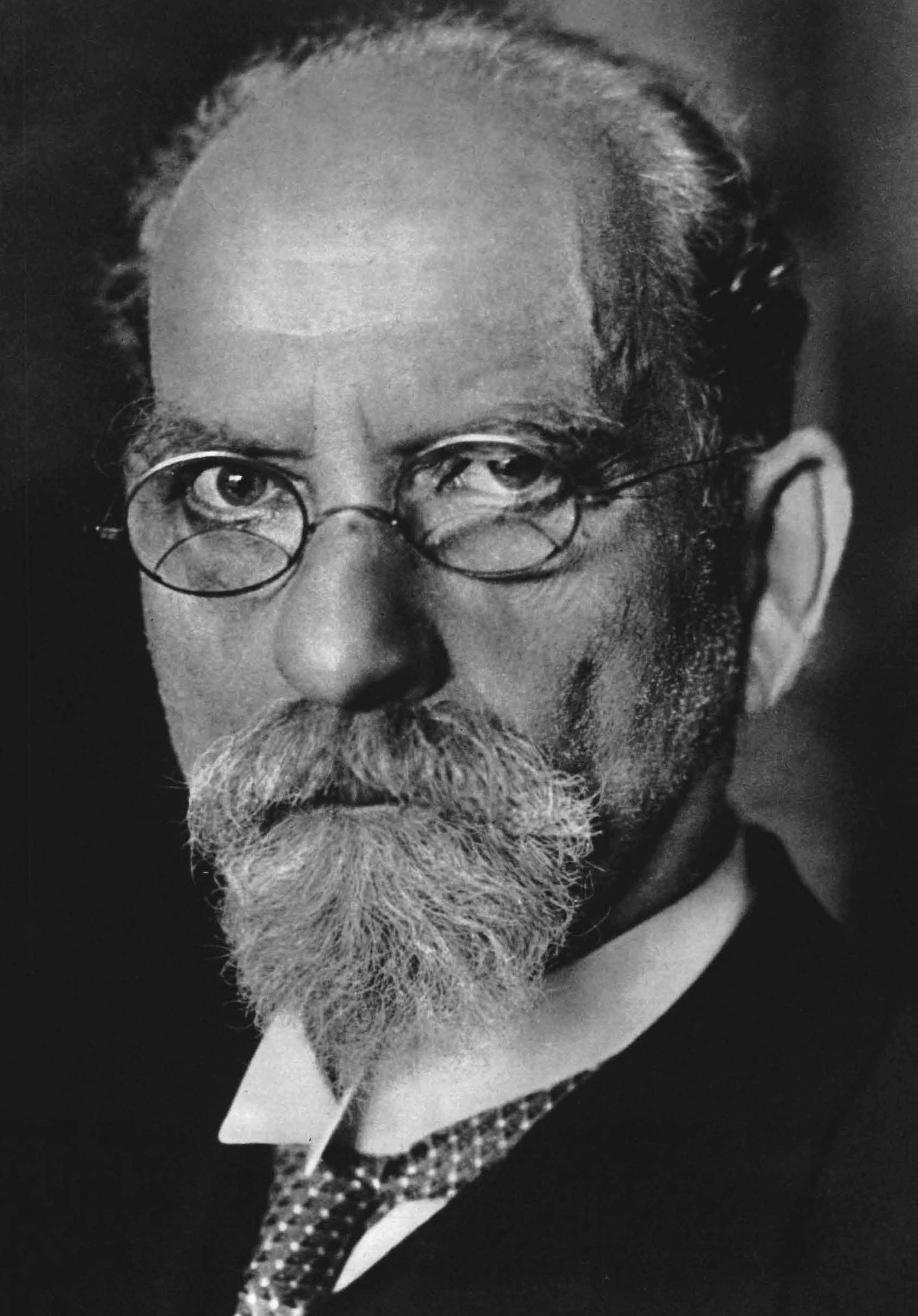
- Husserl, c. 1910s
- Born: Edmund Gustav Albrecht Husserl; 8 April 1859; Proßnitz, Moravia, Austrian Empire
- Died: 27 April 1938 (aged 79); Freiburg, Germany

Education
- Education: Leipzig University; University of Berlin; University of Vienna (PhD, 1883); University of Halle (Dr. phil. hab., 1887)
- Theses: Contributions to the Calculus of Variations (1883); On the Concept of Number (1887)
- Doctoral advisor: Leo Königsberger (PhD advisor); Carl Stumpf (Dr. phil. hab. advisor)
- Other advisors: Franz Brentano; Tomáš Masaryk; Friedrich Paulsen; Karl Weierstrass

Philosophical work
- Era: 20th-century philosophy
- Region: Western philosophy
- School: Continental philosophy; Phenomenology; Other schools: Austrian realism (early); Logical realism (early); Descriptive phenomenology (early); Transcendental constitutive phenomenology (1910s); Genetic phenomenology (1920s–30s); Transcendental idealism (1910s); Foundationalism; Metaphysical conceptualism (1920s); Direct realism; Correspondence theory of truth
- Institutions: University of Halle (1887–1901); University of Göttingen (1901–1916); University of Freiburg (1916–1928)
- Doctoral students: See list: Günther Anders; Winthrop Pickard Bell; Eugen Fink; Dietrich von Hildebrand; Roman Ingarden; Ludwig Landgrebe; Edith Stein
- Notable students: See list: William Ernest Hocking; Alexandre Koyré; Emmanuel Levinas; Jan Patočka; Helmuth Plessner; Hans Reichenbach; Adolf Reinach; Leo Strauss
- Main interests: Epistemology, ontology, philosophy of mathematics, intersubjectivity
- Notable ideas: See list: Phenomenology; Phenomenological reduction (Note: Also 'phenomenological epoché' or 'phenomenological bracketing' or transcendental reduction'.) vs. eidetic reduction; Noesis vs. noema; Formal ontology; Theory of moments; Hyletic data; Lebenswelt; Pre-reflective self-consciousness; Transcendental subjectivism; Criticism of the natural attitude ("physicalist objectivism"); Retention and protention; Nachgewahren; Urdoxa; Phenomenological description; Mereology

Edmund Gustav Albrecht Husserl (Note: /ˈhʊsɜːrl/ HUUSS-url, US also /ˈhʊsərəl/ HUUSS-ər-əl) (Austrian German: [ˈɛdmʊnd ˈhʊsɐl]; 8 April 1859 – 27 April 1938) was an Austrian and German philosopher and mathematician who established the school of phenomenology.

In his early work, he elaborated critiques of historicism and of psychologism in logic based on analyses of intentionality. In his mature work, he sought to develop a systematic foundational science based on the so-called phenomenological reduction. Arguing that transcendental consciousness sets the limits of all possible knowledge, Husserl redefined phenomenology as a transcendental idealist philosophy. Husserl's thought profoundly influenced 20th-century philosophy, and he remains a notable figure in contemporary philosophy and beyond.

Husserl studied mathematics, taught by Karl Weierstrass and Leo Königsberger, and philosophy taught by Franz Brentano and Carl Stumpf. He taught philosophy as a Privatdozent at Halle from 1887, then as professor, first at Göttingen from 1901, then at Freiburg from 1916 until he retired in 1928, after which he remained highly productive. In 1933, under racial laws of the Nazi Party, Husserl was banned from using the library of the University of Freiburg due to his Jewish family background and months later resigned from the Deutsche Akademie. Following an illness, he died in Freiburg in 1938.

== Biography ==
=== Youth and education ===
Husserl was born in 1859 in Proßnitz in the Margraviate of Moravia in the Austrian Empire (today Prostějov in the Czech Republic). He was born into a Jewish family, the second of four children. His father was a milliner. His childhood was spent in Prostějov, where he attended the secular primary school. Then Husserl traveled to Vienna to study at the Realgymnasium there, followed next by the Staatsgymnasium in Olmütz.

At the University of Leipzig from 1876 to 1878, Husserl studied mathematics, physics, and astronomy. At Leipzig, he was inspired by philosophy lectures given by Wilhelm Wundt, one of the founders of modern psychology. Then he moved to the Frederick William University of Berlin (the present-day Humboldt University of Berlin) in 1878, where he continued his study of mathematics under Leopold Kronecker and Karl Weierstrass. In Berlin, he found a mentor in Tomáš Garrigue Masaryk (then a former philosophy student of Franz Brentano and later the first president of Czechoslovakia) and attended Friedrich Paulsen's philosophy lectures. In 1881, he left for the University of Vienna to complete his mathematics studies under the supervision of Leo Königsberger (a former student of Weierstrass). At Vienna in 1883, he obtained his PhD with the work Beiträge zur Variationsrechnung (Contributions to the Calculus of variations).

Evidently, as a result of his becoming familiar with the New Testament during his twenties, Husserl asked to be baptized into the Lutheran Church in 1886. Husserl's father, Adolf, had died in 1884. Herbert Spiegelberg writes, "While outward religious practice never entered his life any more than it did that of most academic scholars of the time, his mind remained open for the religious phenomenon as for any other genuine experience." At times Husserl saw his goal as one of moral "renewal". Although a steadfast proponent of a radical and rational autonomy in all things, Husserl could also speak "about his vocation and even about his mission under God's will to find new ways for philosophy and science," observes Spiegelberg.

Following his PhD in mathematics, Husserl returned to Berlin to work as the assistant to Karl Weierstrass. Yet already Husserl had felt the desire to pursue philosophy. Then Weierstrass became very ill. Husserl became free to return to Vienna, where, after serving a short military duty, he devoted his attention to philosophy. In 1884, at the University of Vienna he attended the lectures of Franz Brentano on philosophy and philosophical psychology. Brentano introduced him to the writings of Bernard Bolzano, Hermann Lotze, J. Stuart Mill, and David Hume. Husserl was so impressed by Brentano that he decided to dedicate his life to philosophy; indeed, Franz Brentano is often credited as being his most important influence, e.g., with regard to intentionality. Following academic advice, two years later in 1886 Husserl followed Carl Stumpf, a former student of Brentano, to the University of Halle, seeking to obtain his habilitation which would qualify him to teach at the university level. There, under Stumpf's supervision, he wrote his habilitation thesis, Über den Begriff der Zahl (On the Concept of Number), in 1887, which would serve later as the basis for his first important work, Philosophie der Arithmetik (1891).

In 1887, Husserl married Malvine Steinschneider, a union that would last over fifty years. In 1892, their daughter Elizabeth was born, in 1893 their son Gerhart, and in 1894 their son Wolfgang. Elizabeth would marry in 1922, and Gerhart in 1923; Wolfgang, however, became a casualty of the First World War. Gerhart would become a philosopher of law, contributing to the subject of comparative law, teaching in the United States and after the war in Austria.

=== Professor of philosophy ===
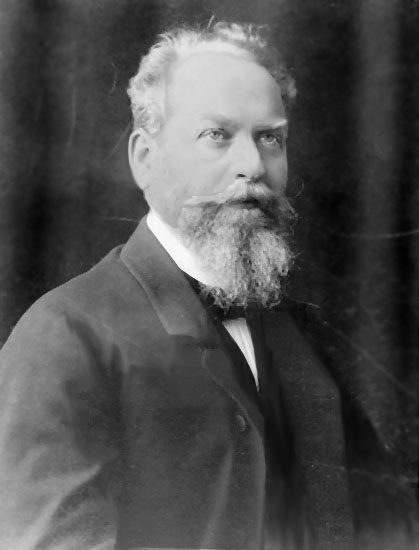
Edmund Husserl c. 1900

Following his marriage, Husserl began his long teaching career in philosophy. He started in 1887 as a Privatdozent at the University of Halle. In 1891, he published his Philosophie der Arithmetik. Psychologische und logische Untersuchungen which, drawing on his prior studies in mathematics and philosophy, proposed a psychological context as the basis of mathematics. It drew the adverse notice of Gottlob Frege, who criticized its psychologism.

In 1901, Husserl, with his family, moved to the University of Göttingen, where he taught as extraordinarius professor. Just prior to this, a major work of his, Logische Untersuchungen (Halle, 1900–1901), was published. Volume One contains seasoned reflections on "pure logic" in which he carefully refutes "psychologism". This work was well received and became the subject of a seminar given by Wilhelm Dilthey; Husserl in 1905 traveled to Berlin to visit Dilthey. Two years later, in Italy, he paid a visit to Franz Brentano, his inspiring old teacher, and to the mathematician Constantin Carathéodory. Kant and Descartes were also now influencing his thought. In 1910, he became joint editor of the journal Logos. During this period, Husserl had delivered lectures on internal time consciousness, which several decades later his former students Edith Stein and Martin Heidegger edited for publication.

In 1912, in Freiburg, the journal Jahrbuch für Philosophie und Phänomenologische Forschung ("Yearbook for Philosophy and Phenomenological Research") was founded by Husserl and his school, which published articles of their phenomenological movement from 1913 to 1930. His important work Ideen was published in its first issue (Vol. 1, Issue 1, 1913). Before beginning Ideen, Husserl's thought had reached the stage where "each subject is 'presented' to itself, and to each all others are 'presentiated' (Vergegenwärtigung), not as parts of nature but as pure consciousness". Ideen advanced his transition to a "transcendental interpretation" of phenomenology, a view later criticized by, among others, Jean-Paul Sartre. In Ideen Paul Ricœur sees the development of Husserl's thought as leading "from the psychological cogito to the transcendental cogito". As phenomenology further evolves, it leads (when viewed from another vantage point in Husserl's 'labyrinth') to "transcendental subjectivity". Also in Ideen Husserl explicitly elaborates the phenomenological and eidetic reductions. Ivan Ilyin and Karl Jaspers visited Husserl at Göttingen.

In October 1914, both his sons were sent to fight on the Western Front of World War I, and the following year, one of them, Wolfgang Husserl, was badly injured. On 8 March 1916, on the battlefield of Verdun, Wolfgang was killed in action. The next year, his other son, Gerhart Husserl was wounded in the war but survived. His own mother, Julia, died. In November 1917, one of his outstanding students and later a noted philosophy professor in his own right, Adolf Reinach, was killed in the war while serving in Flanders.

Husserl had transferred in 1916 to the University of Freiburg (in Freiburg im Breisgau) where he continued bringing his work in philosophy to fruition, now as a full professor. Edith Stein served as his personal assistant during his first few years in Freiburg, followed later by Martin Heidegger from 1920 to 1923. The mathematician Hermann Weyl began corresponding with him in 1918. Husserl gave four lectures on the phenomenological method at University College London in 1922. The University of Berlin in 1923 called on him to relocate there, but he declined the offer. In 1926, Heidegger dedicated his book Sein und Zeit (Being and Time) to him "in grateful respect and friendship." Husserl remained in his professorship at Freiburg until he requested retirement, teaching his last class on 25 July 1928. A Festschrift to celebrate his seventieth birthday was presented to him on 8 April 1929.

Despite retirement, Husserl gave several notable lectures. The first, at Paris in 1929, led to Méditations cartésiennes (Paris 1931). Husserl here reviews the phenomenological epoché (or phenomenological reduction), presented earlier in his pivotal Ideen (1913), in terms of a further reduction of experience to what he calls a 'sphere of ownness.' From within this sphere, which Husserl enacts to show the impossibility of solipsism, the transcendental ego finds itself always already paired with the lived body of another ego, another monad. This 'a priori' interconnection of bodies, given in perception, is what founds the interconnection of consciousnesses known as transcendental intersubjectivity, which Husserl would go on to describe at length in volumes of unpublished writings. There has been a debate over whether or not Husserl's description of ownness and its movement into intersubjectivity is sufficient to reject the charge of solipsism, to which Descartes, for example, was subject. One argument against Husserl's description works this way: instead of infinity and the Deity being the ego's gateway to the Other, as in Descartes, Husserl's ego in the Cartesian Meditations itself becomes transcendent. It remains, however, alone (unconnected). Only the ego's grasp "by analogy" of the Other (e.g., by conjectural reciprocity) allows the possibility for an 'objective' intersubjectivity, and hence for community.

In 1933, the racial laws of the new National Socialist German Workers Party were enacted. On 6 April Husserl was banned from using the library at the University of Freiburg, or any other academic library; the following week, after a public outcry, he was reinstated. Yet his colleague Heidegger was elected Rector of the university on 21–22 April, and joined the Nazi Party. By contrast, in July Husserl resigned from the Deutsche Akademie.

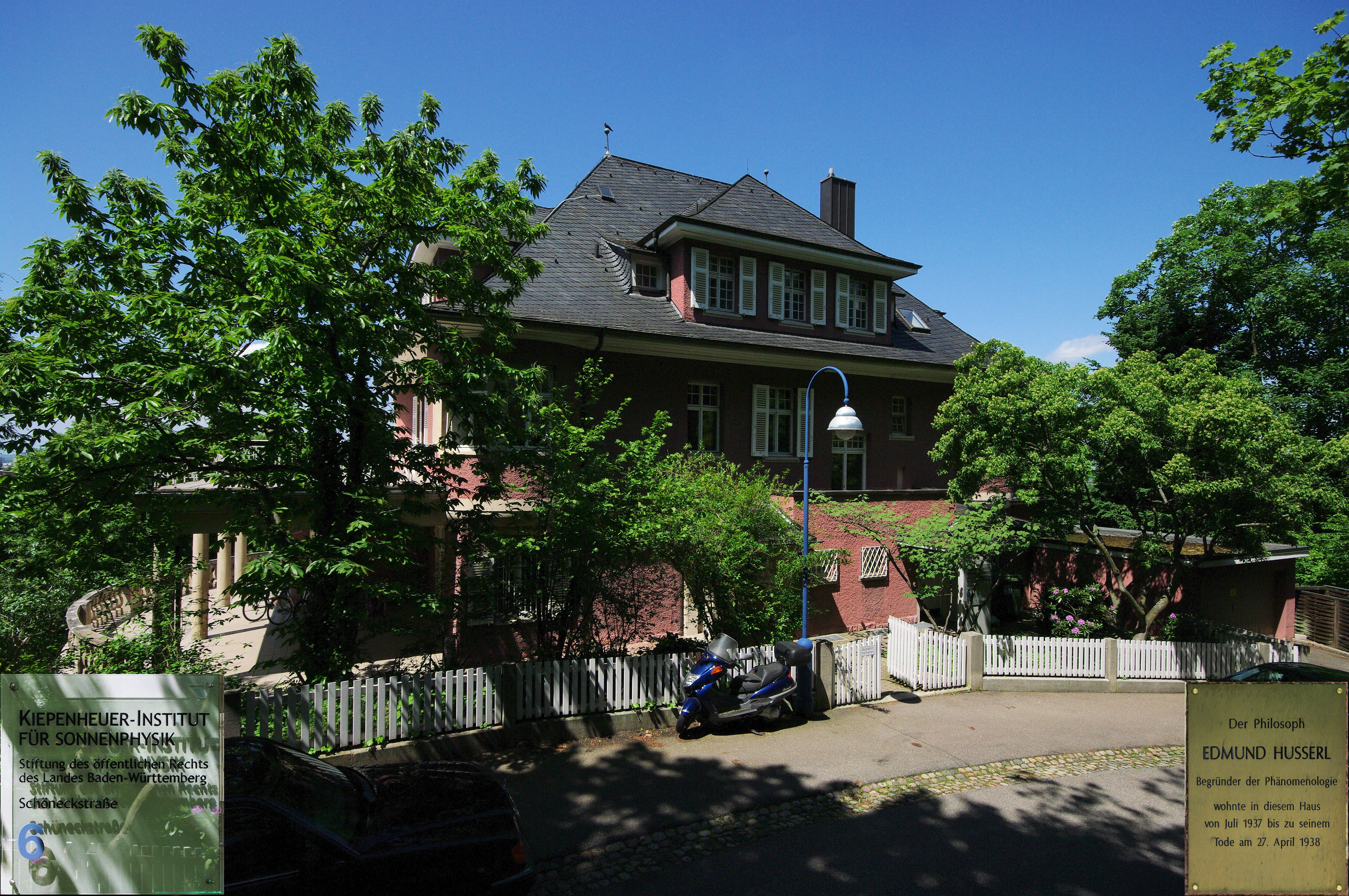
The Kiepenheuer Institute for Solar Physics in Freiburg, Husserl's home 1937–1938

Later, Husserl lectured at Prague in 1935 and Vienna in 1936, which resulted in a very differently styled work that, while innovative, is no less problematic: Die Krisis (Belgrade 1936). Husserl describes here the cultural crisis gripping Europe, then approaches a philosophy of history, discussing Galileo, Descartes, several British philosophers, and Kant. The apolitical Husserl before had specifically avoided such historical discussions, pointedly preferring to go directly to an investigation of consciousness. Merleau-Ponty and others question whether Husserl here does not undercut his own position, in that Husserl had attacked in principle historicism, while specifically designing his phenomenology to be rigorous enough to transcend the limits of history. On the contrary, Husserl may be indicating here that historical traditions are merely features given to the pure ego's intuition, like any other. A longer section follows on the "lifeworld" [Lebenswelt], one not observed by the objective logic of science, but a world seen through subjective experience. Yet a problem arises similar to that dealing with 'history' above, a chicken-and-egg problem. Does the lifeworld contextualize and thus compromise the gaze of the pure ego, or does the phenomenological method nonetheless raise the ego up transcendent? These last writings presented the fruits of his professional life. Since his university retirement, Husserl had "worked at a tremendous pace, producing several major works."

After suffering a fall in the autumn of 1937, the philosopher became ill with pleurisy. Edmund Husserl died in Freiburg on 27 April 1938, having just turned 79. His wife, Malvine, survived him. Eugen Fink, his research assistant, delivered his eulogy. Gerhard Ritter was the only Freiburg faculty member to attend the funeral, as an anti-Nazi protest.

=== Heidegger and the Nazi era ===
Husserl was rumoured to have been denied the use of the library at Freiburg as a result of the anti-Jewish legislation of April 1933. Relatedly, among other disabilities, Husserl was unable to publish his works in Nazi Germany [see above footnote to Die Krisis (1936)]. It was also rumoured that his former pupil Martin Heidegger informed Husserl that he was discharged, but it was actually the previous rector. Apparently, Husserl and Heidegger had moved apart during the 1920s, which became clearer after 1928 when Husserl retired and Heidegger succeeded to his university chair. In the summer of 1929 Husserl had studied carefully selected writings of Heidegger, coming to the conclusion that on several of their key positions they differed: e.g., Heidegger substituted Dasein ["Being-there"] for the pure ego, thus transforming phenomenology into an anthropology, a type of psychologism strongly disfavored by Husserl. Such observations of Heidegger, along with a critique of Max Scheler, were put into a lecture Husserl gave to various Kant Societies in Frankfurt, Berlin, and Halle during 1931 entitled Phänomenologie und Anthropologie.

In the wartime 1941 edition of Heidegger's primary work, Being and Time (Sein und Zeit, first published in 1927), the original dedication to Husserl was removed. This was not due to a negation of the relationship between the two philosophers, however, but rather was the result of a suggested censorship by Heidegger's publisher who feared that the book might otherwise be banned by the Nazi regime. The dedication can still be found in a footnote on page 38, thanking Husserl for his guidance and generosity. Husserl had died three years earlier. In post-war editions of Sein und Zeit the dedication to Husserl is restored. The complex, troubled, and sundered philosophical relationship between Husserl and Heidegger has been widely discussed. (Note: Husserl is mentioned by Bernard Stiegler in the 2004 film The Ister.)

On 4 May 1933, Professor Edmund Husserl addressed the recent regime change in Germany and its consequences:

The future alone will judge which was the true Germany in 1933, and who were the true Germans—those who subscribe to the more or less materialistic-mythical racial prejudices of the day, or those Germans pure in heart and mind, heirs to the great Germans of the past whose tradition they revere and perpetuate.

=== Death ===
After his death, Husserl's manuscripts, amounting to approximately 40,000 pages of "Gabelsberger" stenography and his complete research library, were in 1939 smuggled to the Catholic University of Leuven in Belgium by the Franciscan priest Herman Van Breda. There they were deposited at Leuven to form the Husserl-Archives of the Higher Institute of Philosophy. Much of the material in his research manuscripts has since been published in the Husserliana critical edition series.

== Philosophy ==
Husserl's thought is revolutionary in several ways, most notably in the distinction between "natural" and "phenomenological" modes of understanding. In the former, sense-perception in correspondence with the material realm constitutes the known reality, and understanding is premised on the accuracy of the perception and the objective knowability of what is called the "real world". Phenomenological understanding strives to be rigorously "presuppositionless" by means of what Husserl calls "phenomenological reduction". This reduction is not conditioned but rather transcendental: in Husserl's terms, pure consciousness of absolute Being. In Husserl's work, consciousness of any given thing calls for discerning its meaning as an "intentional object". Such an object does not simply strike the senses, to be interpreted or misinterpreted by mental reason; it has already been selected and grasped, grasping being an etymological connotation, of percipere, the root of "perceive".

=== Early themes ===
In his first works, Husserl combined mathematics, psychology, and philosophy with the goal of providing a sound foundation for mathematics. He analyzed the psychological process needed to obtain the concept of number and then built up a theory on this analysis. He used methods and concepts taken from his teachers. From Weierstrass, he derived the idea of generating the concept of number by counting a certain collection of objects. From Brentano and Stumpf, he took the distinction between proper and improper presenting. In an example, Husserl explained this in the following way: if someone is standing in front of a house, they have a proper, direct presentation of that house, but if they are looking for it and ask for directions, then these directions (e.g. the house on the corner of this and that street) are an indirect, improper presentation. In other words, the person can have a proper presentation of an object if it is actually present, and an improper (or symbolic, as Husserl also calls it) one if they only can indicate that object through signs, symbols, etc. Husserl's Logical Investigations (1900–1901) is considered the first attempt at formal theory of wholes and their parts known as mereology, later pioneered by Stanisław Leśniewski.

Another important element that Husserl took over from Brentano was intentionality, the notion that the main characteristic of consciousness is that it is always intentional. While often simplistically summarised as "aboutness" or the relationship between mental acts and the external world, Brentano defined it as the main characteristic of mental phenomena, by which they could be distinguished from physical phenomena. Every mental phenomenon, every psychological act, has a content, is directed at an object (the intentional object). Every belief, desire, etc. has an object that it is about: the believed, the wanted. Brentano used the expression "intentional inexistence" to indicate the status of the objects of thought in the mind. The property of being intentional, of having an intentional object, was the key feature to distinguish mental phenomena and physical phenomena, because physical phenomena lack intentionality altogether.

=== The elaboration of phenomenology ===
Some years after the 1900–1901 publication of his main work, the Logische Untersuchungen (Logical Investigations), Husserl made some key conceptual elaborations which led him to assert that to study the structure of consciousness, one would have to distinguish between the act of consciousness and the phenomena at which it is directed (the objects as intended). Knowledge of essences would only be possible by "bracketing" all assumptions about the existence of an external world. This procedure he called "epoché". These new concepts prompted the publication of the Ideen (Ideas) in 1913, in which they were at first incorporated, and a plan for a second edition of the Logische Untersuchungen.

From the Ideen onward, Husserl concentrated on the ideal, essential structures of consciousness. The metaphysical problem of establishing the reality of what people perceive, as distinct from the perceiving subject, was of little interest to Husserl in spite of his being a transcendental idealist. Husserl proposed that the world of objects—and of ways in which people direct themselves toward and perceive those objects—is normally conceived of in what he called the "natural attitude", which is characterized by a belief that objects exist distinct from the perceiving subject and exhibit properties that people see as emanating from them (this attitude is also called physicalist objectivism). Husserl proposed a radical new phenomenological way of looking at objects by examining how people, in their many ways of being intentionally directed toward them, actually "constitute" them (to be distinguished from materially creating objects or objects merely being figments of the imagination); in the Phenomenological standpoint, the object ceases to be something simply "external" and ceases to be seen as providing indicators about what it is, and becomes a grouping of perceptual and functional aspects that imply one another under the idea of a particular object or "type". The notion of objects as real is not expelled by phenomenology, but "bracketed" as a way in which people regard objects—instead of a feature that inheres in an object's essence, founded in the relation between the object and the perceiver. To better understand the world of appearances and objects, phenomenology attempts to identify the invariant features of how objects are perceived and pushes attributions of reality into their role as an attribution about the things people perceive (or an assumption underlying how people perceive objects). The major dividing line in Husserl's thought is the turn to transcendental idealism.

In a later period, Husserl began to wrestle with the complicated issues of intersubjectivity, specifically, how communication about an object can be assumed to refer to the same ideal entity (Cartesian Meditations, Meditation V). Husserl tries new methods of bringing his readers to understand the importance of phenomenology to scientific inquiry (and specifically to psychology) and what it means to "bracket" the natural attitude. The Crisis of the European Sciences is Husserl's unfinished work that deals most directly with these issues. In it, Husserl for the first time attempts a historical overview of the development of Western philosophy and science, emphasizing the challenges presented by their increasingly one-sided empirical and naturalistic orientation. Husserl declares that mental and spiritual reality possess their own reality independent of any physical basis, and that a science of the mind ('Geisteswissenschaft') must be established on as scientific a foundation as the natural sciences have managed: "It is my conviction that intentional phenomenology has for the first time made spirit as spirit the field of systematic scientific experience, thus effecting a total transformation of the task of knowledge."

=== Meaning and object ===
From Logical Investigations (1900/1901) to Experience and Judgment (published in 1939), Husserl expressed clearly the difference between meaning and object. He identified several different kinds of names. For example, there are names that have the role of properties that uniquely identify an object. Each of these names expresses a meaning and designates the same object. Examples of this are "the victor in Jena" and "the loser in Waterloo", or "the equilateral triangle" and "the equiangular triangle"; in both cases, both names express different meanings, but designate the same object. There are names which have no meaning, but have the role of designating an object: "Aristotle", "Socrates", and so on. Finally, there are names which designate a variety of objects. These are called "universal names"; their meaning is a "concept" and refers to a series of objects (the extension of the concept). The way people know sensible objects is called "sensible intuition".

Husserl also identifies a series of "formal words" which are necessary to form sentences and have no sensible correlates. Examples of formal words are "a", "the", "more than", "over", "under", "two", "group", and so on. Every sentence must contain formal words to designate what Husserl calls "formal categories". There are two kinds of categories: meaning categories and formal-ontological categories. Meaning categories relate judgments; they include forms of conjunction, disjunction, forms of plural, among others. Formal-ontological categories relate objects and include notions such as set, cardinal number, ordinal number, part and whole, relation, and so on. The way people know these categories is through a faculty of understanding called "categorial intuition".

Through sensible intuition, consciousness constitutes what Husserl calls a "situation of affairs" (Sachlage). It is a passive constitution where objects themselves are presented. To this situation of affairs, through categorial intuition, people are able to constitute a "state of affairs" (Sachverhalt). One situation of affairs, through objective acts of consciousness (acts of constituting categorially) can serve as the basis for constituting multiple states of affairs. For example, suppose a and b are two sensible objects in a certain situation of affairs. It can be used as the basis to say, "a<b" and "b>a", two judgments which designate the same state of affairs. For Husserl, a sentence has a proposition or judgment as its meaning, and refers to a state of affairs which has a situation of affairs as a reference base.

=== Formal and regional ontology ===
Husserl sees ontology as a science of essences. Sciences of essences are contrasted with factual sciences: the former are knowable a priori and provide the foundation for the later, which are knowable a posteriori. Ontology as a science of essences is not interested in actual facts, but in the essences themselves, whether they have instances or not. Husserl distinguishes between formal ontology, which investigates the essence of objectivity in general, and regional ontologies, which study regional essences that are shared by all entities belonging to the region. Regions correspond to the highest genera of concrete entities: material nature, personal consciousness, and interpersonal spirit. Husserl's method for studying ontology and sciences of essence in general is called eidetic variation. It involves imagining an object of the kind under investigation and varying its features. The changed feature is inessential to this kind if the object can survive its change; otherwise, it belongs to the kind's essence. For example, a triangle remains a triangle if one of its sides is extended, but it ceases to be a triangle if a fourth side is added. Regional ontology involves applying this method to the essences corresponding to the highest genera.

=== Philosophy of logic and mathematics ===
Husserl believed that truth-in-itself has as ontological correlate being-in-itself, just as meaning categories have formal-ontological categories as correlates. Logic is a formal theory of judgment, that studies the formal a priori relations among judgments using meaning categories. Mathematics, on the other hand, is formal ontology; it studies all the possible forms of being (of objects). Hence, for both logic and mathematics, the different formal categories are the objects of study, not the sensible objects themselves. The problem with the psychological approach to mathematics and logic is that it fails to account for the fact that this approach is about formal categories, and not simply about abstractions from sensibility alone. The reason why sensible objects are not dealt with in mathematics is because of another faculty of understanding called "categorial abstraction." Through this faculty, people are able to get rid of sensible components of judgments, and just focus on formal categories themselves.

Thanks to "eidetic reduction" (or "essential intuition"), people are able to grasp the possibility, impossibility, necessity, and contingency among concepts and among formal categories. Categorial intuition, categorial abstraction and eidetic reduction are the basis for logical and mathematical knowledge.

Husserl criticized the logicians of his day for not focusing on the relation between subjective processes that offer objective knowledge of pure logic. All subjective activities of consciousness need an ideal correlate, and objective logic (constituted noematically), as it is constituted by consciousness, needs a noetic correlate (the subjective activities of consciousness).

Husserl stated that logic has three strata, each further away from consciousness and psychology than those that precede it.

- The first stratum is what Husserl called a "morphology of meanings" concerning a priori ways to relate judgments to make them meaningful. In this stratum, people elaborate a "pure grammar" or a logical syntax, and he would call its rules "laws to prevent non-sense", which would be similar to what logic calls today "formation rules". Mathematics, as logic's ontological correlate, also has a similar stratum, a "morphology of formal-ontological categories".
- The second stratum would be called by Husserl "logic of consequence" or the "logic of non-contradiction" which explores all possible forms of true judgments. He includes here syllogistic classic logic, propositional logic, and that of predicates. This is a semantic stratum, and the rules of this stratum would be the "laws to avoid counter-sense" or "laws to prevent contradiction". They are very similar to today's logic "transformation rules". Mathematics also has a similar stratum which is based, among others, on the pure theory of pluralities and a pure theory of numbers. They provide a science of the conditions of possibility of any theory whatsoever. Husserl also talked about what he called "logic of truth," which consists of the formal laws of possible truth and its modalities, and precedes the third logical stratum.
- The third stratum is metalogical, what he called a "theory of all possible forms of theories." It explores all possible theories in an a priori fashion, rather than the possibility of theory in general. Theories of possible relations between pure forms of theories could be established; these logical relations could, in turn, be investigated using deduction. The logician is free to see the extension of this deductive, theoretical sphere of pure logic.

The ontological correlate to the third stratum is the "theory of manifolds". In formal ontology, it is a free investigation where a mathematician can assign several meanings to several symbols, and all their possible valid deductions in a general and indeterminate manner. It is, properly speaking, the most universal mathematics of all. Through the positing of certain indeterminate objects (formal-ontological categories) as well as any combination of mathematical axioms, mathematicians can explore the apodeictic connections between them, as long as consistency is preserved.

According to Husserl, this view of logic and mathematics accounted for the objectivity of a series of mathematical developments of his time, such as n-dimensional manifolds (both Euclidean and non-Euclidean), Hermann Grassmann's theory of extensions, William Rowan Hamilton's Hamiltonians, Sophus Lie's theory of transformation groups, and Cantor's set theory.

Jacob Klein was one student of Husserl who pursued this line of inquiry, seeking to "desedimentize" mathematics and the mathematical sciences.

=== Philosophy of Arithmetic and Frege ===
After obtaining his PhD in mathematics, Husserl began analyzing the foundations of mathematics from a psychological point of view. In his On the Concept of Number (1887) and in his Philosophy of Arithmetic (1891), Husserl sought, by employing Brentano's descriptive psychology, to define the natural numbers in a way that advanced the methods and techniques of Karl Weierstrass, Richard Dedekind, Georg Cantor, Gottlob Frege, and other contemporary mathematicians. Later, in the first volume of his Logical Investigations, the Prolegomena of Pure Logic, Husserl, while attacking the psychologistic point of view in logic and mathematics, also appears to reject much of his early work, although the forms of psychologism analysed and refuted in the Prolegomena did not apply directly to his Philosophy of Arithmetic. Some scholars question whether Frege's negative review of the Philosophy of Arithmetic helped turn Husserl towards modern Platonism, but he had already discovered the work of Bernard Bolzano independently around 1890/91. In his Logical Investigations, Husserl explicitly mentioned Bolzano, G. W. Leibniz and Hermann Lotze as inspirations for his newer position.

Husserl's review of Ernst Schröder, published before Frege's landmark 1892 article, clearly distinguishes sense from reference; thus, Husserl's notions of noema and object also arose independently. Likewise, in his criticism of Frege in the Philosophy of Arithmetic, Husserl remarks on the distinction between the content and the extension of a concept. Moreover, the distinction between the subjective mental act, namely the content of a concept, and the (external) object, was developed independently by Brentano and his school, and may have surfaced as early as Brentano's 1870s lectures on logic.

Scholars such as J. N. Mohanty, Claire Ortiz Hill, and Guillermo E. Rosado Haddock, among others, have argued that Husserl's so-called change from psychologism to Platonism came about independently of Frege's review. For example, the review falsely accuses Husserl of subjectivizing everything, so that no objectivity is possible, and falsely attributes to him a notion of abstraction whereby objects disappear until all that remains are numbers as mere ghosts. Contrary to what Frege states, in Husserl's Philosophy of Arithmetic, there are already two different kinds of representations: subjective and objective. Moreover, objectivity is clearly defined in that work. Frege's attack seems to be directed at certain foundational doctrines then current in Weierstrass's Berlin School, of which Husserl and Cantor cannot be said to be orthodox representatives.

Furthermore, various sources indicate that Husserl changed his mind about psychologism as early as 1890, a year before he published the Philosophy of Arithmetic. Husserl stated that by the time he published that book, he had already changed his mind—that he had doubts about psychologism from the very outset. He attributed this change of mind to his reading of Leibniz, Bolzano, Lotze, and David Hume. Husserl makes no mention of Frege as a decisive factor in this change. In his Logical Investigations, Husserl mentions Frege only twice, once in a footnote to point out that he had retracted three pages of his criticism of Frege's The Foundations of Arithmetic, and again to question Frege's use of the word Bedeutung to designate "reference" rather than "meaning" (sense).

In a letter dated 24 May 1891, Frege thanked Husserl for sending him a copy of the Philosophy of Arithmetic and Husserl's review of Ernst Schröder's Vorlesungen über die Algebra der Logik. In the same letter, Frege used the review of Schröder's book to analyze Husserl's notion of the sense of reference of concept words. Hence Frege recognized, as early as 1891, that Husserl distinguished between sense and reference. Consequently, Frege and Husserl independently elaborated a theory of sense and reference before 1891.

Commentators argue that Husserl's notion of noema has nothing to do with Frege's notion of sense, because noemata are necessarily fused with noeses, which are the conscious activities of consciousness. Noemata have three different levels:

- The substratum, which is never presented to consciousness, and is the support of all the properties of the object;
- The noematic senses, which are the different ways the objects are presented to us;
- The modalities of being (possible, doubtful, existent, non-existent, absurd, and so on).

Consequently, in intentional activities, even non-existent objects can be constituted, and form part of the whole noema. Frege, however, did not conceive of objects as forming parts of senses: If a proper name denotes a non-existent object, it does not have a reference; hence, concepts with no objects have no truth value in arguments. Moreover, Husserl did not maintain that predicates of sentences designate concepts. According to Frege, the reference of a sentence is a truth value; for Husserl, it is a "state of affairs." Frege's notion of "sense" is unrelated to Husserl's noema, while the latter's notions of "meaning" and "object" differ from those of Frege.

In detail, Husserl's conception of logic and mathematics differs from that of Frege, who held that arithmetic could be derived from logic. For Husserl, this is not the case: mathematics (with the exception of geometry) is the ontological correlate of logic, and while both fields are related, neither one is strictly reducible to the other.

=== Husserl's criticism of psychologism ===
Reacting against authors such as John Stuart Mill, Christoph von Sigwart and his own former teacher Brentano, Husserl criticised their psychologism in mathematics and logic, i.e. their conception of these abstract and a priori sciences as having an essentially empirical foundation and a prescriptive or descriptive nature. According to psychologism, logic would not be an autonomous discipline, but a branch of psychology, either proposing a prescriptive and practical "art" of correct judgement (as Brentano and some of his more orthodox students did) or a description of the factual processes of human thought. Husserl pointed out that the failure of anti-psychologists to defeat psychologism was a result of being unable to distinguish between the foundational, theoretical side of logic, and the applied, practical side. Pure logic does not deal at all with "thoughts" or "judgings" as mental episodes but with a priori laws and conditions for any theory and any judgments whatsoever, conceived as propositions in themselves.

"Here 'Judgement' has the same meaning as 'proposition', understood, not as a grammatical, but as an ideal unity of meaning. This is the case with all the distinctions of acts or forms of judgement, which provide the foundations for the laws of pure logic. Categorial, hypothetical, disjunctive, existential judgements, and however else we may call them, in pure logic are not names for classes of judgements, but for ideal forms of propositions."

Since "truth-in-itself" has "being-in-itself" as ontological correlate, and since psychologists reduce truth (and hence logic) to empirical psychology, the inevitable consequence is scepticism. Psychologists have not been successful either in showing how induction or psychological processes can justify the absolute certainty of logical principles, such as the principles of identity and non-contradiction. It is therefore futile to base certain logical laws and principles on uncertain processes of the mind.

This confusion made by psychologism (and related disciplines such as biologism and anthropologism) can be due to three specific prejudices:

1. The first prejudice is the supposition that logic is somehow normative in nature. Husserl argues that logic is theoretical, i.e., that logic itself proposes a priori laws which are themselves the basis of the normative side of logic. Since mathematics is related to logic, he cites an example from mathematics: a formula like "(a + b)(a – b) = a² – b²" does not offer any insight into how to think mathematically. It just expresses a truth. A proposition that says: "The product of the sum and the difference of a and b should give the difference of the squares of a and b" does express a normative proposition, but this normative statement is based on the theoretical statement "(a + b)(a – b) = a² – b²".
2. For psychologists, the acts of judging, reasoning, deriving, and so on, are all psychological processes. Therefore, it is the role of psychology to provide the foundation of these processes. Husserl states that this effort made by psychologists is a "metábasis eis állo génos" (Ancient Greek: μετάβασις εἰς ἄλλο γένος, lit. 'a transgression to another field'). It is a metábasis because psychology cannot provide any foundations for a priori laws which themselves are the basis for all correct thought. Psychologists have the problem of confusing intentional activities with the object of these activities. It is important to distinguish between the act of judging and the judgment itself, the act of counting and the number itself, and so on. Counting five objects is undeniably a psychological process, but the number 5 is not.
3. Judgments can be true or not true. Psychologists argue that judgments are true because they become "evidently" true to us. This evidence, a psychological process that "guarantees" truth, is indeed a psychological process. Husserl responds by saying that truth itself, as well as logical laws, always remain valid regardless of psychological "evidence" that they are true. No psychological process can explain the a priori objectivity of these logical truths.

From this criticism of psychologism, the distinction between psychological acts and their intentional objects, and the difference between the normative side of logic and the theoretical side, derive from a Platonist conception of logic. This means that logical and mathematical laws should be regarded as being independent of the human mind, and also as an autonomy of meanings. It is essentially the difference between the real (everything subject to time) and the ideal or irreal (everything that is atemporal), such as logical truths, mathematical entities, mathematical truths, and meanings in general.

== Legacy ==
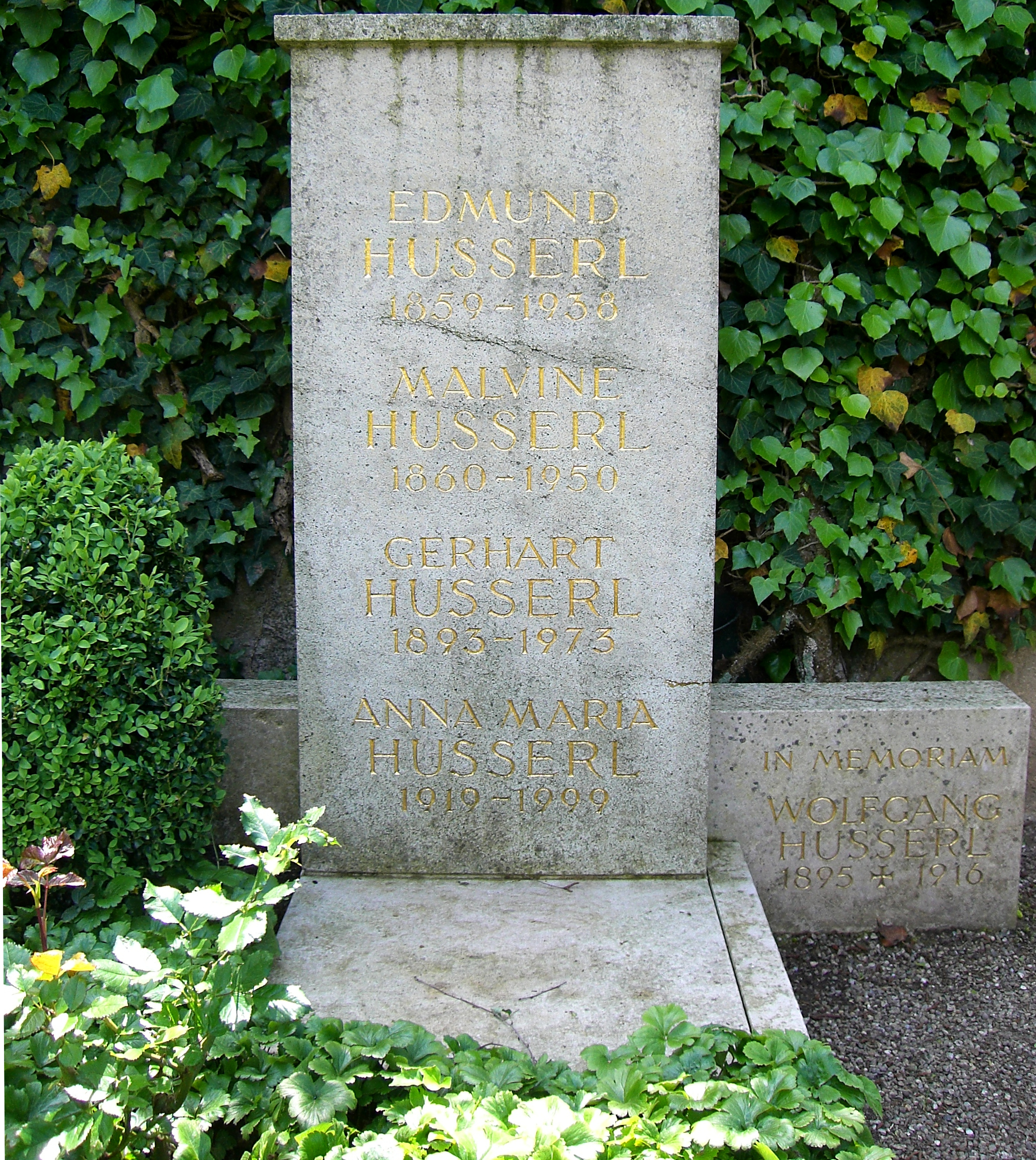
Husserl's gravestone at Günterstal

David Carr commented on Husserl following in his 1970 dissertation at Yale: "It is well known that Husserl was always disappointed at the tendency of his students to go their own way, to embark upon fundamental revisions of phenomenology rather than engage in the communal task" as originally intended by the radical new science. Notwithstanding, he did attract philosophers to phenomenology.

Martin Heidegger is the best known of Husserl's students, the one whom Husserl chose as his successor at Freiburg. Heidegger's magnum opus Being and Time was dedicated to Husserl. They shared their thoughts and worked alongside each other for over a decade at the University of Freiburg, Heidegger being Husserl's assistant during 1920–1923. Heidegger's early work followed his teacher, but with time he began to develop new insights distinctively variant. Husserl became increasingly critical of Heidegger's work, especially in 1929, and included pointed criticism of Heidegger in lectures he gave during 1931. Heidegger, while acknowledging his debt to Husserl, followed a political position offensive and harmful to Husserl after the Nazis came to power in 1933, Husserl being of Jewish origin and Heidegger infamously being then a Nazi proponent. Academic discussion of Husserl and Heidegger is extensive.

At Göttingen in 1913, Adolf Reinach "was now Husserl's right hand. He was above all the mediator between Husserl and the students, for he understood extremely well how to deal with other persons, whereas Husserl was pretty much helpless in this respect." He was an original editor of Husserl's new journal, Jahrbuch; one of his works (giving a phenomenological analysis of the law of obligations) appeared in its first issue. Reinach was widely admired and a remarkable teacher. Husserl, in his 1917 obituary, wrote, "He wanted to draw only from the deepest sources, he wanted to produce only work of enduring value. And through his wise restraint, he succeeded in this."

Edith Stein was Husserl's student at Göttingen and Freiburg while she wrote her doctoral thesis The Empathy Problem as it Developed Historically and Considered Phenomenologically (1916). She then became his assistant at Freiburg in 1916–18. She later adapted her phenomenology to the modern school of modern Thomism.

Ludwig Landgrebe became assistant to Husserl in 1923. From 1939, he collaborated with Eugen Fink at the Husserl-Archives in Leuven. In 1954, he became the leader of the Husserl-Archives. Landgrebe is known as one of Husserl's closest associates, but also for his independent views relating to history, religion, and politics as seen from the viewpoints of existentialist philosophy and metaphysics.

Eugen Fink was a close associate of Husserl during the 1920s and 1930s. He wrote the Sixth Cartesian Meditation which Husserl said was the truest expression and continuation of his own work. Fink delivered the eulogy for Husserl in 1938.

Roman Ingarden, an early student of Husserl at Freiburg, corresponded with Husserl into the mid-1930s. Ingarden did not accept, however, the later transcendental idealism of Husserl which he thought would lead to relativism. Ingarden has written his work in German and Polish. In his Spór o istnienie świata (Ger.: "Der Streit um die Existenz der Welt", Eng.: "Dispute about existence of the world"), he created his own realistic position, which also helped to spread phenomenology in Poland.

Max Scheler met Husserl in Halle in 1901 and found in his phenomenology a methodological breakthrough for his own philosophy. Scheler, who was at Göttingen when Husserl taught there, was one of the original few editors of the journal Jahrbuch für Philosophie und Phänomenologische Forschung (1913). Scheler's work Formalism in Ethics and Nonformal Ethics of Value appeared in the new journal (1913 and 1916) and drew acclaim. The personal relationship between the two men, however, became strained due to Scheler's legal troubles, and Scheler returned to Munich. Although Scheler later criticised Husserl's idealistic logical approach and proposed a "phenomenology of love" instead, he states that he remained "deeply indebted" to Husserl throughout his work.

Nicolai Hartmann was once thought to be at the center of phenomenology, but perhaps no longer. In 1921, the prestige of Hartmann, the neo-Kantian, who was Professor of Philosophy at the University of Marburg, was added to the Movement; he "publicly declared his solidarity with the actual work of die Phänomenologie." Yet Hartmann's connections were with Max Scheler and the Munich circle; Husserl himself evidently did not consider him a phenomenologist. His philosophy, however, is said to include an innovative use of the method.

Emmanuel Levinas in 1929 gave a presentation at one of Husserl's last seminars in Freiburg. Also that year, he wrote a long review of Husserl's Ideen (1913) published by a French journal. With Gabrielle Peiffer, Levinas translated into French Husserl's Méditations cartésiennes (1931). He was at first impressed with Heidegger and began a book on him, but broke off the project when Heidegger became involved with the Nazis. After the war he wrote on Jewish spirituality; most of his family had been murdered by the Nazis in Lithuania. Levinas then began to write works that would become widely known and admired.

Alfred Schutz's Phenomenology of the Social World seeks to rigorously ground Max Weber's interpretive sociology in Husserl's phenomenology. Husserl was impressed by this work and asked Schutz to be his assistant.

Jean-Paul Sartre was also largely influenced by Husserl, although he later came to disagree with key points in his analyses. Sartre rejected Husserl's transcendental interpretations begun in his Ideen (1913) and instead followed Heidegger's ontology.

Maurice Merleau-Ponty's Phenomenology of Perception is influenced by Edmund Husserl's work on perception, intersubjectivity, intentionality, space, and temporality, including Husserl's theory of retention and protention. Merleau-Ponty's description of 'motor intentionality' and sexuality, for example, retains the important structure of the noetic/noematic correlation of Ideen I, yet further concretizes what it means for Husserl when consciousness particularizes itself into modes of intuition. Merleau-Ponty's most clearly Husserlian work is, perhaps, "the Philosopher and His Shadow." Depending on the interpretation of Husserl's accounts of eidetic intuition, given in Husserl's Phenomenological Psychology and Experience and Judgment, it may be that Merleau-Ponty did not accept the "eidetic reduction" nor the "pure essence" said to result. Merleau-Ponty was the first student to study at the Husserl-archives in Leuven.

Gabriel Marcel explicitly rejected existentialism, due to Sartre, but not phenomenology, which has enjoyed a wide following among French Catholics. He appreciated Husserl, Scheler, and (but with apprehension) Heidegger. His expressions like "ontology of sensability" when referring to the body, indicate influence by phenomenological thought.

Kurt Gödel is known to have read Cartesian Meditations. He expressed very strong appreciation for Husserl's work, especially with regard to "bracketing" or "epoché".

Hermann Weyl's interest in intuitionistic logic and impredicativity appears to have resulted from his reading of Husserl. He was introduced to Husserl's work through his wife, Helene Joseph, herself a student of Husserl at Göttingen.

Colin Wilson has used Husserl's ideas extensively in developing his "New Existentialism," particularly in regards to his "intentionality of consciousness," which he mentions in a number of his books.

Rudolf Carnap was also influenced by Husserl, not only concerning Husserl's notion of essential insight that Carnap used in his Der Raum, but also his notion of "formation rules" and "transformation rules" is founded on Husserl's philosophy of logic.

Karol Wojtyla, who would later become Pope John Paul II, was influenced by Husserl. Phenomenology appears in his major work, The Acting Person (1969). Originally published in Polish, it was translated by Andrzej Potocki and edited by Anna-Teresa Tymieniecka in the Analecta Husserliana. The Acting Person combines phenomenological work with Thomistic ethics.

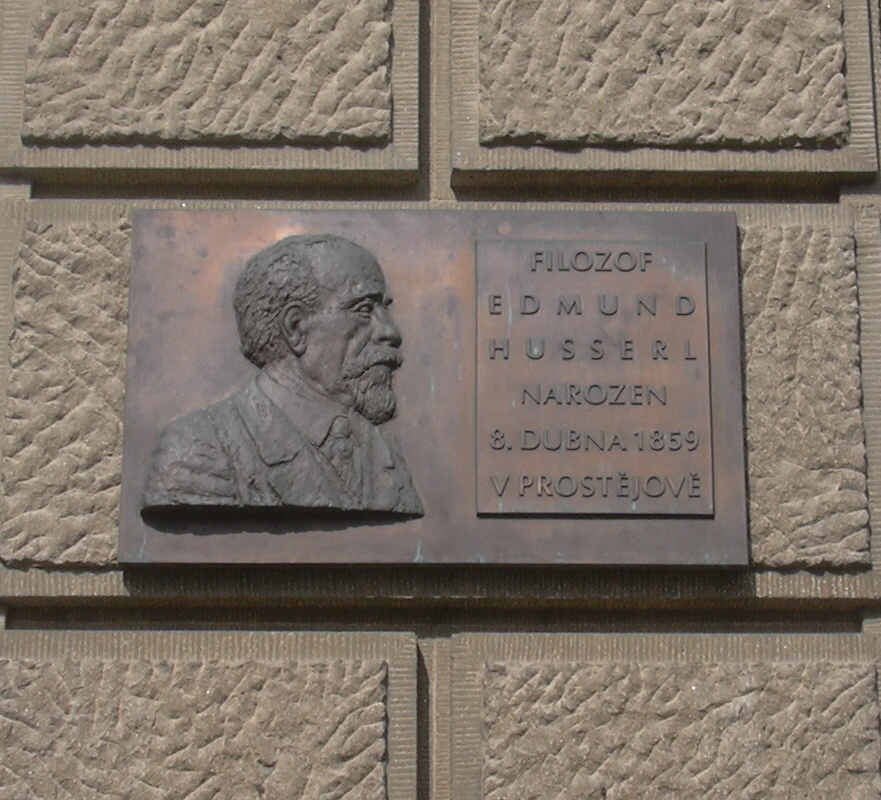
Plaque commemorating Husserl in his home town of Prostějov, Czech Republic

Paul Ricœur has translated many works of Husserl into French and has also written many of his own studies of the philosopher. Among other works, Ricœur employed phenomenology in his Freud and Philosophy (1965).

Jacques Derrida wrote several critical studies of Husserl early in his academic career. These included his dissertation, The Problem of Genesis in Husserl's Philosophy, and also his introduction to The Origin of Geometry. Derrida continued to make reference to Husserl in works such as Of Grammatology.

Stanisław Leśniewski and Kazimierz Ajdukiewicz were inspired by Husserl's formal analysis of language. Accordingly, they employed phenomenology in the development of categorial grammar.

José Ortega y Gasset visited Husserl at Freiburg in 1934. He credited phenomenology for having 'liberated him' from a narrow neo-Kantian thought. While perhaps not a phenomenologist himself, he introduced the philosophy to Iberia and Latin America.

Wilfrid Sellars, an influential figure in the so-called "Pittsburgh School" (Robert Brandom, John McDowell) had been a student of Marvin Farber, a pupil of Husserl, and was influenced by phenomenology through him:

Marvin Farber led me through my first careful reading of the Critique of Pure Reason and introduced me to Husserl. His combination of utter respect for the structure of Husserl's thought with the equally firm conviction that this structure could be given a naturalistic interpretation was undoubtedly a key influence on my own subsequent philosophical strategy.

In his 1942 essay The Myth of Sisyphus, absurdist philosopher Albert Camus acknowledges Husserl as a previous philosopher who described and attempted to deal with the feeling of the absurd, but claims he committed "philosophical suicide" by elevating reason and ultimately arriving at ubiquitous Platonic forms and an abstract god.

Hans Blumenberg received his habilitation in 1950, with a dissertation on ontological distance, an inquiry into the crisis of Husserl's phenomenology.

The influence of the Husserlian phenomenological tradition in the 21st century extends beyond the confines of the European and North American legacies. It has already started to impact (indirectly) scholarship in Eastern and Oriental thought, including research on the impetus of philosophical thinking in the history of ideas in Islam.

== Works ==
=== In German ===
- 1887. Über den Begriff der Zahl. Psychologische Analysen (On the Concept of Number; habilitation thesis)
- 1891. Philosophie der Arithmetik. Psychologische und logische Untersuchungen (Philosophy of Arithmetic)
- 1900. Logische Untersuchungen. Erster Teil: Prolegomena zur reinen Logik (Logical Investigations, Vol. 1: Prolegomena to Pure Logic)
- 1901. Logische Untersuchungen. Zweiter Teil: Untersuchungen zur Phänomenologie und Theorie der Erkenntnis (Logical Investigations, Vol. 2)
- 1911. Philosophie als strenge Wissenschaft (included in Phenomenology and the Crisis of Philosophy: Philosophy as Rigorous Science and Philosophy and the Crisis of European Man)
- 1913. Ideen zu einer reinen Phänomenologie und phänomenologischen Philosophie. Erstes Buch: Allgemeine Einführung in die reine Phänomenologie (Ideas: General Introduction to Pure Phenomenology)
- 1923–24. Erste Philosophie. Zweiter Teil: Theorie der phänomenologischen Reduktion (First Philosophy, Vol. 2: Phenomenological Reductions)
- 1925. Erste Philosophie. Erster Teil: Kritische Ideengeschichte (First Philosophy, Vol. 1: Critical History of Ideas)
- 1928. Vorlesungen zur Phänomenologie des inneren Zeitbewusstseins (Lectures on the Phenomenology of the Consciousness of Internal Time)
- 1929. Formale und transzendentale Logik. Versuch einer Kritik der logischen Vernunft (Formal and Transcendental Logic)
- 1930. Nachwort zu meinen "Ideen zu einer reinen Phänomenologie und phänomenologischen Philosophie" (Postscript to my "Ideas")
- 1936. Die Krisis der europäischen Wissenschaften und die transzendentale Phänomenologie: Eine Einleitung in die phänomenologische Philosophie (The Crisis of European Sciences and Transcendental Phenomenology: An Introduction to Phenomenological Philosophy)
- 1939. Erfahrung und Urteil. Untersuchungen zur Genealogie der Logik. (Experience and Judgment)
- 1950. Cartesianische Meditationen (translation of Méditations cartésiennes (Cartesian Meditations, 1931))
- 1952. Ideen II: Phänomenologische Untersuchungen zur Konstitution (Ideas II: Studies in the Phenomenology of Constitution)
- 1952. Ideen III: Die Phänomenologie und die Fundamente der Wissenschaften (Ideas III: Phenomenology and the Foundations of the Sciences)
- 1973. Zur Phänomenologie der Intersubjektivität (On the Phenomenology of Intersubjectivity)

=== In English ===
- Philosophy of Arithmetic, Willard, Dallas, trans., 2003 [1891]. Dordrecht: Kluwer.
- Logical Investigations, 1973 [1900, 2nd revised edition 1913], Findlay, J. N., trans. London: Routledge.
- "Philosophy as Rigorous Science", translated in Quentin Lauer, S.J., editor, 1965 [1910] Phenomenology and the Crisis of Philosophy. New York: Harper & Row.
- Ideas Pertaining to a Pure Phenomenology and to a Phenomenological Philosophy – First Book: General Introduction to a Pure Phenomenology, 1982 [1913]. Kersten, F., trans. The Hague: Nijhoff.
- Ideas Pertaining to a Pure Phenomenology and to a Phenomenological Philosophy – Second Book: Studies in the Phenomenology of Constitution, 1989. R. Rojcewicz and A. Schuwer, translators. Dordrecht: Kluwer.
- Ideas Pertaining to a Pure Phenomenology and to a Phenomenological Philosophy – Third Book: Phenomenology and the Foundations of the Sciences, 1980, Klein, T. E., and Pohl, W. E., translators. Dordrecht: Kluwer.
- On the Phenomenology of the Consciousness of Internal Time (1893–1917), 1990 [1928]. Brough, J.B., trans. Dordrecht: Kluwer.
- Cartesian Meditations, 1960 [1931]. Cairns, D., trans. Dordrecht: Kluwer.
- Formal and Transcendental Logic, 1969 [1929], Cairns, D., trans. The Hague: Nijhoff.
- Experience and Judgement, 1973 [1939], Churchill, J. S., and Ameriks, K., translators. London: Routledge.
- The Crisis of European Sciences and Transcendental Phenomenology, 1970 [1936/54], Carr, D., trans. Evanston: Northwestern University Press.
- "Universal Teleology". Telos 4 (Fall 1969). New York: Telos Press.

=== Anthologies ===
- Willard, Dallas, trans., 1994. Early Writings in the Philosophy of Logic and Mathematics. Dordrecht: Kluwer.
- Welton, Donn, ed., 1999. The Essential Husserl. Bloomington: Indiana University Press.

== See also ==
- Early phenomenology
- Experimental phenomenology
- List of phenomenologists
