= Gerhart Husserl =

German legal scholar and philosopher

Gerhart Adolf Husserl (December 22, 1893 – September 9, 1973, Freiburg im Breisgau) was a German legal scholar and philosopher. He was the eldest son of philosopher Edmund Husserl (1859–1938).

Born in Halle, Saxony, in 1893. He was on active duty during the Great war, and suffered a serious wound in 1917 and again in 1918, losing the sight of his left eye. Gerhart Husserl nonetheless managed to finish his University studies and habilitated in 1924. In two years, on 18 November 1926 he became a Professor of Law at the University of Kiel. He was dismissed due to the Law for the Restoration of the Professional Civil Service in 1933, and eventually emigrated to the United States. In the USA, he taught at the University of Washington from 1940 to 1948. In 1954 he was appointed honorary professor of Comparative law and Anglo-American law by the Freiburg Law Faculty. His research interests were centered around phenomenology of law.
