= Eidetic reduction =

Method of determining the essences of a mental object

Eidetic reduction is a technique in the study of essences in Edmund Husserl's phenomenology whose goal is to identify the basic components of phenomena. Eidetic reduction requires that a phenomenologist examine the essence of a mental object, be it a simple mental act, or the unity of consciousness itself, with the intention of drawing out the absolutely necessary and invariable components that make the mental object what it is. This is achieved by the method known as eidetic variation. It involves imagining an object of the kind under investigation and varying its features. The changed feature is inessential to this kind if the object can survive its change, otherwise it belongs to the kind's essence.

== Overview ==
One can take for example Descartes's piece of wax (not as a mental object, but as a demonstration of the concept of reduction). It appears to be opaque, flat, hard, extended to certain dimensions in space. It has a certain feel, smell, taste. Most of these qualities can be negated as necessary to the piece of wax continuing to be a piece of wax; the smell, taste, texture, opacity. If heated, it will continue to be the same piece of wax, the same molecules. However, the taste may change, the smell may become more noticeable, the texture will obviously change, it will become clear if heated to the point of melting, etc. The only things that remain (its extension into space, chemical makeup, and mass) are the things that are required for the existence of that piece of wax.

Eidetic reduction is a form of imaginative variation by which one attempts to reduce a phenomenon into its necessary essences. This is done by theoretically changing different elements (while mentally observing whether or not the phenomenon changes) of a practical object to learn which characteristics are necessary for it to be it without being something else. If a characteristic is changed, and the object remains unchanged, the characteristic is unnecessary to the essence of the object, and vice versa.

The basic steps of an eidetic reduction are threefold: first, choose some specific example (e.g., Descartes's wax). Then, vary the example imaginatively. The third step involves figuring out that which cannot be eliminated while the example remains itself. That which cannot be eliminated is part of the example's essence. For example, a triangle remains a triangle if one of its sides is extended but it ceases to be a triangle if a fourth side is added. This shows that having three sides is essential to being a triangle, while having a specific side length is not.

== See also ==
- Epistemology
- Phenomenological reduction
