= Theodor Elsenhans =

German psychologist and neo-Kantian philosopher (1862-1918)

Theodor Elsenhans (German: [ˈɛlzənhans]; 7 March 1862 – 3 January 1918) was a German psychologist and neo-Kantian philosopher. He was born in Stuttgart and died in Dresden.

== Life ==
Elsenhans started studying theology at the University of Tübingen, but became interested in philosophy. He received his doctorate in 1885. In 1902 he completed his Habilitationsschrift at Heidelberg University, with a monograph on Kant and the post-Kantian Jakob Friedrich Fries. In 1908 he took up a professorship at Dresden University, where he continued to work on epistemology.

== Works ==
- Psychologie und Logik zur Einführung in die Philosophie: für Oberklassen höherer Schulen und zum Selbststudium[Psychology and logic as an introduction to philosophy: for upper secondary school classes and for self-study], 1890
- Wesen und Entstehung des Gewissens: Eine Psychologie der Ethik [The nature and origin of conscience: a psyschology of ethics], 1894.
- Das Kant-Friesische Problem [The Kant-Fries problem], 1902.
- Lehrbuch der psychologie [Handbook of psychology], 1912
