= Phenomenology (philosophy) =

Philosophical method and schools of philosophy

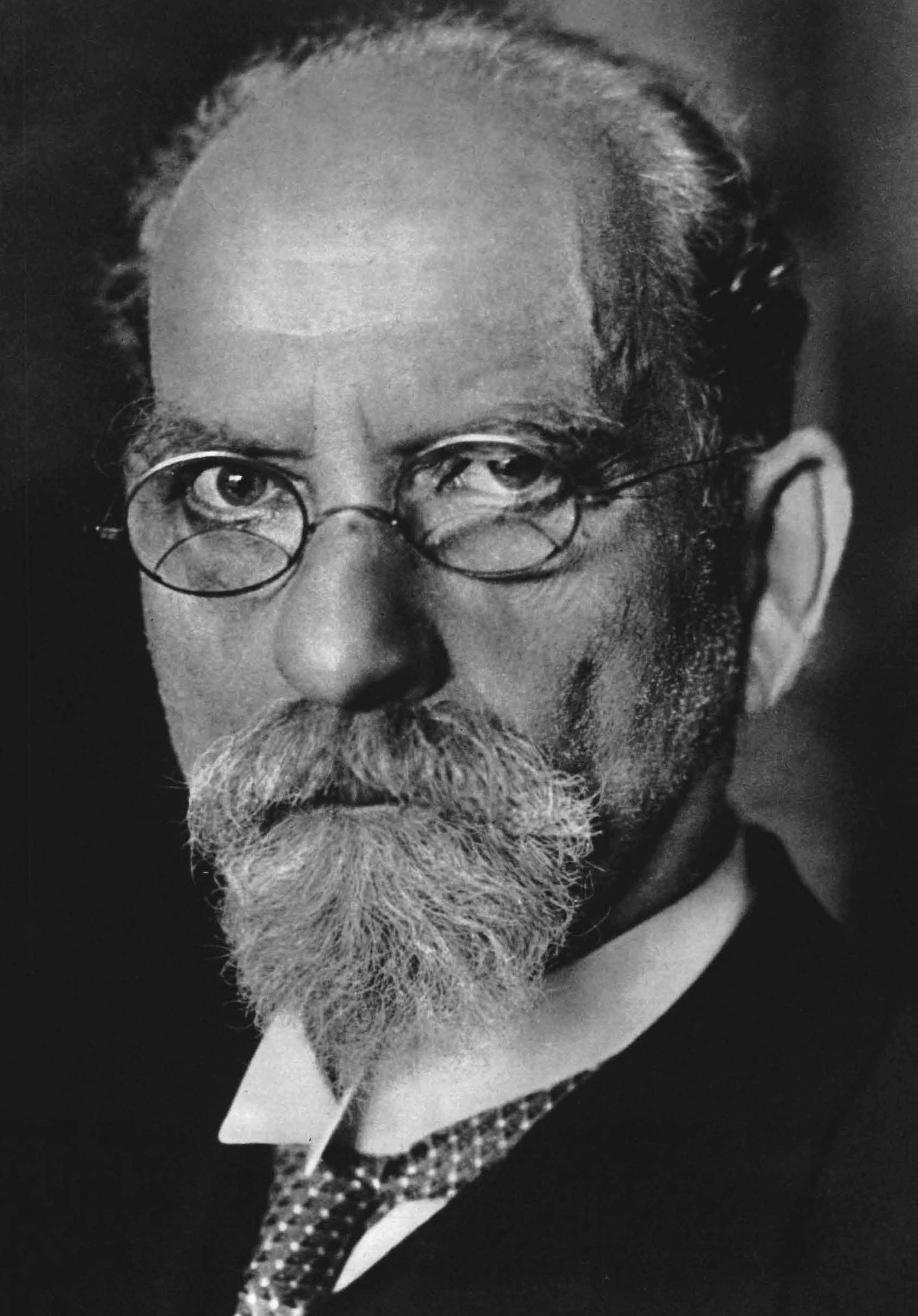
Edmund Husserl

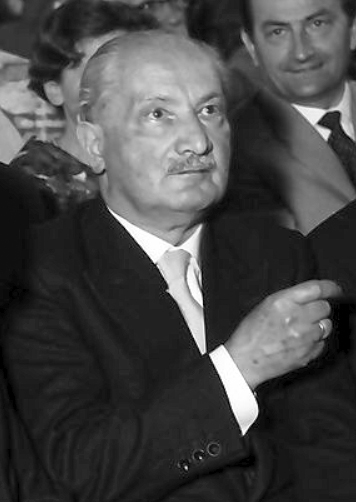
Martin Heidegger

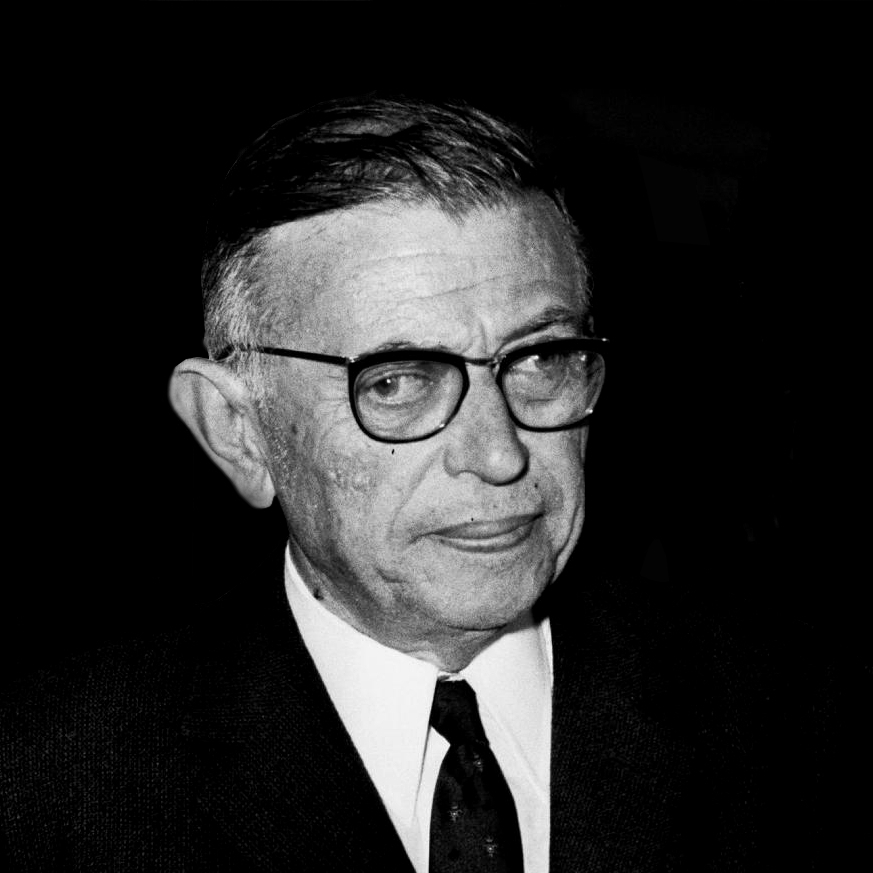
Jean-Paul Sartre

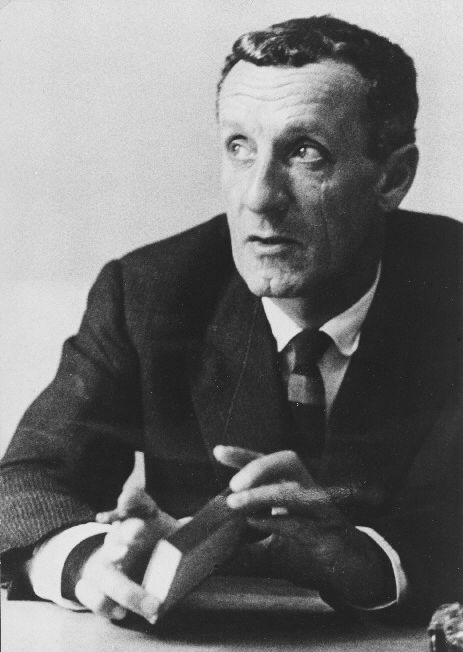
Maurice Merleau-Ponty

Phenomenology is a philosophical study and movement largely associated with the early 20th century that seeks to objectively investigate the nature of subjective, conscious experience. It attempts to describe the universal features of consciousness while avoiding assumptions about the external world, aiming to describe phenomena as they appear, and to explore the meaning and significance of lived experience.

This approach, while philosophical, has found many applications in qualitative research across different scientific disciplines, especially in the social sciences, humanities, psychology, and cognitive science, but also in fields as diverse as health sciences, architecture, and human-computer interaction, among many others. The application of phenomenology in these fields aims to gain a deeper understanding of subjective experience, rather than focusing on behavior.

Phenomenology is contrasted with phenomenalism, which reduces mental states and physical objects to complexes of sensations, and with psychologism, which treats logical truths or epistemological principles as the products of human psychology. In particular, transcendental phenomenology, as outlined by Edmund Husserl, aims to arrive at an objective understanding of the world via the discovery of universal logical structures in human subjective experience.

There are important differences in the ways that different branches of phenomenology approach subjectivity. For example, according to Martin Heidegger, truths are contextually situated and dependent on the historical, cultural, and social context in which they emerge. Other types include hermeneutic, genetic, and embodied phenomenology. All these different branches of phenomenology may be seen as representing different philosophies despite sharing the common foundational approach of phenomenological inquiry; that is, investigating things just as they appear, independent of any particular theoretical framework.

== Etymology ==
The term phenomenology derives from the Greek φαινόμενον, phainómenon ("that which appears") and λόγος, lógos ("study"). It entered the English language around the turn of the 18th century and first appeared in direct connection to Husserl's philosophy in a 1907 article in The Philosophical Review.

In philosophy, "phenomenology" refers to the tradition inaugurated by Edmund Husserl at the beginning of the 20th century. The term, however, had been used in different senses in other philosophy texts since the 18th century. These include those by Johann Heinrich Lambert (1728–1777), Immanuel Kant (1724–1804), G. W. F. Hegel (1770–1831), and Carl Stumpf (1848–1936), among others.

It was, however, the usage of Franz Brentano (and, as he later acknowledged, Ernst Mach) that would prove definitive for Husserl. From Brentano, Husserl took the conviction that philosophy must commit itself to description of what is "given in direct 'self-evidence'."

Central to Brentano's phenomenological project was his theory of intentionality, which he developed from his reading of Aristotle's On the Soul. According to the phenomenological tradition, "the central structure of an experience is its intentionality, it being directed towards something, as it is an experience of or about some object." Also, on this theory, every intentional act is implicitly accompanied by a secondary, pre-reflective awareness of the act as one's own.

== Overview ==
Phenomenology proceeds systematically, but it does not attempt to study consciousness from the perspective of clinical psychology or neurology. Instead, it seeks to determine the essential properties and structures of experience. Phenomenology is not a matter of individual introspection: a subjective account of experience, which is the topic of psychology, must be distinguished from an account of subjective experience, which is the topic of phenomenology. Its topic is not "mental states", but "worldly things considered in a certain way".

Phenomenology is a direct reaction to the psychologism and physicalism of Husserl's time. It takes as its point of departure the question of how objectivity is possible at all when the experience of the world and its objects is thoroughly subjective.

So far from being a form of subjectivism, phenomenologists argue that the scientific ideal of a purely objective third-person is a fantasy and falsity. The perspective and presuppositions of the scientist must be articulated and taken into account in the design of the experiment and the interpretation of its results. In as much as phenomenology is able to accomplish this, it can help to improve the quality of empirical scientific research.

Notwithstanding of the field's internal diversity, Shaun Gallagher and Dan Zahavi argue that the phenomenological method is composed of four basic steps:

1. In Husserl's usage, epoché denotes the procedure by which the phenomenologist endeavors to suspend commonsense and theoretical assumptions about reality (what he terms the natural attitude) in order to attend only to what is directly given in experience. This is not a philosophically skeptical move; reality is never in doubt. The purpose is to see it more closely to how it truly is. The underlying insight is that objects are "experienced and disclosed in the ways they are, thanks to the way consciousness is structured."
2. The phenomenological reduction is closely linked to the epoché. The aim of the reduction is to analyze the correlations between what is given in experience and specific structures of subjectivity shaping and enabling this givenness. This "leads back" (Latin: re-ducere) to the world.
3. Eidetic variation is the process of imaginatively stripping away the properties of things to determine what is essential to them, that is, what are the characteristics without which a thing would not be the thing that it is (eidos is Plato's Greek word for the essence of a thing). Significantly for the phenomenological researcher, eidetic variation can be practiced on acts of consciousness themselves to help clarify, for instance, the structure of perception or memory. Husserl openly acknowledges that the essences uncovered by this method include various degrees of vagueness and also that such analyses are defeasible. He contends, however, that this does not undermine the value of the method.
4. Intersubjective corroboration is simply the sharing of one's results with the larger research community. This allows for comparisons that help to sort out what is idiosyncratic to the individual from what might be essential to the structure of experience as such.

According to phenomenologist Maurice Natanson, "The radicality of the phenomenological method is both continuous and discontinuous with philosophy's general effort to subject experience to fundamental, critical scrutiny: to take nothing for granted and to show the warranty for what we claim to know." Husserl says that the suspension of belief in what is ordinarily taken for granted or inferred by conjecture diminishes the power of what is customarily embraced as objective reality. In the words of philosopher Rüdiger Safranski, "[Husserl and his followers'] great ambition was to disregard anything that had until then been thought or said about consciousness or the world [while] on the lookout for a new way of letting the things [they investigated] approach them, without covering them up with what they already knew."

== History ==
Edmund Husserl "set the phenomenological agenda" even for exponents who did not strictly adhere to his teachings, including Martin Heidegger, Jean-Paul Sartre, and Maurice Merleau-Ponty. Each thinker has "different conceptions of phenomenology, different methods, and different results."

=== Husserl's conceptions ===
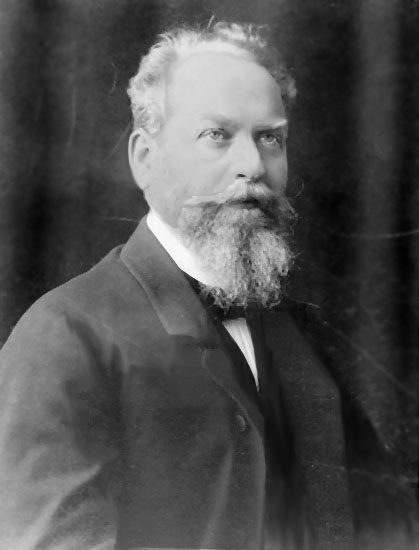
Edmund Husserl in 1900

Husserl derived many important concepts central to phenomenology from the works and lectures of his teachers, the philosophers and psychologists Franz Brentano and Carl Stumpf. An important element of phenomenology that Husserl borrowed from Brentano is intentionality (often described as "aboutness" or "directedness"), the notion that consciousness is always consciousness of something. The object of consciousness is called the intentional object, and this object is constituted for consciousness in many different ways, through, for instance, perception, memory, signification, and so forth. Throughout these different intentionalities, though they have different structures and different ways of being "about" the object, an object is still constituted as the identical object; consciousness is directed at the same intentional object in direct perception as it is in the immediately-following retention of this object and the eventual remembering of it.

As envisioned by Husserl, phenomenology is a method of philosophical inquiry that rejects the rationalist bias that has dominated Western thought since Plato in favor of a method of reflective attentiveness that discloses the individual's "lived experience." Loosely rooted in an epistemological device called epoché, Husserl's method entails the suspension of judgment while relying on the intuitive grasp of knowledge, free of presuppositions and intellectualizing. Sometimes depicted as the "science of experience," the phenomenological method, rooted in intentionality, represents an alternative to the representational theory of consciousness. That theory holds that reality cannot be grasped directly because it is available only through perceptions of reality that are representations in the mind. In Husserl's own words:

experience is not an opening through which a world, existing prior to all experience, shines into a room of consciousness; it is not a mere taking of something alien to consciousness into consciousness... Experience is the performance in which for me, the experiencer, experienced being "is there", and is there as what it is, with the whole content and the mode of being that experience itself, by the performance going on in its intentionality, attributes to it.

In effect, he counters that consciousness is not "in" the mind; rather, consciousness is conscious of something other than itself (the intentional object), regardless of whether the object is a physical thing or just a figment of the imagination.

==== Logical Investigations (1900/1901) ====
In the first edition of the Logical Investigations, under the influence of Brentano, Husserl describes his position as "descriptive psychology." Husserl analyzes the intentional structures of mental acts and how they are directed at both real and ideal objects. The first volume of the Logical Investigations, the Prolegomena to Pure Logic, begins with a critique of psychologism, that is, the attempt to subsume the a priori validity of the laws of logic under psychology. Husserl establishes a separate field for research in logic, philosophy, and phenomenology, independently from the empirical sciences.

"Pre-reflective self-consciousness" is Shaun Gallagher and Dan Zahavi's term for Husserl's (1900/1901) idea that self-consciousness always involves a self-appearance or self-manifestation prior to self-reflection. This is one point of nearly unanimous agreement among phenomenologists: "a minimal form of self-consciousness is a constant structural feature of conscious experience. Experience happens for the experiencing subject in an immediate way and as part of this immediacy, it is implicitly marked as my experience."

==== Ideas (1913) ====
In 1913, Husserl published Ideas: General Introduction to Pure Phenomenology. In this work, he presents phenomenology as a form of "transcendental idealism". Although Husserl claimed to have always been a transcendental idealist, this was not how many of his admirers had interpreted the Logical Investigations, and some were alienated as a result.

This work introduced distinctions between the act of consciousness (noesis) and the phenomena at which it is directed (the noemata). Noetic refers to the intentional act of consciousness (believing, willing, etc.). Noematic refers to the object or content (noema), which appears in the noetic acts (the believed, wanted, hated, loved, etc.).

What is observed is not the object as it is in itself, but how and inasmuch it is given in the intentional acts. Knowledge of essences would only be possible by "bracketing" all assumptions about the existence of an external world and the inessential (subjective) aspects of how the object is concretely given to us. This phenomenological reduction is the second stage of Husserl's procedure of epoché. That which is essential is then determined by the imaginative work of eidetic variation, which is a method for clarifying the features of a thing without which it would not be what it is.

Husserl concentrated more on the ideal, essential structures of consciousness. As he wanted to exclude any hypothesis on the existence of external objects, he introduced the method of phenomenological reduction to eliminate them. What was left over was the pure transcendental ego, as opposed to the concrete empirical ego.

Transcendental phenomenology is the study of the essential structures that are left in pure consciousness: this amounts in practice to the study of the noemata and the relations among them.

==== Munich phenomenology ====
Some phenomenologists were critical of the new theories espoused in Ideas. Members of the Munich group, such as Max Scheler and Roman Ingarden, distanced themselves from Husserl's new transcendental phenomenology. Their theoretical allegiance was to the earlier, realist phenomenology of the first edition of Logical Investigations.

=== Heidegger's conception ===
Martin Heidegger modified Husserl's conception of phenomenology because of what Heidegger perceived as Husserl's subjectivist tendencies. Whereas Husserl conceived humans as having been constituted by states of consciousness, Heidegger countered that consciousness is peripheral to the primacy of one's existence, for which he introduces Dasein as a technical term, which cannot be reduced to a mode of consciousness. From this angle, one's state of mind is an "effect" rather than a determinant of existence, including those aspects of existence of which one is not conscious. By shifting the center of gravity to existence in what he calls fundamental ontology, Heidegger altered the subsequent direction of phenomenology.

According to Heidegger, ontologically-inflected phenomenology is more fundamental than modern scientific inquiry. According to him, science is only one way of knowing the world with no special access to truth. Furthermore, the scientific mindset itself is built on a much more "primordial" foundation of practical, everyday knowledge. This emphasis on the fundamental status of a person's pre-cognitive, practical orientation in the world, sometimes called "know-how", would be adopted by both Sartre and Merleau-Ponty.

While for Husserl, in the epoché, being appeared only as a correlate of consciousness, for Heidegger the pre-conscious grasp of being is the starting point. For this reason, he replaces Husserl's concept of intentionality with the notion of comportment, which is presented as "more primitive" than the "conceptually structured" acts analyzed by Husserl. Paradigmatic examples of comportment can be found in the unreflective dealing with equipment that presents itself as simply "ready-to-hand" in what Heidegger calls the normally circumspect mode of engagement within the world.

For Husserl, all concrete determinations of the empirical ego would have to be abstracted in order to attain pure consciousness. By contrast, Heidegger claims that "the possibilities and destinies of philosophy are bound up with man's existence, and thus with temporality and with historicality." For this reason, all experience must be seen as shaped by social context, which for Heidegger joins phenomenology with philosophical hermeneutics.

Husserl charged Heidegger with raising the question of ontology but failing to answer it, instead switching the topic to Dasein. That is neither ontology nor phenomenology, according to Husserl, but merely abstract anthropology.

While Being and Time and other early works are clearly engaged with Husserlian issues, Heidegger's later philosophy has little relation to the problems and methods of classical phenomenology.

=== Merleau-Ponty's conception ===
Maurice Merleau-Ponty develops his distinctive mode of phenomenology by drawing, in particular, upon Husserl's unpublished writings, Heidegger's analysis of being-in-the-world, Gestalt theory, and other contemporary psychology research. In his most famous work, The Phenomenology of Perception, Merleau-Ponty critiques empiricist and intellectualist accounts to chart a "third way" that avoids their metaphysical assumptions about an objective, pre-given world.

The central contentions of this work are that the body is the locus of engagement with the world, and that the body's modes of engagement are more fundamental than what phenomenology describes as consequent acts of objectification. Merleau-Ponty reinterprets concepts like intentionality, the phenomenological reduction, and the eidetic method to capture our inherence in the perceived world, that is, our embodied coexistence with things through a kind of reciprocal exchange. According to Merleau-Ponty, perception discloses a meaningful world that can never be completely determined, but which nevertheless aims at truth.

== Varieties ==
Some scholars have differentiated phenomenology into seven types:

1. Transcendental constitutive phenomenology studies how objects are constituted in transcendental consciousness, setting aside questions of any relation to the natural world.
2. Naturalistic constitutive phenomenology studies how consciousness constitutes things in the world of nature, assuming with the natural attitude that consciousness is part of nature.
3. Generative historicist phenomenology studies how meaning—as found in human experience—is generated in historical processes of collective experience over time.
4. Genetic phenomenology (sometimes "phenomenology of genesis") studies the emergence of meanings of things within the stream of experience.
5. Hermeneutic phenomenology studies interpretive structures of experience. This approach was introduced in Martin Heidegger's early work.
6. Existential phenomenology studies concrete human existence, including human experience of free choice and/or action in concrete situations.
7. Realist(ic) phenomenology (sometimes "phenomenology of essences") studies the structure of consciousness and intentionality as "it occurs in a real world that is largely external to consciousness and not somehow brought into being by consciousness."

The contrast between "constitutive phenomenology" (sometimes "static/descriptive phenomenology") and "genetic phenomenology" is due to Husserl.

Modern scholarship also recognizes the existence of the following varieties:

1. Early-Heideggerian transcendental hermeneutic phenomenology
2. Late-Heideggerian destructive phenomenology (cf. Destruktion)
3. Herbert Marcuse's dialectical phenomenology
4. Maurice Merleau-Ponty's embodied phenomenology
5. Michel Henry's material phenomenology
6. J. L. Austin's linguistic phenomenology
7. Alva Noë's analytic phenomenology
8. Paul Crowther's post-analytic phenomenology
9. Lisa Guenther's critical phenomenology
10. Cornelius Castoriadis' and Don Ihde's post-phenomenology emphasizes the significance of social analysis and views culture as the medium through which the human encounter with the broader world is articulated.

== Concepts ==
=== Intentionality ===
Intentionality refers to the notion that consciousness is always the consciousness of something. The word itself should not be confused with the "ordinary" use of the word intentional, but should rather be taken as playing on the etymological roots of the word. Originally, intention referred to a "stretching out" ("in tension," from Latin intendere), and in this context it refers to consciousness "stretching out" towards its object. However, one should be careful with this image: there is not some consciousness first that, subsequently, stretches out to its object; rather, consciousness occurs as the simultaneity of a conscious act and its object.

Intentionality is often summed up as "aboutness." Whether this something that consciousness is about is in direct perception or in fantasy is inconsequential to the concept of intentionality itself; whatever consciousness is directed at, that is what consciousness is conscious of. This means that the object of consciousness does not have to be a physical object apprehended in perception: it can just as well be a fantasy or a memory. Consequently, these "structures" of consciousness, such as perception, memory, fantasy, and so forth, are called intentionalities.

The term "intentionality" originated with the Scholastics in the medieval period and was resurrected by Brentano who in turn influenced Husserl's conception of phenomenology, who refined the term and made it the cornerstone of his theory of consciousness. The meaning of the term is complex and depends entirely on how it is conceived by a given philosopher. The term should not be confused with "intention" or the psychoanalytic conception of unconscious "motive" or "gain".

Significantly, "intentionality is not a relation, but rather an intrinsic feature of intentional acts." This is because there are no independent relata. It is (at least in the first place) a matter of indifference to the phenomenologist whether the intentional object has any existence independent of the act.

=== Intuition ===
Intuition in phenomenology refers to cases where the intentional object is directly present to the intentionality at play; if the intention is "filled" by the direct apprehension of the object, one has an intuited object. Having a cup of coffee in front of oneself, for instance, seeing it, feeling it, or even imagining it – these are all filled intentions, and the object is then intuited. The same goes for the apprehension of mathematical formulae or a number. If one does not have the object as referred to directly, the object is not intuited, but still intended, but then emptily. Examples of empty intentions can be signitive intentions – intentions that only imply or refer to their objects.

=== Evidence ===
In everyday language, the word evidence is used to signify a special sort of relation between a state of affairs and a proposition: State A is evidence for the proposition "A is true." In phenomenology, however, the concept of evidence is meant to signify the "subjective achievement of truth." This is not an attempt to reduce the objective sort of evidence to subjective "opinion," but rather an attempt to describe the structure of having something present in intuition with the addition of having it present as intelligible: "Evidence is the successful presentation of an intelligible object, the successful presentation of something whose truth becomes manifest in the evidencing itself."

In Ideas, Husserl presents as the "Principle of All Principles" that, "every originary presentive intuition is a legitimizing source of cognition, that everything originally (so to speak, in its 'personal' actuality) offered to us in 'intuition' is to be accepted simply as what it is presented as being, but also only within the limits in which it is presented there." It is in this realm of phenomenological givenness, Husserl claims, that the search begins for "indubitable evidence that will ultimately serve as the foundation for every scientific discipline."

=== Noesis and noema ===
Franz Brentano distinguished between sensory and noetic consciousness: the former concerns presentations of sensory objects or intuitions, while the latter concerns the thinking of concepts.

In Husserl's phenomenology, this pair of terms, derived from the Greek nous (mind), designate respectively the real content, noesis, and the ideal content, noema, of an intentional act (an act of consciousness). The noesis is the part of the act that gives it a particular sense or character (as in judging or perceiving something, loving or hating it, accepting or rejecting it, etc.). This is real in the sense that it is actually part of what takes place in the consciousness of the subject of the act. The noesis is always correlated with a noema. For Husserl, the full noema is a complex ideal structure comprising at least a noematic sense and a noematic core. The correct interpretation of what Husserl meant by the noema has long been controversial, but the noematic sense is generally understood as the ideal meaning of the act. For instance, if A loves B, loving is a real part of A's conscious activity – noesis – but gets its sense from the general concept of loving, which has an abstract or ideal meaning, as "loving" has a meaning in the English language independently of what an individual means by the word when they use it. The noematic core as the act's referent or object as it is meant in the act. One element of controversy is whether this noematic object is the same as the actual object of the act (assuming it exists) or is some kind of ideal object.

=== Empathy and intersubjectivity ===
In phenomenology, empathy refers to the experience of one's own body as another. While people often identify others with their physical bodies, this type of phenomenology requires that they focus on the subjectivity of the other, as well as the intersubjective engagement with them. In Husserl's original account, this was done by a sort of apperception built on the experiences of one's own lived body. The lived body is one's own body as experienced by oneself, as oneself. One's own body manifests itself mainly as one's possibilities of acting in the world. It is what lets oneself reach out and grab something, for instance, but it also, and more importantly, allows for the possibility of changing one's point of view. This helps to differentiate one thing from another by the experience of moving around it, seeing new aspects of it (often referred to as making the absent present and the present absent), and still retaining the notion that this is the same thing that one saw other aspects of just a moment ago (it is identical). One's body is also experienced as a duality, both as object (one's ability to touch one's own hand) and as one's own subjectivity (one's experience of being touched).

The experience of one's own body as one's own subjectivity is then applied to the experience of another's body, which, through apperception, is constituted as another subjectivity. One can thus recognise the Other's intentions and emotions. In Edith Stein's research, a student of Husserl, my own "attributes declare the nature of my individual to me. We can designate this viewing inner perception of self". In the same book, from the "self" she deduces the characteristics of the spiritual person for oneself and for others. This experience of empathy is important in the phenomenological account of intersubjectivity. In phenomenology, intersubjectivity constitutes objectivity (i.e., what one experiences as objective is experienced as being intersubjectively available – available to all other subjects). This does not imply that objectivity is reduced to subjectivity nor does it imply a relativist position; cf. for instance intersubjective verifiability). In the experience of intersubjectivity, one also experiences oneself as being a subject among other subjects, and one experiences oneself as existing objectively for these Others; one experiences oneself as the noema of Others' noeses, or as a subject in another's empathic experience. As such, one experiences oneself as objectively existing subjectivity. Intersubjectivity is also a part of the constitution of one's lifeworld, especially as "homeworld."

=== Lifeworld ===
The lifeworld (German: Lebenswelt) is the "world" each one of us lives in. One could call it the "background" or "horizon" of all experience, and it is that on which each object stands out as itself (as different) and with the meaning it can only hold for us. According to Husserl, the lifeworld is both personal and intersubjective (it is then called a "homeworld"), and, as such, it avoids the threat of solipsism.

In his 2002 book entitled Derrida and Husserl: The Basic Problem of Phenomenology, American academic and author Leonard Lawlor uses the term "life-ism" to refer to a unified field within the philosophy of Maurice Merleau-Ponty, Jacques Derrida, Gilles Deleuze, Martin Heidegger and Michel Foucault, that focuses on life and death, involving concepts such as Edmund Husserl's Erlebnis and Henri Bergson's élan vital. This is echoed by Michael R. Kelly in his 2016 book Phenomenology and the Problem of Time in which he wrote that there is a certain life-ism in French phenomenology from the 1940s onwards, citing as examples Jean-Paul Sartre's Transcendence of the Ego which influenced Deleuze, Merleau-Ponty's idea of latent intentionality, the flesh, wild-being; Michel Henry's monolith on life that starts with his Essence of Manifestation, and Jean-Luc Marion's Being Given.

== Phenomenology and empirical science ==
The phenomenological analysis of objects is notably different from traditional science. However, several frameworks do phenomenology with an empirical orientation or aim to unite it with the natural sciences or with cognitive science.

For a classical critical point of view, Daniel Dennett argues for the wholesale uselessness of phenomenology considering phenomena as qualia, which cannot be the object of scientific research or do not exist in the first place. Liliana Albertazzi counters such arguments by pointing out that empirical research on phenomena has been successfully carried out employing modern methodology. Human experience can be investigated by surveying, and with brain scanning techniques. For example, ample research on color perception suggests that people with normal color vision see colors similarly and not each in their own way. Thus, it is possible to universalize phenomena of subjective experience on an empirical scientific basis.

In the early twenty-first century, phenomenology has increasingly engaged with cognitive science and philosophy of mind. Some approaches to the naturalization of phenomenology reduce consciousness to the physical-neuronal level and are therefore not widely acknowledged as representing phenomenology. These include the frameworks of neurophenomenology, embodied constructivism, and the cognitive neuroscience of phenomenology. Other likewise controversial approaches aim to explain life-world experience on a sociological or anthropological basis despite phenomenology being mostly considered descriptive rather than explanatory.

== See also ==
- Binding problem
- Existentialism
- Geneva School
- Hard problem of consciousness
- Heterophenomenology
- Phenomenography
- Phenomenology of religion
- Vertiginous question
