= Edith Stein =

German nun and philosopher (1891–1942)

Saint Teresa Benedicta of the Cross (Edith Stein) OCD
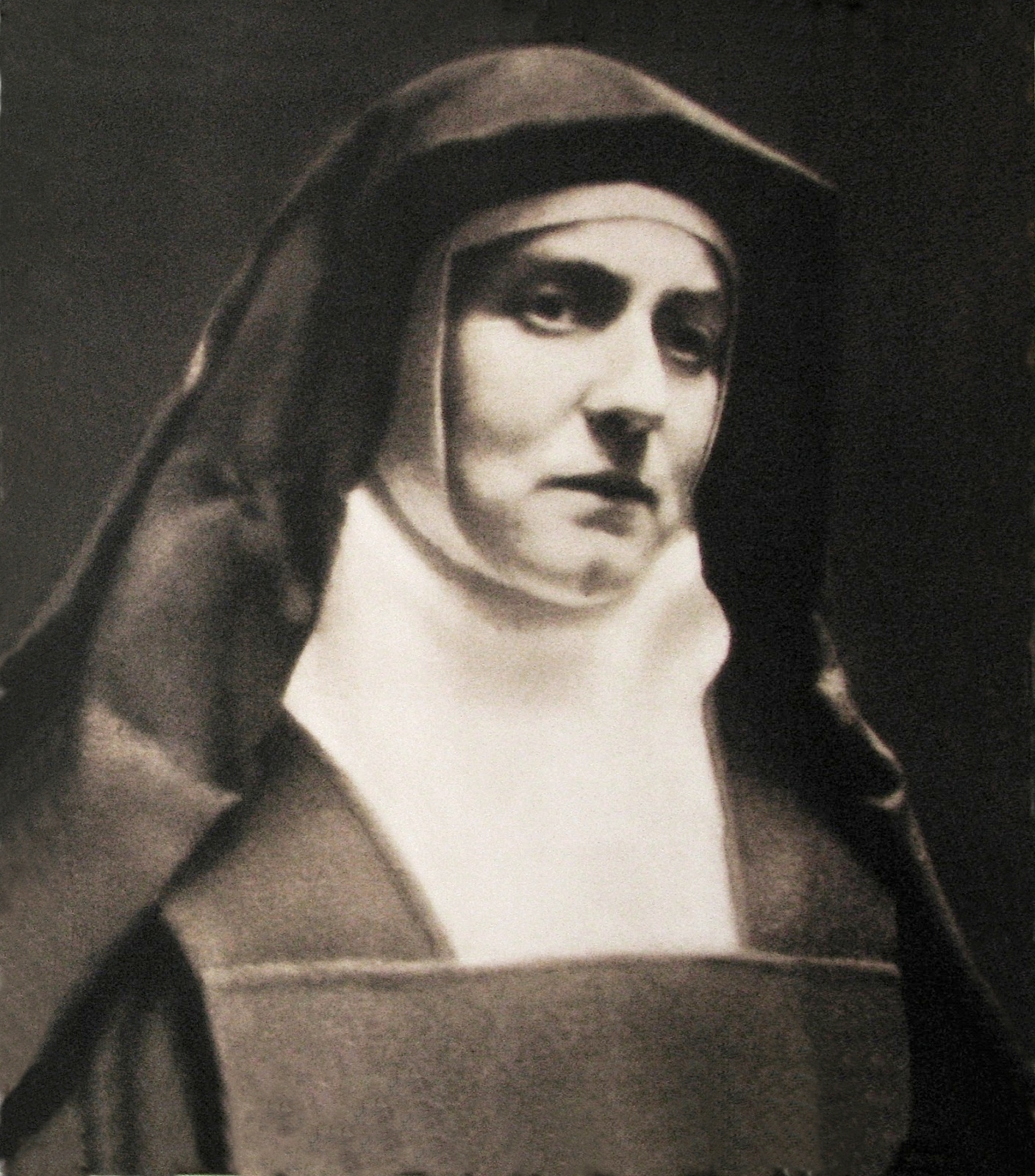
- Teresa Benedicta of the Cross in December 1938
- Born: Edith Stein; 12 October 1891; Breslau, German Empire
- Died: c. 9 August 1942 (aged 50); Auschwitz-Birkenau, Gau Upper Silesia, German-occupied Poland

Sainthood
- Feast day: 9 August
- Venerated in: Catholic Church; Anglican Communion
- Beatified: 1 May 1987; Cologne, Germany by Pope John Paul II
- Canonized: 11 October 1998; Vatican City by Pope John Paul II
- Attributes: Discalced Carmelite nun's habit (sometimes with a Yellow badge), cross, a book or scroll with Hebrew letters, burning bush, martyr's palm
- Patronage: Europe; loss of parents; converted Jews; martyrs; World Youth Day

Academic background
- Education: Schlesische Friedrich-Wilhelms-Universität; University of Göttingen; University of Freiburg (PhD, 1916)
- Thesis: The Empathy Problem as it Developed Historically and Considered Phenomenologically (1916)
- Doctoral advisor: Edmund Husserl

Academic work
- Era: 20th-century philosophy
- Region: Western philosophy
- School or tradition: Continental philosophy; Phenomenology; Thomism; Carmelite spirituality
- Institutions: University of Freiburg (1916–1918)
- Main interests: Metaphysics, phenomenology, philosophy of mind and epistemology
- Notable works: On the Problem of Empathy; Finite and Eternal Being; Philosophy of Psychology and the Humanities; The Science of the Cross
- Notable ideas: Spirituality of the Christian woman; Phenomenological empathy

Edith Stein (12 October 1891 – c. 9 August 1942), Saint Teresa Benedicta of the Cross, was a German philosopher and Discalced Carmelite nun. Known for her phenomenological research on empathy under Edmund Husserl, she later integrated scholasticism and mysticism in her writings and lectured extensively on women's vocation and education. Raised in a Jewish family, she converted to Catholicism in 1922 and entered Carmel in 1933. During the Holocaust, she was deported to Auschwitz-Birkenau and murdered in 1942; she was canonized as a martyr and is one of the patron saints of Europe.

Stein was born into an observant German Jewish family, but gave up prayer in her teenage years. After beginning university studies in psychology before moving to Göttingen to study philosophy under Husserl, her education was interrupted by World War I, during which she volunteered at an Austro-Hungarian military hospital in 1915. Returning to earn her doctorate at the University of Freiburg in 1916 with a dissertation published as On the Problem of Empathy, she served as Husserl's assistant before pursuing a habilitation, which was repeatedly blocked by gender and anti-Jewish prejudice. After reading the autobiography of the Carmelite reformer Teresa of Ávila, Stein converted to Catholicism in 1922 and taught at a Catholic school in Speyer while translating Thomas Aquinas and lecturing widely on women's roles in society and education.

Dismissed from her teaching post in Münster under Nazi anti-Jewish laws in 1933, Stein entered the Discalced Carmelite convent in Cologne, where she wrote her philosophical magnum opus, Finite and Eternal Being. Following the "Kristallnacht" pogroms in 1938, she transferred to a Carmelite convent in Echt, Netherlands, where she completed her final mystical work, The Science of the Cross. Arrested by the Gestapo in 1942, in retaliation for a Dutch bishops' pastoral letter condemning Nazi deportations of Jews, she was murdered at Auschwitz-Birkenau alongside her biological sister Rosa. She was beatified in 1987 and canonized in 1998.

Pope John Paul II named her one of the six patron saints of Europe in 1999 to highlight women's dignity, moral responsibility, and solidarity with victims of persecution, also including her in his encyclical Fides et Ratio as the sole woman among modern Christian thinkers uniting philosophy and theology. While her designation as a Christian martyr remains a subject of Jewish–Catholic debate, her phenomenological grounding of the human person continues to inform contemporary ethical discussions of women's roles, education, and the nature of the state. A 2024 Carmelite petition to declare her Doctor of the Church was provisionally declined, though the order plans to resubmit it.

== Early life ==
Photograph of Edith Stein's Family in 1895. Edith is the young girl sitting in the front. (Note: The image of the father, the bearded man in the center, was added from a previous picture, as he had died in 1893)

Edith Stein was born into a Jewish family on Yom Kippur, 12 October 1891, in Breslau, in the German Empire (now Wrocław, Poland). She was the youngest of eleven children, seven of whom lived to adulthood. Her father Siegfried died before her second birthday, leaving her mother Auguste to run the family lumber business. Though Auguste was devout, Edith appears to have received minimal religious training in Judaism.

Stein entered the Viktoriaschule, a girls' school in Breslau, at age six. In 1906, she completed her secondary education at fourteen, and took a year-long break to live with her non-religious older sister and brother-in-law in Hamburg, where she consciously gave up prayer. Upon returning to Breslau, she entered the Gymnasium to prepare for university, graduating in March 1911 with written exam scores high enough to exempt her from oral exams.

== Academic career ==
=== Breslau, 1911–1913 ===
Edith Stein with family and friends, 1911. (Stein is in the light jacket to the left of the woman with the child)

In April 1911, Stein entered the Schlesische Friedrich-Wilhelms-Universität (Silesian Friedrich Wilhelm University) in Breslau, to study psychology, history, and German studies. During her first semester, she attended Richard Hönigswald's natural philosophy course. She also studied psychology with William Stern, her first choice for dissertation advisor, who introduced her to his "Pedagogical Group" exploring teacher education, an association she considered the highlight of her time at the university.

During a 1911 psychology seminar on thought associated with the Würzburg School, Stein encountered many references to the philosopher Edmund Husserl's Logical Investigations. (Note: Logische Untersuchungen.) She was also inspired to learn that a woman, Hedwig Conrad-Martius, (Note: At that time, her last name was Martius; she changed her name to the one she is known by, Conrad-Martius, when she married Theodor Conrad.) had won a prestigious essay prize from the University of Göttingen philosophy faculty. (Note: She would earn her doctorate on the basis of that essay in Munich in 1912, titled Die erkenntnistheoretischen Grundlagen des Positivismus (The Epistemological Foundations of Positivism).) Soon after reading a cousin's letter inviting her to study at Göttingen, Stein decided to spend her upcoming summer there. During Christmas break, she familiarized herself with phenomenology by reading the second volume of Logical Investigations. (Note: The full German title of Husserl's work is Logische Untersuchungen. Zweiter Teil. Untersuchungen zur Phänomenologie und Theorie der Erkenntnis (Logical Investigations. Second Part. Investigations Concerning Phenomenology and the Theory of Knowledge).) Before departing for Göttingen, she asked Stern to serve as her dissertation advisor; (Note: In Germany, there were two dissertations required to become a full professor, an Inauguraldissertation and a Habilitation. The Habilitation is typically required for full professorship.) he proposed she study the development of children's thoughts; en route, she stopped at the Institute of Applied Psychology near Potsdam to meet with Otto Lipmann, one of Stern's collaborators.

=== Göttingen, 1913–1915 ===
==== Summer 1913 ====
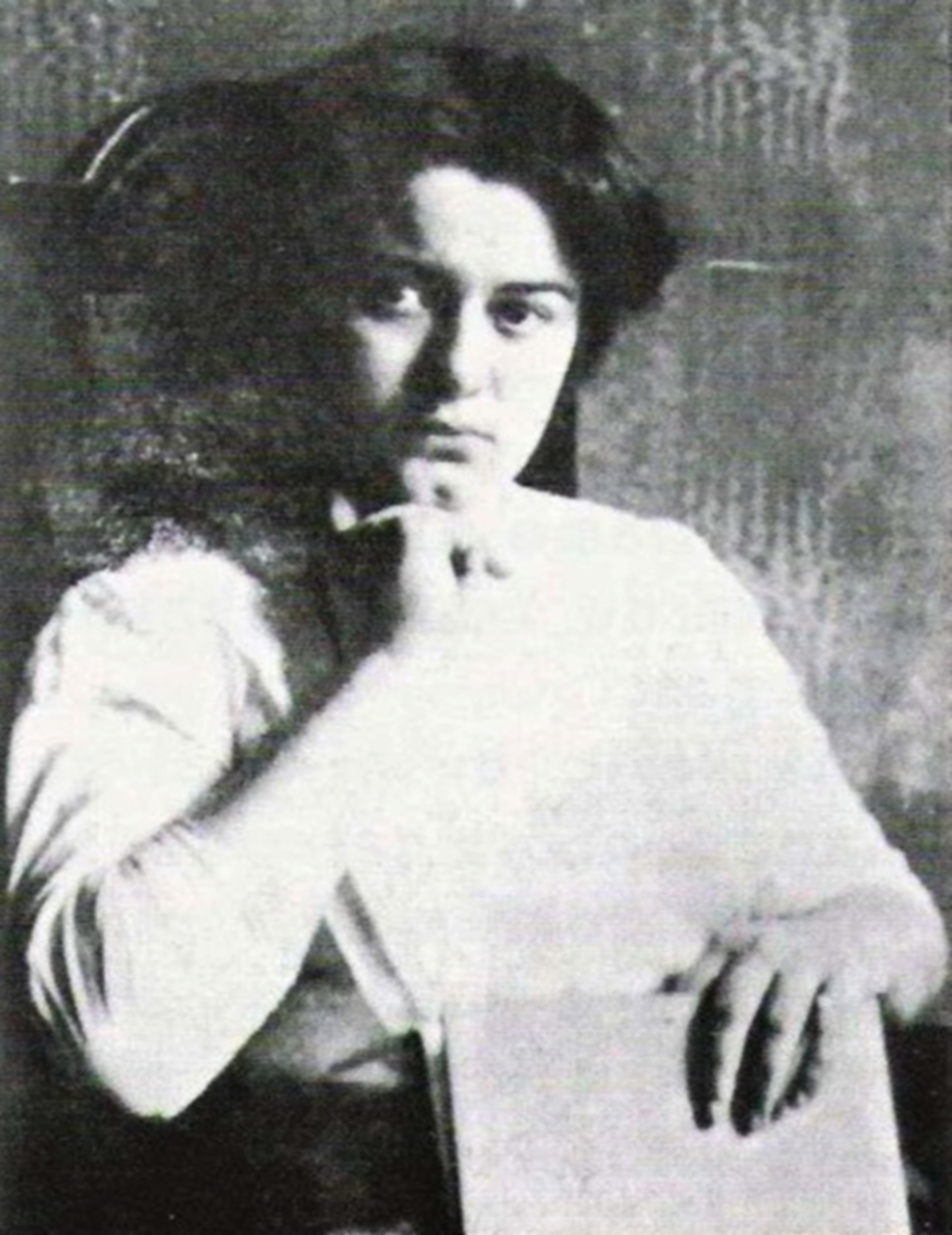
Edith Stein, student, c. 1913

Arriving at the University of Göttingen in April 1913 for the summer semester, the 21-year-old Stein introduced herself to Adolf Reinach, a privatdozent in philosophy. Reinach helped Stein secure a spot in Husserl's summer seminar, which was influenced by his newly published work, Ideas I. (Note: Ideen zu einer reinen Phänomenologie und phänomenologischen Philosophie. Erstes Buch: Allgemeine Einführung in die reine Phänomenologie (Ideas Pertaining to a Pure Phenomenology and to a Phenomenological Philosophy. First Book: General Introduction to Pure Phenomenology).) In this work, Husserl aimed to build a critique of naturalism and objectivity that would replace psychology's claim as an objective science with a more rigorous transcendental science of subjectivity.

Stein also took a history seminar with Max Lehmann, looking at the Constitution of the German Empire, who recommended her paper analyzing the party programs of the 1849 Frankfurt Constitution as a state board examination thesis. She joined the Philosophical Society, (Note: Many of the founding members of this society, including Hedwig Conrad-Martius, and Alexander Koyré, whom she would meet later, had left Göttingen before Stein arrived in summer 1913.) a group of Husserl's students, attending off-campus lectures by Max Scheler, who was banned from the society due to personal indiscretions. Scheler had just published a phenomenological study on empathy. (Note: Zur Phänomenologie und Theorie der Sympathiegefühle und von Liebe und Hass (On the Phenomenology and Theory of Sympathy Feelings and of Love and Hate). It was revised a decade later as Wesen und Formen der Sympathie (Essence and Forms of Sympathy).) Despite her reservations about his behavior, his lectures opened her to Catholic thought and directly inspired her own interest in empathy. By the end of the summer, she had decided to write her dissertation under Husserl on empathy, officially informing Stern she was leaving psychology.

==== October 1913–January 1915 ====
Stein returned to Göttingen for the 1913–1914 winter semester after a brief stay in Breslau. She grew closer to Reinach, who mentored her in the basics of phenomenology, and strengthened connections with fellow phenomenology students, including Hans Lipps, Fritz Kaufmann, and Roman Ingarden; she also met Jean Héring, who briefly came to take his state exams. While preparing for her own state exams, Stein focused on her dissertation, contrasting her phenomenological view of empathy with the perspective of Theodor Lipps, the major theorist at that time. Reinach's constant support sustained her through periods of despair and suicidal ideation.

When Germany declared a state of war at the end of July 1914, classes were cancelled. Stein returned to Breslau to register for Red Cross nursing to support the German war effort. Before being called up, she returned to Göttingen and completed her state examinations with highest honors in January 1915. During this time she also served as the vocational counselor for women students for the Frauenbildung-Frauenstudium-Verein [Society for Women's Education—Women's Studies].

=== Interlude: Red Cross service, April–September 1915 ===
Edith Stein as a volunteer nurse, (left foreground) at the military reserve hospital in Mährisch Weißkirchen, 1915

Upon returning to Breslau after her state exams, Stein was called up to serve as a volunteer nurse in an Austro-Hungarian military reserve hospital in Mährisch Weißkirchen, arriving in early April 1915. She worked in the typhus ward, transferring to an operating room three months later. Furloughed after six months of service, she earned a Medal of Valor for her dedication and expected to return, but the hospital closed when the military front shifted east.

Her service exposed her to an ethnically and linguistically diverse environment. Though the nurses and aides were German, the hospital operated under Czech leadership and was mostly staffed with Czech and Polish doctors, treating patients from the various ethnolinguistic groups across the empire, as well as Russians, Turks, and Romanies. Stein relied on a nine-language manual to communicate with those she served.

=== Breslau, September 1915–July 1916 ===
Stein spent the remainder of 1915 writing her dissertation. During Christmas, she visited Adolf Reinach, who had volunteered to serve in the German Army and was on leave with his wife Anna. She also met with Husserl to discuss her Red Cross service in his native Moravia. While teaching Latin, German, history, and geography at the Realgymnasium at the Victoriaschule in Breslau, she finished the manuscript during the 1916 Easter break and sent it to Husserl at his new post at the University of Freiburg.

=== Freiburg, 1916–1918 ===
In July 1916, Stein traveled to the University of Freiburg during the summer break to take her doctoral oral examination. Upon arriving, she discovered that Husserl had not yet read her dissertation, though he agreed to do so with prodding from his wife Malvine. Stein set the examination for August 3, so she could return to her teaching before the break was over. Meanwhile, she attended Husserl's summer seminar and met Martin Heidegger at a social event hosted by the Husserls.

Before the oral examination, Husserl praised her dissertation, prompting Stein to propose being his literary assistant and collaborator, an offer Husserl accepted. After passing her exam, she was awarded a PhD, summa cum laude. The following year, she published three of the seven dissertation chapters as On the Problem of Empathy, (Note: The complete dissertation is Das Einfühlungsproblem in seiner historischen Entwicklung und in phänomenologischer Betrachtung (The Empathy Problem as it Developed Historically and Considered Phenomenologically). The three chapters Stein published are Zum Problem der Einfühlung (The Problem of Empathy).) while the four unpublished chapters on community, aesthetics, and ethics, as well as the literature review, were subsequently lost. Returning to Breslau after her defense, Stein was officially released from her teaching duties at the end of September.

Sample of Husserl's Gabelsberger shorthand

Stein returned to Freiburg in October 1916 as Husserl's private research assistant. Receiving a token salary, she relied on an allowance from her mother. She taught a beginning seminar in phenomenology, (Note: Stein refers to this proseminar as her "kindergarten".) but her main responsibility was to organize his research manuscripts. Because much of the material consisted of unpublishable scraps written in Gabelsberger shorthand, she organized, edited, and clarified them, frequently consulting Husserl. Her major contributions included Ideas II, (Note: Ideen zu einer reinen Phänomenologie und phänomenologischen Philosophie. Zweites Buch: Phänomenologische Untersuchungen zur Konstitution (Ideas Pertaining to a Pure Phenomenology and to a Phenomenological Philosophy. Second Book: Studies in the Phenomenology of Constitution).) posthumously published in 1952, and On the Phenomenology of Time Consciousness, (Note: Zur Phänomenologie des inneren Zeitbewusstseins.) published in 1928 with Heidegger credited as the editor.

During this time, Stein learned that Reinach had died in November 1917, a loss that deeply moved her and marked a turning point in her life. Adolf and Anna Reinach had converted to Protestantism in 1916, and while helping Anna organize his literary legacy, Stein was struck by how Anna's faith helped her bear her grief. In February 1918, after reading Reinach's religio-philosophical notes on how the war brought him to faith, Stein began to identify herself as a Christian. In that same month, she resigned her position with Husserl, having expressed dissatisfaction with the work in her private letters.

=== Independent scholar: Breslau, Göttingen, Freiburg, 1918–1920 ===
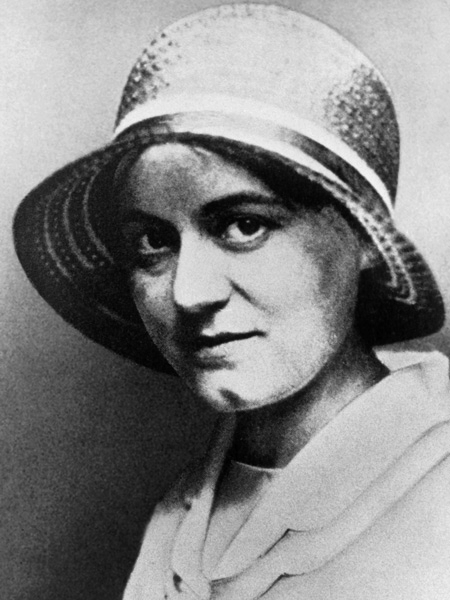
Edith Stein after earning her doctorate, c. 1920–1921

After resigning her assistantship in 1918, Stein traveled frequently between Breslau, Göttingen, and Freiburg, mainly living with her family in Breslau. She joined the German Democratic Party, actively engaging in youth organization, coalition building, and shaping the party's position on issues like women's suffrage.

In the months following Reinach's death, Stein prepared a commemorative edition of his writings, reaching out to former Göttingen students like Hedwig Conrad-Martius and Jean Héring. Reinach's Collected Writings (Note: Gesammelte Schriften) was published in 1921 with an introduction by Conrad-Martius. Around the same time, she initiated a Festschrift for Husserl's sixtieth birthday in 1919, enlisting contributors, convincing Alexander Pfänder to serve as editor, and committing to an essay on psychic causality. (Note: The Festschrift was published in 1922 as the fifth volume of the Jahrbuch für Philosophie und phänomenologische Forschung [Yearbook for Philosophy and Phenomenological Research] and included one of Stein's papers.)

Completed in 1919, Stein's two manuscripts, Psychic Causality and The Individual and Community, (Note: Psychische Kausalität and Individuum und Gemeinschaft, respectively. They were submitted together as Beiträge zur philosophischen Begründung der Psychologie und der Geisteswissenschaften (Contribution to the Philosophical Foundation of Psychology and the Humanities)) were submitted as her Habilitationsschrift for a lectureship at Freiburg or Göttingen. Her application was officially rejected because she was a woman. After Stein protested to Berlin and cited mathematician Emmy Noether's successful habilitation, the minister of education issued a supportive note to universities. Nevertheless, her candidacy failed due to anti-Jewish prejudice, faculty wariness, academic politics, and Husserl's lack of support, as he doubted the appropriateness of academic careers for women. In late 1920, she helped Hans Lipps write his Habilitationsschrift, which secured him a lectureship at Göttingen. (Note: Stein had strong feelings for Lipps. Conrad-Martius 1998, pp. 265–266 states that Stein would have married him if he had wanted it. He served in the Wehrmacht in World War II and died on 10 September 1941, during the invasion of the Soviet Union.)

In 1920, Stein gave private lessons in phenomenology and worked on a third manuscript. An Investigation Concerning the State, (Note: Eine Untersuchung über den Staat.) Drawing on her phenomenological training under Reinach and Lehmann, Stein attempted to address Germany's post-war political instability. The two treatises from her Habilitationsschrift were published in 1922; her treatise on the state appeared in 1925.

== Bergzabern and conversion to Catholicism ==
=== The Bergzabern Circle, 1920–1921 ===
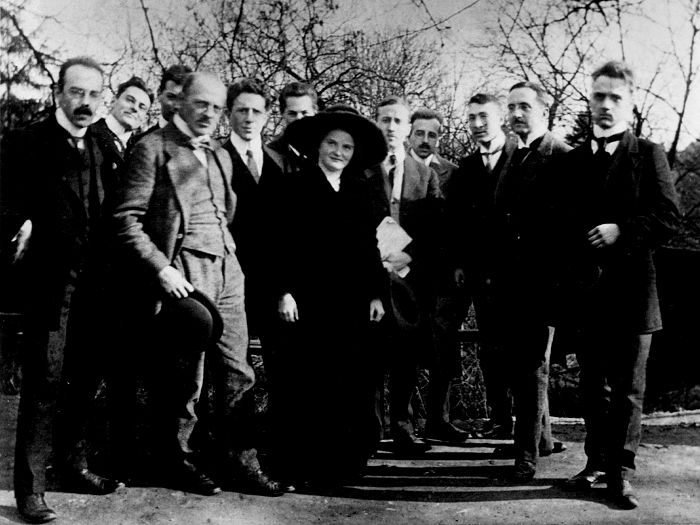
Group portrait of phenomenology faculty and students in Göttingen c. 1912 with Hedwig Conrad-Martius standing in the center wearing the dark hat. A number would become associated with the Bergzabern Circle (Note: Adolf Reinach is on the extreme left; Jean Héring is to his right with a tilted head; Max Scheler stands with doffed hat and hand in pocket; Alexandre Koyré is between Scheler and Hedwig Conrad-Martius with his face and tie fully visible; to her right is Hans Lipps with a tie and holding papers.)

While preparing Reinach's writings in 1920, Stein was invited to Bergzabern by Conrad-Martius, who had moved to a fruit farm with her husband Theodor after being denied a university position as a woman. Arriving in late summer for a few months, Stein met Conrad-Martius in person for the first time while both were experiencing an existential crisis that hindered their ability to do philosophy, leading the two to form a close relationship.

In summer 1921, Stein returned to Bergzabern for an extended stay. On her way, she stopped to visit Anna Reinach, who invited her to choose a book from the family library as a gift. She selected Teresa of Ávila's autobiography and took it with her to the farm. (Note: Beckmann-Zöller states that the popular story that Stein had chosen the book at random from the Conrads' library originates from Stein's first biographer, Teresia Renata Posselt, who was Stein's novice mistress; Beckmann-Zöller suggests it may have been a memory slip, as Sister Teresia was unable to verify the story with any of the people directly involved.) During these months, she reconnected with other former Göttingen students, including Alfred von Sybel, Lipps, Hering, and Alexandre Koyré, whom she had not met before, forming a supportive network connected by Reinach's influence known as the Bergzabern Circle. She also engaged in intense conversations with Conrad-Martius, who was developing her theory of the person as body, soul, and spirit for her book, Metaphysical Conversations. (Note: Metaphysische Gespräche, published in 1921.)

=== Conversion and baptism, 1921–1922 ===
1922 baptismal record of Edith Stein from Parish Church of St. Martin in Bad Bergzabern, Germany

Reading Teresa of Ávila's autobiography at the Conrads' home prompted Stein to convert to the Roman Catholic Church. During the rest of her stay, she attended Mass at the Parish Church of St. Martin and studied a catechism and the missal, frequently seeking the quiet of the evangelical Bergkirche to read the Bible on her own. Returning to Breslau, she began writing Freedom and Grace, a phenomenological treatment on religious commitment. (Note: Freiheit und Gnade)

Upon returning to Bergzabern in October, the thirty-year-old Stein requested baptism from Pastor Eugen Breitling, who baptized her at St. Martin's on 1 January 1922, where she took the baptismal name Theresia Hedwig. Conrad-Martius received special dispensation to serve as her godmother, loaning Stein her white wedding cloak for the ceremony. She received her first Holy Communion the next day, and was confirmed by Ludwig Sebastian, Bishop of Speyer, in his private chapel on February 2. Breitling introduced her to Joseph Schwind, Cathedral Canon and Custodian of Speyer, as her spiritual director.

== Teaching career ==
=== Speyer, 1923–1931 ===
View of St. Magdalena from the tower of Speyer Cathedral

Edith Stein as a teacher at St. Magdalena c. 1926

After her baptism, Stein expressed a desire to join a Discalced Carmelite monastery, but Schwind advised her to place her talents at the service of the larger Catholic world. Following a brief period of teaching at the Victoriaschule in Breslau, Schwind helped her secure a position at the Dominican Convent of St. Magdalena in Speyer. Beginning in spring 1923, she taught German and history at the girls' secondary school, as well as Latin and philosophy at the teachers' training college, which left her little time for original philosophical work over the next few years.

From 1923 to 1925, Stein translated the writings of John Henry Newman into German at the invitation of Dietrich von Hildebrand, a Göttingen phenomenology alumnus who had converted to Catholicism. Hildebrand connected her with Jesuit Erich Przywara, who was co-editing a German edition of Newman's works, leading to their translation of The Idea of a University, along with several letters and Newman's autobiography. Przywara visited Stein in Speyer in 1925, (Note: Some scholars state that the collaboration between Przywara and Stein began when they met in 1925 (e.g.,Gonzales 2016, p. 125, Knab 2026); others state they were collaborating through correspondence as early as 1923 (e.g., Gerl-Falkovitz 2006, p. 149, Dupuis 2016). A clear timeline of their collaboration is difficult to resolve because most of the letters between them were intentionally destroyed.) where both agreed on the urgent need for dialogue between traditional Catholic philosophy and contemporary phenomenology.

Encouraged by Przywara, she requested a reduction of teaching hours to translate Thomas Aquinas's Quaestiones Disputatae de Veritate (Disputed Questions Concerning Truth), transposing Thomistic language into a phenomenological idiom. Over the following years, Przywara and Stein would explore how scholastic concepts, particularly the analogia entis (The analogy of being), could open a contemporary philosophical discussion of the relationship between God and human existence. These explorations would influence their later publications, including Przywara's Analogia Entis. (Note: Analogia Entis: Metaphysik. Ur-Struktur und All-Rhythmus (Analogia Entis. Metaphysics: Original Structure and Universal Rhythm))

Stein remained closely connected with Bergzabern, visiting the Conrads' farm during school breaks. There, she and Conrad-Martius translated an essay by Koyré into German in 1923, (Note: Descartes und die Scholastik, published in 1923) and in 1925, members of the Bergzabern Circle met at the farm to review papers by Lipps and Ingarden. In 1928, the group gathered again to coordinate contributions for Husserl's 70th birthday Festschrift. When Stein later entered the Carmelite Monastery in Cologne, she informed the Conrads that she could no longer visit, but invited them to visit her.

Following Schwind's death in 1927, Stein turned to Raphael Walzer, the Archabbot of the Benedictine abbey in Beuron, at Przywara's recommendation. Between 1928 and 1933, she visited the abbey over twenty times, often on solemnities and feasts to participate in the liturgy with the monks. Like Schwind, Walzer counseled her to remain in the world rather than enter Carmel. Prompted by Przywara to study the role of women in society and the Church, she established herself as an international lecturer across Germany and Austria, presenting papers on women's vocation and educational principles, which she actively applied to her own teaching. During this period, she also contributed an essay, "Husserl and Aquinas: A Comparison", (Note: "Husserls Phänomenologie und die Philosophie des heiligen Thomas von Aquino. Versuch einer Gegenüberstellung" ("Husserl's Phenomenology and the Philosophy of St. Thomas Aquinas: An Attempt at a Comparison")) to Husserl's 1929 Festschrift.

=== Second attempt at habilitation, 1931–1932 ===
Seeking to continue her work on Thomism and phenomenology, she started a new habilitation during her visit to Freiburg for Husserl's 70th birthday. There, Emeritus Professor of History Heinrich Finke advised her not to bury her talents, which led to a January 1931 meeting in Freiburg with Finke, Heidegger, and Martin Honecker. Heidegger appeared open, and Husserl seemed receptive when informed. Honecker, the chair of Roman Catholic philosophy, agreed to accept the proposal. By March 1931, Stein had resigned her position in Speyer and returned to Breslau to focus on her treatise, Potency and Act, (Note: Potenz und Akt: Studien zu einer Philosophie des Seins (Potency and Act: Studies Toward a Philosophy of Being)) and her lectures. At this time, Josef Koch approached her to teach a class on phenomenology at the University of Breslau, but the arrangement fell through.

By October, she had sent copies of the manuscript to Honecker, Heidegger, and Husserl. In the following month, the committee acknowledged that her scholarship showed she was ready for a lectureship, but she was told not to formally apply because her application could not be accepted. Ultimately, her inability to secure a position in Breslau and Freiburg stemmed from economic hardship and anti-Jewish bias, as well as departmental politics.

=== Münster, 1932–1933 ===
The Law for the Restoration of the Professional Civil Service, which led Stein to step down from her teaching post in Münster

At the end of 1931, Stein was invited to be a lecturer at Münster's German Institute of Scientific Pedagogy, a Catholic teachers' college. She had been recruited by founder Maria Schmitz, chair of the Association of Catholic German Women Teachers, who was impressed by Stein's Salzburg lecture, The Ethos of Women's Professions. (Note: Das Ethos der Frauenberufe) Beginning her lectures in spring 1932, Stein continued pursuing a university chair by asking Conrad-Martius to critique her Habilitationsschrift, Potency and Act, while Honecker encouraged her to make contact with Catholic philosophers at the University of Münster. That April, while visiting Bavarian Radio in Munich, she met and befriended the Catholic writer Gertrud von le Fort, author of Die Letzte am Schafott, with whom she shared a bond over their conversions to Catholicism. Later that year, in September 1932, the Société Thomiste invited her to a conference on Phenomenology and Thomism in Juvisy. Designated the "Husserl expert", she was the sole woman at the conference and one of only five German attendees. She befriended philosopher Jacques Maritain and his wife, Raïssa, later attending one of their retreats in Meudon.

When the Law for the Restoration of the Professional Civil Service banned non-Aryans from public service on 7 April 1933, the institute's administration asked her to step down until the political issues were resolved, even though she wasn't a civil servant. That day, Stein visited Walzer to discuss traveling to Rome to petition Pope Pius XI for an encyclical. Walzer advised her to write a letter to the Pope urging him to condemn anti-Jewish actions, which Walzer forwarded with a supportive cover letter. The letter was received on April 20, but the Pope remained silent. Stein preemptively resigned on 20 April 1933; that same month, her mentor Husserl was dismissed from Freiburg.

== Carmelite vocation and martyrdom ==
=== Path to Carmel: Münster, Breslau, Cologne, April–October 1933 ===
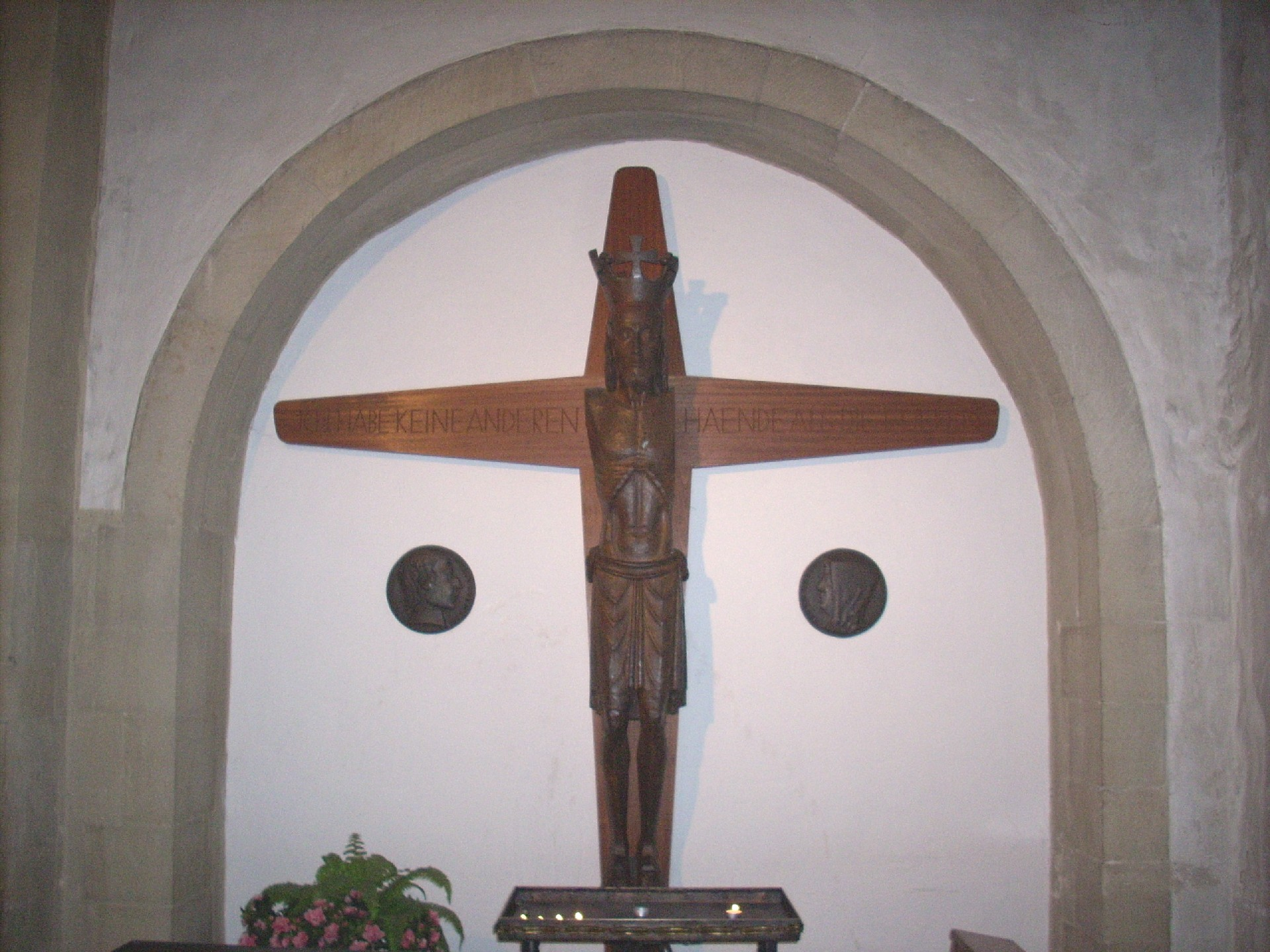
The former wooden triumphal crucifix inside St. Ludger's Church, where Stein prayed for 13 hours to understand her calling to become a Carmelite. (Note: Originally suspended in the chancel arch (Chorbogenkruzifix), the figure lost its arms in a September 1944 bombing raid and was mounted on a postwar cross inscribed Ich habe keine anderen Hände als die Euren ("I have no hands other than yours"). A wall plaque beneath it commemorates Stein.)

After Stein resigned, Schmitz continued paying her salary and suggested she stay in Münster to finish her scholarly work. Although offered a teaching post in South America, Stein believed she was called to take up the cross laid upon her people. After a thirteen-hour devotion at Münster's St. Ludger's Church on April 30, she felt assured the time had come to enter a Carmelite convent. (Note: Stein wrote that on April 30 when she was seeking assurance to enter the convent, she believed her mother would prefer her to remain in Germany rather than go to South America. When Stein told her, however, her mother said she would rather have seen Stein in South America.)

In May, Walzer granted permission, and Stein contacted Elisabeth Cosack, whom she had met at an October 1932 Aachen lecture and who had close ties to the Discalced Carmelite convent of Our Lady of Peace. When Stein visited Cologne, Cosack dismissed her concerns about her age of forty-one, Jewish ancestry, and lack of a dowry, noting places were opening as nuns left to found a Carmel near her hometown of Breslau. Cosack introduced her to prioress Josepha Wery and subprioress Teresia Renata Posselt, who asked her to return once the provincial arrived. After Stein wrote urging a prompt decision, the community summoned her back for an introduction to the chapter nuns and a canonical examination by the monastic commissary, Cathedral Dean Albert Lenné. He granted the required canonical dispensation, and the chapter sent its acceptance on June 20.

In July, Stein sent six crates of her books to Cologne and spent a month in the monastery's outer guesthouse, joining the community's daily schedule. She made a final visit to her family in Breslau from mid-August to early October. While there, she began Life in a Jewish Family, (Note: German: Aus dem Leben einer jüdischen Familie.) recording her family's history to challenge Nazi antisemitic propaganda and affirm the rootedness of German Jews. When she revealed she was entering a cloistered order rather than taking a new post, her mother reacted with shock and bitter opposition, seeing it as further estrangement from Judaism. After accompanying her mother to the synagogue one last time on October 12, her forty-second birthday and the final day of the Feast of Tabernacles, Stein returned to Cologne the next day.

=== Cologne Carmel, 1933–1938 ===
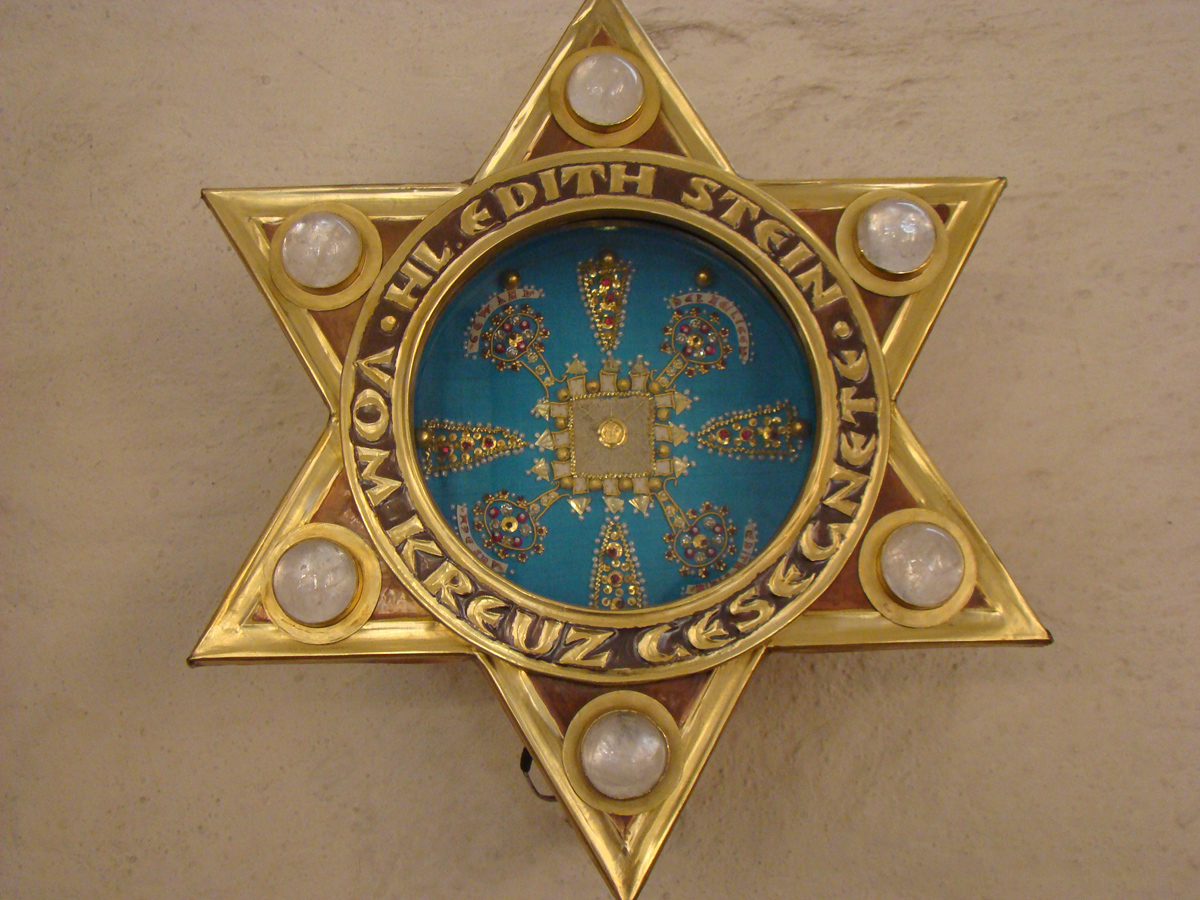
Relic of Teresa Benedicta's robe in the Cologne Cathedral with the inscription "St. Edith Stein – blessed by the Cross"

On 14 October 1933, after attending First Vespers for the feast of St. Teresa of Ávila, Stein crossed the enclosure grille of the monastery, joining the community's evening prayers for Compline and Matins that night. During her six-month postulancy, she embraced Thérèse of Lisieux's "Little Way", finding spiritual growth in humble domestic chores. She entered the novitiate and received the religious habit on 15 April 1934, wearing a white bridal dress provided by her sister Rosa. At her clothing ceremony she took the religious name Teresia Benedicta a Cruce (Teresa Benedicta of the Cross). During her retreat before receiving the habit, she meditated on John of the Cross's Dark Night.

As a postulant and young novice, Stein wrote biographies of St. Teresa of Ávila and the lay mystic Hieronymus Jaegen for the convent and Catholic publishers. With typing assistance from her friend Ruth Kantorowicz, Stein continued expanding Life in a Jewish Family in 1934 and early 1935. She also received visitors, including a two-hour talk across the parlor grille with le Fort in November 1934. Stein returned to John of the Cross's Dark Night during her retreat before making her temporary vows for three years on Easter Sunday, 21 April 1935. Although Stein had assumed entering Carmel meant renouncing intellectual work, the Carmelite Provincial, Theodor Rauch, directed her in May to resume scholarly writing.

In July 1935, she reworked Potency and Act, doubling its length into her philosophical magnum opus, Finite and Eternal Being. (Note: The full German title is Endliches und ewiges Sein: Versuch eines Aufstiegs zum Sinn des Seins (Finite and Eternal Being: An Attempt at an Ascent to the Meaning of Being).) Moving beyond a dialogue between phenomenology and Thomistic scholasticism, the metaphysical treatise on the meaning of being used the analogia entis to bridge finite existence and divine being through natural reason and Christian revelation. It served as an ontological counter-proposal to Heidegger's Being and Time. (Note: Sein und Zeit. Erste Hälfte: Die Interpretation des Daseins auf die Zeitlichkeit und die Explikation der Zeit als des transzendentalen Horizontes der Frage nach dem Sein (Being and Time. First Half: The Interpretation of Dasein in Terms of Temporality, and the Explication of Time as the Transcendental Horizon for the Question of Being).)

On the Feast of the Exaltation of the Cross, 14 September 1936, her mother died in Breslau, just at the time of the convent's annual renewal of vows, a special custom of the Carmelites. After their mother's death, Stein's sister Rosa moved to Cologne and was baptized on Christmas Eve 1936 at the chapel of St. Elisabeth Hospital in Cologne-Hohenlind. Stein watched from a wheelchair, as she was recovering from a fall in which she broke both a foot and a hand. She had less than two hours a day for writing due to her convent duties. Alongside caring for an elderly fellow sister, she was appointed turn sister in December 1937, an office that involved tending to the sisters' everyday needs, ordering supplies, looking after the extern sisters, and providing for the convent's guests. On 21 April 1938, Stein made her perpetual vows. She learned from their mutual friend, the Benedictine Adelgundis Jaegerschmid, who had been caring for him in Freiburg, that her former mentor Husserl died on April 27. On May 1, Stein received the black veil of a Carmelite with solemn vows.

Although disenfranchised under the 1935 Nuremberg Laws, Stein was driven to the polling station by election officials for the March 1936 Reichstag elections because local registries still listed her only as Catholic. During the April 1938 plebiscite, election officials brought a ballot box to the convent parlor and demanded a vote from every resident. Pressed to explain why Stein could not participate, Posselt, who was now the prioress, stated that Stein was "non-Aryan", a designation the officials recorded verbatim.

Days before the November 1938 pogroms, Stein identified her monastic calling with the biblical Esther, understanding her cloistered separation not as an abandonment of her people, but as a vocation to stand before God on their behalf. Whereas Esther risked her life before an earthly king to save her nation, Stein united her Jewish heritage with her Carmelite vocation to plead directly with God in vicarious atonement.

On December 18, she wrote the autobiographical essay How I Came to the Cologne Carmel (Note: Wie ich in den Kölner Karmel kam) at prioress Posselt's request, noting that the circumstances forcing her transfer echoed those surrounding her 1933 entrance. On 31 December 1938, accompanied by a physician who had offered to drive, Stein left Cologne for the Carmelite monastery in Echt in the Netherlands. On her way, they stopped in the former convent's Church of the Lady of Peace to receive a final blessing from the Queen of Peace.

=== Echt Carmel and martyrdom, 1938–1942 ===
Crossing the Dutch border on 31 December 1938, Stein lived the Carmelite convent in Echt, Netherlands, resuming community duties, including becoming turn sister and assistant to the portress, overseeing the refectory, and teaching the novices in Latin. She was joined there on 1 July 1939, by her sister Rosa, who served as an extern portress and entered the Third Order of Our Lady of Mount Carmel. That spring, Stein requested permission on March 26 to offer herself as a sacrifice of propitiation for true peace, and on June 9 drafted her Testament offering her life and death for the Church, peace, the Carmelite Order, Germany, and her family.

Drawing by Edith Stein left with her manuscript of Science of the Cross, 1942

Between January and April 1939, Stein completed her autobiography From a Jewish Family, and in 1941 she wrote Ways to Know God, (Note: Wege der Gotteserkenntnis: Die „Symbolische Theologie“ des Areopagiten und ihre sachlichen Voraussetzungen (Ways to Know God: The "Symbolic Theology" of Dionysius the Areopagite and Its Objective Presuppositions).) a study of Pseudo-Dionysius the Areopagite. Written during her final years amid Nazi persecution, her final work, The Science of the Cross, (Note: Kreuzeswissenschaft) examines the theology of John of the Cross, presenting self-surrender and redemptive suffering as paths to union with God and resilience amid loss. Drawing on her phenomenological training, Stein argued that this theology cannot be grasped solely through abstract study, but must be lived through personal trial.

Following the German invasion of the Netherlands in May 1940, occupation decrees in late 1941 stripped non-Aryan German emigrants of citizenship, declaring Edith and Rosa stateless and requiring them to register with the authorities. In response, Carmelite superiors sought in early 1942 to transfer both sisters to the Carmel in Le Pâquier, Switzerland, which voted unanimously on 5 July 1942 to admit Stein. Stein also appealed to Archbishop Johannes de Jong of Utrecht, who replied on 23 December 1941, expressing pain that the Church was powerless to protect baptized Jews from Nazi persecution.

During the night of 3–4 August 1942, the sisters were transferred via Roermond and Amersfoort to the Westerbork transit camp. Reunited with other Catholic-baptized Jews, Stein remained calm, cared for neglected children, and sent brief notes out of the camp describing her inner peace. On August 7, Transport #34 departed Westerbork with 987 deportees; passing Schifferstadt at midday, Stein handed a final written greeting to a railway official for friends in Speyer. The train arrived at Auschwitz-Birkenau on the evening of 8 August 1942, where Stein and Rosa were murdered. (Note: They are conventionally recorded as having died in the gas chambers on 9 August 1942, though postwar Dutch and International Tracing Service records indicate this date was an administrative presumption for untraced deportees, leaving open whether she died upon arrival or survived in labor details as late as 1943.)

== Philosophy ==
For Stein, phenomenology was an act of intellectual intuition providing cognitive access to essential structures and principles. Throughout her writings, she relied on rigorous phenomenological analysis, explicitly reaffirming in her magnum opus, Finite and Eternal Being, that Husserlian phenomenology remained her foundational philosophical language and framework. This commitment extended through her final work, The Science of the Cross. Rather than breaking with her earlier thought, the shifts across her academic, teaching, and Carmelite years deepened a single project: using this method to explore an objectively real world. In her mature synthesis, human consciousness intentionally constitutes the givenness of meaning, while God grounds the independent act of being.

== Veneration and legacy ==
Stained-glass window representing the martyrdom of Edith Stein at the Sacred Heart Church in Kassel, Germany, by Alois Plum (1983–84)

=== Canonization ===
Immediately after World War II, nuns of the Cologne Carmel began gathering documentation about Stein, including her letters. Posselt, now prioress, wrote a popular biography about her in 1947. Recognizing Stein's importance, Cardinal Joseph Frings, Archbishop of Cologne, sought special permission to open her canonization process in Cologne, as church protocol normally required causes to begin where the person died. Permission was granted in 1958. The process began in 1962, aiming to establish Stein's heroic virtue.

In 1980, Jakob Schlafke, Canon of Cologne Cathedral and vice postulator, published Nazi documents showing that hatred of the faith led to Stein's death, establishing her martyrdom. Cardinals Joseph Höffner of Cologne and Józef Glemp of Poland petitioned Pope John Paul II in 1983 to proceed with her cause as a martyr. Following simplified Vatican procedures introduced that same year, a 26 January 1987 decree promulgated her heroic virtue and martyrdom, confirming her as venerable.

On 1 May 1987, Pope John Paul II issued an apostolic letter in Cologne confirming her beatification. A decade later, in May 1997, he recognized a miracle attributed to Stein's intercession involving a three-year-old girl who recovered from a fatal dose of Tylenol after her parents prayed to her. Following the publication of the canonization decree in February 1998, the ceremony took place in St. Peter's Square that October.

==== Controversy surrounding canonization ====
Stein's canonization prompted debate, with scholars and Jewish critics questioning her designation as a Christian martyr, maintaining that it appropriates a Jewish tragedy, obscures historic Catholic antisemitism, and implies supersessionism, reframing the genocide as redemptive suffering. Critics argue that Stein did not die in defense of Catholic doctrine but as one Jewish victim among the millions murdered under Nazi ideology. Others note that she voluntarily converted to a faith whose history of antisemitism helped enable the Shoah; as an apostate, she cannot represent Jewish victims or turn a Jewish tragedy into Christian martyrdom. Stein's own theology of expiatory suffering, offering herself as atonement for what she called Jewish unbelief, further carries supersessionist overtones and conflicts with the Jewish rejection of vicarious atonement.

From the Catholic perspective, honoring Stein as a martyr and saint bridges Jewish and Christian heritage while ensuring the atrocities of the Shoah are never forgotten and fostering vigilance against future persecution. Church leaders and defenders of her canonization also emphasize that honoring Stein expresses solidarity with Jewish victims and confronts antisemitism, presenting her as a unifying figure who retained pride in her Jewish heritage and refused to be spared from the suffering of her people. As both a daughter of Israel and a Catholic saint, her elevation is seen as sanctifying Jewish martyrdom and affirming the ongoing validity of God's covenant with the Jewish people.

Beyond institutional debates, other scholars emphasize Stein's own efforts to define her identity rather than being reduced to either side's narrative. Although her conversion led some to exclude her as a German-Jewish figure, she resisted rigid labels, maintaining a continuity of self that honored her Jewish heritage alongside her Catholic commitments. Viewing her inner spiritual life as an empathetic bridge to others and to God, she cultivated a personal synthesis that resists strict categorization.

=== Patron Saint of Europe ===
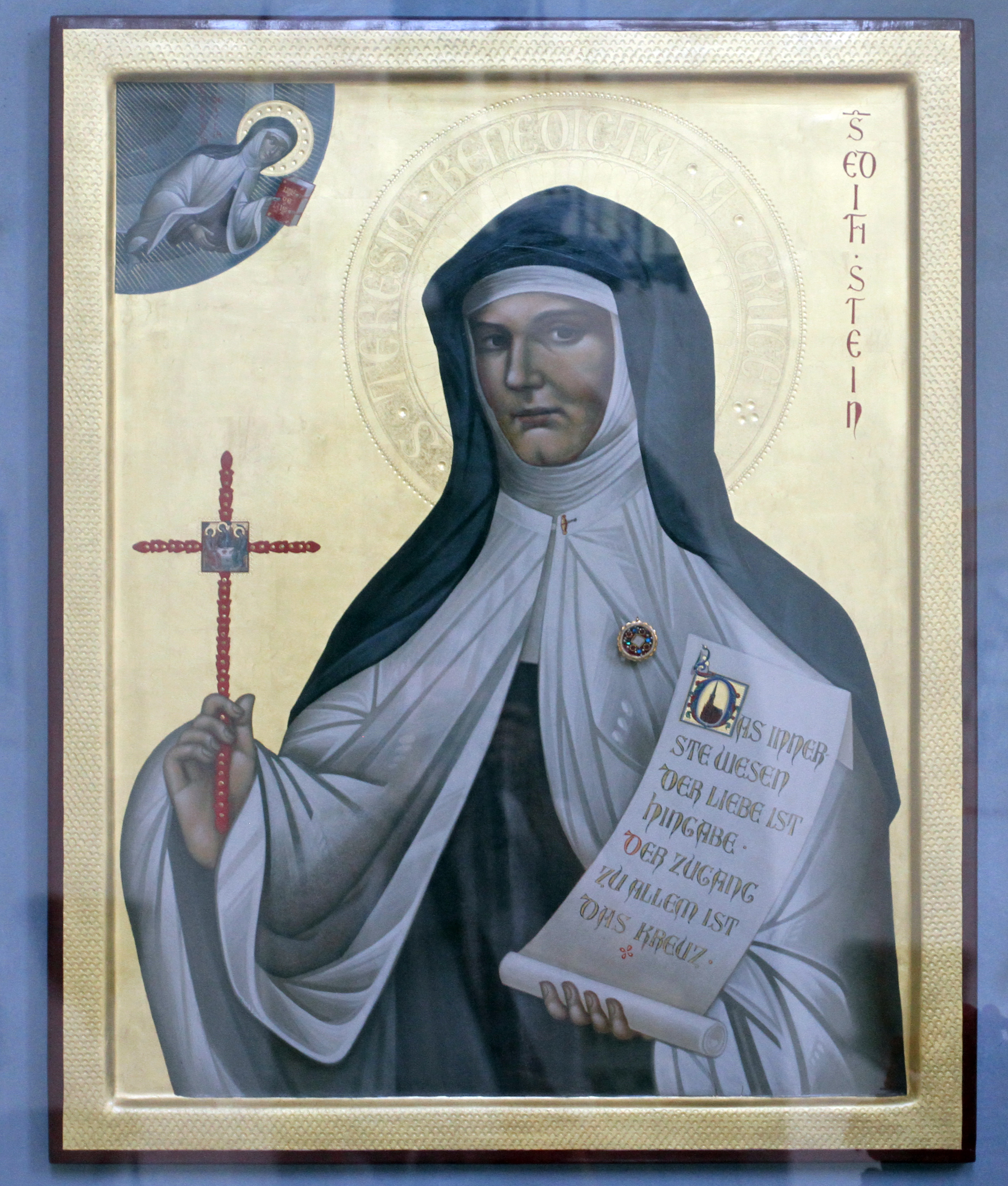
Icon in Stein's baptismal church, the Parish Church of St. Martin in Bad Bergzabern, by Gustav Makarius Tauc. The scroll shows a quote from her works: "The innermost essence of love is self-offering. The entryway to all things is the Cross"

On 1 October 1999, Pope John Paul II proclaimed Teresa Benedicta of the Cross, along with Catherine of Siena and Bridget of Sweden, patrons of Europe, joining the patrons Benedict of Nursia and Cyril and Methodius. Selecting these women underscored women's role in Europe, recognizing their dignity and gifts in the Church and society, while balancing the number of male and female patrons to reflect their contributions to European society. The pope specifically cited Stein's advocacy for women's social status and exploration of their secular and religious missions. He emphasized that Stein's violent death alongside her Jewish people expresses solidarity with human suffering as an innocent victim and serves as a protest against every violation of the fundamental rights of the person. Through this proclamation, he intended to foster mutual respect and unity across religious, ethnic, and cultural divides.

=== Doctor of the Church petition ===
In April 2024, the superior general of the Discalced Carmelites, Miguel Márquez Calle, petitioned Pope Francis to declare Stein a Doctor of the Church (Doctor Ecclesiae), proposing the specific title doctor veritatis ("teacher of the truth"). The petition followed documentation gathered by an international committee commissioned by the order in 2022 on the 100th anniversary of Stein's baptism and the 80th anniversary of her martyrdom. On June 10, 2024, however, the Dicastery for the Causes of Saints announced that Pope Francis had provisionally declined to open the formal procedure to elevate her. The Carmelites intend to resubmit the case.

Stein's case could be considered because the Dicastery for the Causes of Saints concluded in the 2010s that martyrdom, historically a procedural bar to becoming a Doctor of the Church, can attest to the truth of a saint's doctrine. Instead, the central question is whether her writings demonstrate "eminent doctrine" (eminens doctrina): work that deepens theology, develops Christian thought, and exerts a lasting influence on the Church's spiritual life. Commentators have questioned whether Stein's writings offer original insights, arguing that she primarily synthesized the thoughts of others or noting that her biblical exegesis is weaker than her philosophy. Scholars also observe that many Doctors waited centuries to be named, and that too little time has passed since Stein's death to show the lasting impact of her teachings.

Proponents contend that Stein's writings form a coherent whole directed toward the mystery of God (reductio ad mysterium), uniting rational inquiry with personal sacrifice. They suggest that she bridges the Old and New Testaments, integrates phenomenology with Thomistic metaphysics and the "science of the cross" (scientia Crucis), and develops a concrete anthropology exploring the spiritual dimension of the body, gender complementarity, and meaning in history. In his 1998 encyclical Fides et Ratio, Pope John Paul II, whose theological approach aligned with Stein's, included her as the only woman among the Christian thinkers who united philosophy and theology.

== Sources ==
=== Books ===
- Allen, Prudence (2018). "The Passion of Edith Stein—Revisited". In Haney, Kathleen (ed.). Listening to Edith Stein: Wisdom for a New Century (PDF). ICS Publications. pp. 47–87. ISBN 978-1-939272-45-4. Archived from the original (PDF) on 11 July 2019 – via Dicastery for Laity Family and Life.
- Andrews, Michael F. (2022). "Edith Stein's Understanding of the Personal Attitude: Applications and Implications for a New Ethics". In Andrews, Michael F.; Calcagno, Antonio (eds.). Ethics and Metaphysics in the Philosophy of Edith Stein: Applications and Implications. Springer. pp. 225–239. doi:10.1007/978-3-030-91198-0_17. ISBN 978-3-030-91197-3.
- Bahne, Thomas (2014). "Zur philosophischen Biographie Edith Steins" [On the Philosophical Biography of Edith Stein]. Person und Kommunikation: Anstöße zur Erneuerung einer christlichen Tugendethik bei Edith Stein [Person and Communication: Impulses for the Renewal of a Christian Virtue Ethics in Edith Stein] (in German). Brill Schöningh. pp. 35–53. doi:10.30965/9783657766598. ISBN 978-3-506-76659-5.
- Baseheart, Mary Catherine (1997). Person in the World: Introduction to the Philosophy of Edith Stein. Springer. ISBN 9789401725668. OCLC 851372124.
- Banki, Judith Hershcopf (1994). "Some Reflections on Edith Stein". In Cargas, Harry James (ed.). The Unnecessary Problem of Edith Stein. Lanham, Md.: University Press of America. pp. 43–50. ISBN 0-8191-8781-X. OCLC 30811974.
- Batzdorff, Susanne (1994). "Witnessing My Aunt's Beatification". In Cargas, Harry James (ed.). The Unnecessary Problem of Edith Stein. Lanham, Md.: University Press of America. pp. 33–42. ISBN 0-8191-8781-X. OCLC 30811974.
- Batzdorff, Susanne (1998). "Life in a Jewish Family: Aunt Edith's Legacy to Her Descendants". In Herbstrith, Waltraud (ed.). Never Forget: Christian and Jewish Perspectives on Edith Stein. Translated by Batzdorff, Susanne. ICS Publications. pp. 29–48. ISBN 0-935216-62-6. OCLC 30811974.
- Berger, Teresa (2025). "Dr. Edith Stein – St. Teresa Benedicta of the Cross: Continuities and Conflicts in a Scholarly Life". In Huian, Georgiana; Moser, Erika; Kostrešević, Milan; Bürgin, Martin (eds.). Konflikt und Kontinuität: Religiöse Biographien im 19. und 20. Jahrhundert. Vandenhoeck & Ruprecht. pp. 43–56. doi:10.13109/9783666500640.43. ISBN 978-3-525-50064-4.
- Berkman, Joyce Avrech (2006). "The Intellectual Passion of Edith Stein: A Biographical Profile". In Berkman, Joyce Avrech (ed.). Contemplating Edith Stein. University of Notre Dame Press. pp. 15–47. ISBN 0268021880. OCLC 62509085.
- Berkman, Joyce Avrech (2006). "The German-Jewish Symbiosis in Flux: Edith Stein's Complex National/Ethnic Identity". In Berkman, Joyce Avrech (ed.). Contemplating Edith Stein. University of Notre Dame Press. pp. 170–198. ISBN 0268021880. OCLC 62509085.
- Borden, Sarah (2003). Edith Stein. Continuum. ISBN 9780826452627. OCLC 1568050004.
- Brenner, Rachel Feldhay (1994). "Ethical Convergence in Religious Conversion". In Cargas, Harry James (ed.). The Unnecessary Problem of Edith Stein. Lanham, Md.: University Press of America. pp. 77–102. ISBN 0-8191-8781-X. OCLC 30811974.
- Brenner, Rachel Feldhay (2006). "Edith Stein: A Reading of Her Feminist Thought". In Berkman, Joyce Avrech (ed.). Contemplating Edith Stein. University of Notre Dame Press. pp. 212–225. ISBN 0-268-02189-9. OCLC 62509085.
- Brough, John B. (2012) [1991]. "Translator's Introduction". On the Phenomenology of the Consciousness of Internal Time (1893–1917). By Husserl, Edmund. Translated by Brough, John B. Springer. ISBN 9789401137188. OCLC 851373266.
- Burns, Timothy A. (2024). Edith Stein's 'On the Problem of Empathy': A Companion. Lexington Books. ISBN 9781666937169. OCLC 1443769397.
- Burns, Timothy A.; Lacy, Travis; Mohr, Eric J. (2026). "Introduction: Why Put Edith Stein and Max Scheler into Dialogue?". In Burns, Timothy A.; Lacy, Travis; Mohr, Eric J. (eds.). Edith Stein and Max Scheler in Dialogue (ebook). Bloomsbury. ISBN 9781978771970. OCLC 1568050004.
- Calcagno, Antonio (2006). "Assistant and/or Collaborator? Edith Stein's Relationship to Husserl's Ideen II". In Berkman, Joyce Avrech (ed.). Contemplating Edith Stein. University of Notre Dame Press. pp. 243–270. ISBN 0268021880. OCLC 62509085.
- Calcagno, Antonio; Miron, Ronny (2022). "Introduction". In Calcagno, Antonio; Miron, Ronny (eds.). Hedwig Conrad-Martius and Edith Stein: Philosophical Encounters and Divides. Springer. pp. 1–12. ISBN 978-3-031-14758-6. OCLC 1347737136.
- Gelber, L.; Leuven, Romaeus, eds. (1986) [1939]. "Chronology 1916–1942". Life in a Jewish Family 1891–1916: An Autobiography by Stein, Edith. Translated by Koeppel, Josephine. ICS Publications. ISBN 0-935216-04-9. OCLC 1043671210.
- Feldes, Joachim (2015). "A Yet Hidden Story: Edith Stein and the Bergzabern Circle". In Lebech, Mette; Gurmin, John Haydn (eds.). Intersubjectivity, Humanity, Being: Edith Stein's Phenomenology and Christian Philosophy. Peter Lang. pp. 125–138. ISBN 978-3-0343-1980-5. Archived from the original on 29 January 2023.
- Fisher, Eugene (1994). "A Response to Daniel Polish". In Cargas, Harry James (ed.). The Unnecessary Problem of Edith Stein. Lanham, Md.: University Press of America. pp. 17–22. ISBN 0-8191-8781-X. OCLC 30811974.
- Gerl-Falkovitz, Hanna-Barbara (2006). ""His Whole Life Consisted of a Search for Religious Truth": Edith Stein in Conversation with John Henry Newman". In Berkman, Joyce Avrech (ed.). Contemplating Edith Stein. University of Notre Dame Press. pp. 149–169. ISBN 0-268-02188-0.
- Garber, Zev (1994). "Jewish Perspectives on Edith Stein's Martyrdom". In Cargas, Harry James (ed.). The Unnecessary Problem of Edith Stein. Lanham, Md.: University Press of America. pp. 61–76. ISBN 0-8191-8781-X. OCLC 30811974.
- Gonzales, Philip (2016). "Analogia Entis and Creatureliness: Stein and Przywara's Refutation of Heidegger". In Machnacz, J.; Małek-Orłowska, M.; Krzysztof, S. (eds.). Hut und Schleier: Die Phänomenologie Edith Steins [The Hat and the Veil: The Phenomenology of Edith Stein]. Traugott Bautz Verlag. pp. 119–137. ISBN 978-3-95948-164-9.
- Graef, Hilda C. (1955). The Scholar and the Cross: The Life and Work of Edith Stein. Newman Press – via Internet Archive.
- Gricoski, Thomas (2024). "Foreword to the ICS Edition". Finite and Eternal Being: An Attempt to Ascend to the Meaning of Being. By Stein, Edith. The Catholic University of America Press. pp. xiii–xxvii. ISBN 978-1-939272-91-1. OCLC 1363814294.
- Herbstrith, Waltraud (1985). Edith Stein: A Biography. Translated by Bonowitz, Bernard. Harper & Row. ISBN 0060638710. OCLC 1033567738 – via Internet Archive.
- Heffernan, George (2022). "Stein's Critique of Heidegger on Temporality, Eternity, and Transcendence—With Special Attention to Conrad-Martius's Contribution". In Calcagno, Antonio; Miron, Ronny (eds.). Hedwig Conrad-Martius and Edith Stein: Philosophical Encounters and Divides. Springer. pp. 105–132. ISBN 978-3-031-14758-6. OCLC 1347737136.
- Hunt, Hugh Candler (2015). Introduction. Edith Stein Letters to Roman Ingarden. By Stein, Edith. Translated by Hunt, Hugh Candler. ICS Publications. ISBN 9781939272317. OCLC 1036517407.
- Kavanaugh, Kieran (2002). "I.C.S. Introduction". The Science of the Cross. By Stein, Edith. ICS Publications. pp. xi–xxxvii. ISBN 978-0-935216-31-8. OCLC 49894884.
- Koeppel, Josephine (1990). Edith Stein: Philosopher and Mystic. Liturgical Press. ISBN 0814656250. OCLC 1310588592 – via Internet Archive.
- Moran, Dermot (2017a). "Edith Stein's Encounter with Edmund Husserl and Her Phenomenology of the Person". In Magrī, Elisa; Moran, Dermot (eds.). Empathy, Sociality, and Personhood: Essays on Edith Stein's Phenomenological Investigations. Contributions to Phenomenology. Vol. 94. Cham: Springer. pp. 31–47. doi:10.1007/978-3-319-71096-9_3. ISBN 978-3-319-71095-2.
- Moran, Dermot (2017b). "Edith Stein's Encounter with Edmund Husserl and Her Phenomenology of the Person" (PDF). In Magrì, Elisa; Moran, Dermot (eds.). Empathy, Sociality, and Personhood: Essays on Edith Stein's Phenomenological Investigations. Springer. ISBN 978-3-319-71095-2. OCLC 1006452074. Archived (PDF) from the original on 16 October 2026 – via dermotmoran.com.
- Dupuis, Michel (2016). "University as a Philosophical Problem: Edith Stein and Karl Jaspers". In Machnacz, Jerzy; Małek-Orłowska, Monika; Serafin, Krzysztof (eds.). The Hat and the Veil – Hut und Schleier: The Phenomenology of Edith Stein – Die Phänomenologie Edith Steins. Verlag Traugott Bautz. pp. 215–225. ISBN 978-3-95948-063-5.
- Luther, A. R. (1972). Persons in Love: A Study of Max Scheler's Wesen und Formen der Sympathie. Springer. ISBN 978-90-247-1292-2. OCLC 534170.
- MacIntyre, Alasdair (2007). Edith Stein: A Philosophical Prologue. Continuum. ISBN 9781441166593. OCLC 746790934.
- Miron, Ronny (2023). Hedwig Conrad-Martius: The Phenomenological Gateway to Reality. Springer. ISBN 978-3-031-25415-4. OCLC 1229148052.
- Sawicki, Marianne (1997). Body, Text, and Science: The Literacy of Investigative Practices and the Phenomenology of Edith Stein. Springer. ISBN 978-1-4020-0262-5. OCLC 37426453.
- Neyer, M. Amata (2005). Foreword. Edith Stein: The Life of a Philosopher and Carmelite. By Posselt, Teresia Renata. Batzdorff, Susanne M.; Koeppel, Josephine; Sullivan, John (eds.). ICS Publications. pp. vii–xi. ISBN 978-0-935216-36-3. OCLC 56420078.
- Papa, Joseph T. (2026). Edith Stein's Freedom and Grace: A Companion. Bloomsbury Publishing. ISBN 9781978767843. OCLC 1579207244.
- Payne, Steven (2000). "Foreword to the ICS Edition". Knowledge and Faith. By Stein, Edith. Gelber, L.; Linssen, Michael (eds.). Translated by Redmond, Walter. ICS Publications. pp. xi–xvii. ISBN 0-935216-71-5. OCLC 1484684272.
- Posselt, Teresia Renata (2005) [1952]. Edith Stein. Translated by Hastings, Cecily; Nicholl, Donald. ICS Publications. OCLC 1148964689 – via Internet Archive.
- von Renteln, Angelika (2006). "Moments in Edith Stein's Years of Crisis, 1918–1922". In Berkman, Joyce Avrech (ed.). Contemplating Edith Stein. Translated by Calcagno, Anthony. University of Notre Dame Press. pp. 134–148. ISBN 0268021880. OCLC 62509085.
- Rojcewicz, Richard; Schuwer, André (1996) [1989]. "Translator's Introduction". Ideas Pertaining to a Pure Phenomenology and to a Phenomenological Philosophy: Second Book. By Husserl, Edmund. Translated by Rojcewicz, Richard; Schuwer, André. Kluwer Academic Publishers. ISBN 9780792300113. OCLC 769326226.
- Sawicki, Marianne (2000). "Editor's Introduction". Philosophy of Psychology and the Humanities. By Stein, Edith. Sawicki, Marianne (ed.). Translated by Baseheart, Mary Catherine. ICS Publications. ISBN 0935216731. OCLC 76428333.
- Sawicki, Marianne (2006). "Editor's Introduction". An Investigation Concerning the State. By Edith, Stein. Sawicki, Marianne (ed.). ICS Publications. ISBN 9781939272355. OCLC 974378304.
- Sobrak-Seaton, Michael (2024). Edith Stein's Phenomenological Metaphysics. Washington, D.C.: The Catholic University of America Press. ISBN 978-0-8132-3842-5.
- Spiegelberg, Herbert (1960). The Phenomenological Movement: A Historical Introduction. Springer. ISBN 978-94-017-5650-1. OCLC 1066187061.
- Sepp, Hans Rainer (2009). "The German Editor's Introduction". Potency and Act: Studies Toward a Philosophy of Being. By Stein, Edith. Gelber, L.; Leuven, Romaeus (eds.). Translated by Redmond, Walter. ICS Publications. pp. xiii–xlix. ISBN 978-0-935216-48-6.
- Spector, Scott (2006). "Edith Stein's Passing Gestures: Intimate Histories, Empathic Portraits". In Berkman, Joyce Avrech (ed.). Contemplating Edith Stein. University of Notre Dame Press. pp. 93–121. ISBN 978-0-268-02189-4. OCLC 62509085.
- Stein, Waltraut (1989) [1964]. "Preface to the First and Second Editions". On the Problem of Empathy. By Stein, Edith. Translated by Stein, Waltraut. ICS Publications. ISBN 9780935216110. OCLC 19324020.
- Stefanello, Eugenia (2026). Empathy and Deliberation: The Case for a Phenomenological Approach. Value Inquiry Book Series. Vol. 421. Leiden: Brill. doi:10.1163/9789004745360. ISBN 978-90-04-74535-3.
- Tanay, Emanuel (1994). "A Catholic Jew". In Cargas, Harry James (ed.). The Unnecessary Problem of Edith Stein. Lanham, Md.: University Press of America. pp. 27–32. ISBN 0-8191-8781-X. OCLC 30811974.
- Tooney, James (2025). "Introduction". In Auer, Marietta; Miller, Paul B; Smith, Henry E.; Tooney, James (eds.). Reinach and the Foundations of Private Law. Cambridge University Press. pp. 1–20. doi:10.1017/9781009446013.001.
- Sullivan, John (1998). "The Path to Beatification". In Herbstrith, Waltraud (ed.). Never Forget: Christian and Jewish Perspectives on Edith Stein. Translated by Batzdorff, Susanne. ICS Publications. pp. 7–14. ISBN 978-0-935216-62-2. OCLC 37902335.
- Sullivan, John J. (2016). "Role for Edith Stein in Her Own Promotion?". In Calcagno, Antonio (ed.). Edith Stein: Women, Social-Political Philosophy, Theology, Metaphysics and Public History. Springer. pp. 273–282. doi:10.1007/978-3-319-21124-4_22. ISBN 978-3-319-21123-7.
- Woodward, Kenneth L. (1996). Making Saints: How the Catholic Church Determines Who Becomes a Saint, Who Doesn't, and Why. Touchstone. ISBN 978-0-684-81530-5. OCLC 22113209.

=== Journals, yearbooks, and dissertations ===
Adamczyk-Enriquez, Malgorzata (2026). "From Phenomenological Method to Metaphysical Grounding in Edith Stein". American Catholic Philosophical Quarterly. 100 (2): 329–352.

- Galvani, Martina (2022). "Moral Interiority and Self-Realization: The Relationship Between Good and Being in Edith Stein's Metaphysics". In Andrews, Michael F.; Calcagno, Antonio (eds.). Ethics and Metaphysics in the Philosophy of Edith Stein: Applications and Implications. Women in the History of Philosophy and Sciences. Vol. 12. Cham: Springer. pp. 121–132. doi:10.1007/978-3-030-91198-0_9. ISBN 978-3-030-91197-3.
- Alfieri, Francesco (2008). "Hedwig Conrad-Martius: A philosophical heredity, Illustrated by E. Avé-Lallemant". Axiomathes. 18: 515–531. doi:10.1007/s10516-008-9044-1.
- Beauvais, Chantal (2005). "Edith Stein et Erich Przywara: la réconciliation du noétique et de l'ontique" [Edith Stein and Erich Przywara: The Reconciliation of the Noetic and the Ontic]. Laval théologique et philosophique (in French). 61 (2): 319–335. doi:10.7202/011821ar.
- Beckmann-Zöller, Beate (2018). "Bedeutung von Leben und Werk Edith Steins für die Gegenwart" [The Significance of Edith Stein's Life and Work for the Present] (PDF). Edith-Stein-Jahrbuch (in German). 24: 9–24. Archived from the original (PDF) on 1 November 2026 – via Teresianischer Karmel in Deutschland.
- Beckmann-Zöller, Beate (2019). "Edith Stein in Köln – die vom Kreuz gesegnete Braut Christi (1933–1938)" [Edith Stein in Cologne – The Bride of Christ Blessed by the Cross (1933–1938)] (PDF). Edith-Stein-Jahrbuch (in German). 25: 42–45. Archived (PDF) from the original on 19 July 2026.
- Beckmann-Zöller, Beate (2021). "Edith Steins Bekehrung und der wahre Hintergrund zur Autobiographie Teresas von Ávila" [Edith Stein’s Conversion and the True Background to the Autobiography of Teresa of Ávila] (PDF). Edith-Stein-Jahrbuch. 27: 23–40. Archived from the original (PDF) on 2 December 2025 – via Teresianischer Karmel in Deutschland.
- Bednář, Václav (2004). "Okolnosti pobytu Edith Steinové v Hranicích v roce 1915" [Circumstances of Edith Stein's Stay in Hranice in 1915] (PDF). Sborník Státního okresního archivu v Přerově [Collection of the State District Archive in Přerov] (in Czech): 114–131. Archived from the original (PDF) on 15 December 2024.
- Berkman, Joyce Avrech (2016). "Esther and Mary: The Uneasy Jewish/Catholic Dynamic in the Work and Life of Edith Stein". Journal of Feminist Studies in Religion. 32 (1): 55–73. doi:10.2979/jfemistudreli.32.1.05. JSTOR 10.2979/jfemistudreli.32.1.05.
- Cardoso, Carolina de Resende Damas; Massimi, Marina (2017). "Diálogo entre Edith Stein e William Stern. Pessoa como fundamento da Psicologia" [Dialogue between Edith Stein and William Stern: The person as the foundation of Psychology]. Revista De Filosofia Aurora (in Brazilian Portuguese). 29 (48): 865–886. doi:10.7213/1980-5934.29.048.DS09.
- Dobhan, Ulrich (2004). "Edith-Stein-Bibliographie 2000–2003" (PDF). Edith-Stein-Jahrbuch (in German). 10. with assistance from Beckmann-Zöller, B., Beltrán, A., Feldes, J., Füllenbach, E. H., Körner, R., Neyer, M. A., Scriba, E., and Strehle, A.: 241–252. Archived from the original (PDF) on 1 September 2020 – via Teresianischer Karmel in Deutschland.
- Dobhan, Ulrich (2006). "Edith Stein – die Karmelitin" [Edith Stein – The Carmelite] (PDF). Edith-Stein-Jahrbuch (in German). 12: 75–123. Archived (PDF) from the original on 19 July 2026.
- Espín, Oliva M. (2008). ""The Destiny of This People Is My Own…": Edith Stein's Paradoxical Sainthood". CrossCurrents. 58 (1): 117–148. doi:10.1353/cro.2008.a782406.
- Feldes, Joachim (2004). "Der Beginn einer Karriere: Edith Steins Referat "Wahrheit und Klarheit" und seine Auswirkungen auf ihren Lebensweg nach 1926" [The Beginning of a Career: Edith Stein's Lecture "Truth and Clarity" and Its Impact on Her Life Path after 1926] (PDF). Edith-Stein-Jahrbuch (in German). 10: 193–202. Archived from the original (PDF) on 1 September 2020 – via Teresianischer Karmel in Deutschland.
- Feldes, Joachim (2007). ""Oh, diese Philosophin!": Joseph Schwind als geistlicher Begleiter Edith Steins" ["Oh, This Philosopher!": Joseph Schwind as Edith Stein's Spiritual Companion] (PDF). Edith-Stein-Jahrbuch (in German). 13: 49–76. Archived from the original (PDF) on 2 September 2020 – via Teresianischer Karmel in Deutschland.
- Feldes, Joachim (2013). Das Phänomenologenheim Der Bergzaberner Kreis im Kontext der frühen phänomenologischen Bewegung [The Phenomenological Home: The Bergzabern Circle in the Context of the Early Phenomenological Movement.] (PhD) (in German). Charles University. Archived from the original on 13 April 2026.
- Feldes, Joachim (2022). "Edith Steins Umgang mit Krisen – Phänomenologie, Gemeinschaft und Glaube" [Edith Stein's Way of Dealing with Crises – Phenomenology, Fellowship, and Faith]. Revista Portuguesa de Filosofia (in German). 78 (1/2): 361–380. JSTOR 10.2307/27160368.
- Feldes, Joachim (2023). "Hinter der Ikone – Türen zu Edith Steins Bergzabern" [Behind the Icon – Doors to Edith Stein's Bergzabern] (PDF). Edith-Stein-Jahrbuch (in German). 29: 81–91. Archived from the original (PDF) on 2 December 2024 – via Teresianischer Karmel in Deutschland.
- Gerl-Falkovitz, Hanna-Barbara (2020). "„Die ewige Frau". Gertrud von le Forts Blick auf Edith Stein" ["The Eternal Woman": Gertrud von le Fort's View of Edith Stein] (PDF). Edith-Stein-Jahrbuch (in German). 26: 161–172. Archived (PDF) from the original on 19 July 2026.
- Guerrero van der Meijden, Jadwiga (2023). "Doctor Crucis: The Criteria for Conferral of the Title of Doctor of the Church and Their Application to the Case of Edith Stein. Part I". The Person and the Challenges. 13 (1): 131–149. doi:10.15633/pch.13109. Archived from the original on 9 November 2026.
- Guerrero van der Meijden, Jadwiga (2023). "Doctor Crucis: The Criteria for Conferral of the Title of Doctor of the Church and Their Application to the Case of Edith Stein. Part II". The Person and the Challenges. 13 (2): 133–150. doi:10.15633/pch.13208. Archived from the original on 12 September 2024.
- Hughes, John (1985). "Edith Stein's doctoral thesis on empathy and the philosophical climate from which it emerged". Theresianum. 36 (2): 455–484.
- Ingarden, Roman (1962). "Edith Stein on her activity as an assistant of Edmund Husserl". Philosophy and Phenomenological Research. 23 (2): 155–175. JSTOR 2104910.
- Hanebrink, Paul (2018). "An Anti-totalitarian Saint: The Canonization of Edith Stein". Journal of the History of Ideas. 79 (3): 481–495. doi:10.1353/jhi.2018.0026.
- Kerremans, Ilse (2017). "»Wo immer meines Lebens Straße geht, / Bist Du bei mir, / Nichts kann von Deiner Liebe je mich scheiden.« Edith Stein und ihre Schwester Rosa in Echt" ["Wherever My Life's Road Goes, You Are with Me, Nothing Can Ever Separate Me from Your Love": Edith Stein and Her Sister Rosa in Echt] (PDF). Edith-Stein-Jahrbuch (in German). 23: 84–98. Archived from the original (PDF) on 1 September 2020 – via Teresianischer Karmel in Deutschland.
- Krabbel, Gerta (2023) [1949]. "Edith Stein (1949)" (PDF). Edith-Stein-Jahrbuch (in German). 29: 25–65. Archived from the original (PDF) on 2 December 2024 – via Teresianischer Karmel in Deutschland.
- Latta, Jennie Davidson (2014). Being and Person: An Introduction to Edith Stein's Finite and Eternal Being (PhD thesis). The University of Memphis. Archived from the original on 26 April 2024.
- Muñoz Arranz, Milagros María (2021). "Edith Stein (1891-1942): política y educación como herramientas de cambio social en favor de la mujer en los inicios del siglo xx" [Edith Stein (1891-1942): Politics and Education as Tools for Social Change in Favor of Women in the Early 20th Century]. Cuadernos de Pensamiento (in Spanish). 34: 81–108. doi:10.51743/CPE.228.
- Neugebauer, Klaus (2011). "Dasein und ewiges Sein: Wie Edith Stein Martin Heidegger liest" [Dasein and Eternal Being: How Edith Stein Reads Martin Heidegger]. Perspektiven der Philosophie: Neues Jahrbuch (in German). 37. Amsterdam: Rodopi: 197–214. doi:10.1163/9789401207188_012. ISSN 0171-1288.
- Neyer, M. Amata (2004). "Der Brief Edith Steins an Papst Pius XI.: Versuch einer Dokumentation" [Edith Stein's Letter to Pope Pius XI: An Attempt at Documentation] (PDF). Edith-Stein-Jahrbuch (in German). 10: 11–29. Archived from the original (PDF) on 1 September 2020 – via Teresianischer Karmel in Deutschland.
- Nota, John H. (1987). "Misunderstanding and Insight about Edith Stein's Philosophy". Human Studies. 10 (2): 205–212. doi:10.1007/BF00142759.
- Ott, Hugo (1987). "Edith Stein (1891–1942) und Freiburg: Ein Beitrag anläßlich der Seligsprechung am 1. Mai 1987" [Edith Stein (1891–1942) and Freiburg: A Contribution on the Occasion of her Beatification on 1 May 1987] (PDF). Freiburger Diözesan-Archiv (in German). 107: 253–274. Archived (PDF) from the original on 9 November 2026.
- Ott, Hugo (1993). "Edith Stein und Freiburg". In Fetz, Reto Luzius; Rath, Matthias; Schulz, Peter (eds.). Studien zur Philosophie von Edith Stein: Internationales Edith-Stein-Symposion Eichstätt 1991 (in German). Alber. pp. 107–139. ISBN 3-495-47765-9. JSTOR 24360356.
- Paolinelli, Marco (2021). "Edith Stein: nel mondo, al servizio del Signore" [Edith Stein: In the World, in the Service of the Lord]. Teresianum (in Italian). 72 (2): 329–365. doi:10.1484/J.TER.5.128611.
- Parsons, Judith (2005). Edith Stein: Toward an Ethic of Relationship and Responsibility (PhD diss.). Duquesne University.
- Pezzella, Maria Anna (2021). "Phenomenology and psychology: Edith Stein's contribution to the investigation of the psyche". Symposium. 25 (10). Translated by Calcagno, Antonio: 17–30. doi:10.5840/symposium202125213.
- Polish, Daniel (1994). "A Painful Legacy". In Cargas, Harry James (ed.). The Unnecessary Problem of Edith Stein. Lanham, Md.: University Press of America. pp. 13–16. ISBN 0-8191-8781-X. OCLC 30811974.
- Polish, Daniel (1994). "Reply to Eugene Fisher". In Cargas, Harry James (ed.). The Unnecessary Problem of Edith Stein. Lanham, Md.: University Press of America. pp. 23–26. ISBN 0-8191-8781-X. OCLC 30811974.
- Rybińska, Agata (2014). "Niemcy czy Żydzi? Wrocławskie środowisko Edyty Stein" [Jews or Germans? The Breslau Cultural Background of Edith Stein]. Zeszyty Naukowe Centrum Badań Im. Edyty Stein (in Polish). 11: 157–167. doi:10.14746/cbes.2014.11.14.
- de la Sagrada Familia, Simeón (2005). "Santa Teresa Benedicta de la Cruz (Edith Stein): Historia de su Causa de Beatificación y Canonización" [Saint Teresa Benedicta of the Cross (Edith Stein): History of her Cause of Beatification and Canonization] (PDF). Monte Carmelo (in Spanish). 113 (2–3): 507–560. Archived from the original (PDF) on 12 November 2026.
- Schandl, Felix M. (2006). "Gewaltexzeß und Glaubenskraft: Edith Stein, Gertrud von le Fort und die "Gespräche der Karmelitinnen" von Compiègne" [Act of Violence and Power of Faith: Edith Stein, Gertrud von le Fort, and the "Dialogues of the Carmelites" of Compiègne]. Theologie und Philosophie (in German). 81 (1): 76–92.
- Sancho Fermín, Francisco Javier (1999). "Edith Stein carmelita: ambiente y espiritualidad" (PDF). Teresianum (in Spanish). 50 (1–2): 195–212. ISSN 0392-4556.
- Scerri, Carl (2025). "Erich Przywara and Edith Stein: A Dissimilarity within Similarity". Modern Theology. 41 (2): 249–293. doi:10.1111/moth.12957.
- Schippenkötter, Sebastian (2025). "Ein Schlüssel zu Edith Steins Biografie. Ihre «eigentliche» Stellungnahme zum nationalsozialistischen Kampf gegen Judentum und Christentum" [A Key to Edith Stein's Biography: Her "Authentic" Stance on the National Socialist Struggle against Judaism and Christianity]. Steiniana (in German). 10 (1): 11–40. doi:10.7764/Steiniana.10.1.2025.2.
- Seifert, Katharina (2014). "Edith Stein – die "Virgo sapiens" in Beuron – 1928–1933" [Edith Stein – The "Virgo sapiens" in Beuron – 1928–1933] (PDF). Edith-Stein-Jahrbuch (in German). 20: 14–26. Archived from the original (PDF) on 2 September 2020 – via Teresianischer Karmel in Deutschland.
- Schmidt, Rainer (2022). "Zum Tod der hl. Edith Stein im KZ Auschwitz-Birkenau" [On the Death of St. Edith Stein in the Auschwitz-Birkenau Concentration Camp] (PDF). Edith-Stein-Jahrbuch (in German). 28: 48–71. ISBN 978-3-429-05740-4. Archived from the original (PDF) on 9 July 2025 – via Teresianischer Karmel in Deutschland.
- Schmitt, Veronika Elisabeth (2021). "Antisemitismus im klösterlichen Umfeld Edith Steins?" [Antisemitism in Edith Stein's Monastic Environment?]. Edith-Stein-Jahrbuch (in German). 27: 41–49.
- Sójka, Jacek (2014). "Kontrowersje wokół postaci Edyty Stein" [Controversies around the Figure of Edith Stein]. Zeszyty Naukowe Centrum Badań im. Edyty Stein (in Polish) (11): 23–38. doi:10.14746/CBES.2014.11.23.
- Suchocka, Hanna (2014). "Europa a świadectwo Edyty Stein" [Europe and the Testimony of Edith Stein] (PDF). Zeszyty Naukowe Centrum Badań im. Edyty Stein (in Polish). 11: 345–354.
- Szanto, Thomas; Moran, Dermot (2015). "Introduction: empathy and collective intentionality—The social philosophy of Edith Stein". Human Studies. 38: 445–461. doi:10.1007/s10746-015-9363-3.
- Vainio, Olli-Pekka (2016). "Dark Light: The Mystical Theology of St. Edith Stein". Journal of Analytic Theology. 4: 363–382. doi:10.12978/jat.2016-4.1411-65210014a.
- Wolf, Nicole (2008). Wie werde ich Mensch? Annäherung an Edith Steins Beitrag zu einem christlichen Existenzdenken [How Do I Become Human? An Approach to Edith Stein's Contribution to a Christian Existential Thinking] (PhD diss.) (in German). Universität Hildesheim. Archived from the original on 9 November 2026.
- Williams, Rowan (2025). "Edith Stein and the Imago Trinitatis". Teresianum. 76 (1): 9–25. doi:10.1484/J.TER.5.150495.

=== Online resources ===
- Beckmann-Zöller, Beate (2020). "Edith Steins Bekehrung" [Edith Stein's Conversion]. Edith-Stein-Gesellschaft Deutschland e.V. (in German). Archived from the original on 29 December 2020.
- "Canonization decree published for Edith Stein". Catholic World News. Catholic News Service. 17 February 1998. Archived from the original on 23 July 2019.
- Długoborski, Wacław (2008). "Edith Stein's Political Activism 1918–1919". Centre for Dialogue and Prayer in Oświęcim. Archived from the original on 29 November 2023.
- Edith-Stein-Gesellschaft Deutschland e.V. (March 2025). "Mitteilungen Nr. 115" [Newsletter No. 115] (PDF). Edith-Stein-Gesellschaft Deutschland e.V. (in German). Archived from the original (PDF) on 14 November 2026.
- "Heilige Edith Stein wird keine Kirchenlehrerin" [Saint Edith Stein Will Not Become a Doctor of the Church]. Luxemburger Wort (in German). 2024. Archived from the original on 26 September 2024.
- "Edith Steins Lebenschronik" [Edith Stein's Life Chronology]. Edith Stein Archiv (in German). Archived from the original on 5 December 2023.
- Ehrlich, Ernst Ludwig (1999). "Edith Stein und das Judentum" [Edith Stein and Judaism]. Freiburger Rundbrief: Zeitschrift für christlich-jüdische Begegnung (in German). Archived from the original on 12 October 2026.
- Feldes, Joachim (2023). "Edith Steins Firmung" [Edith Stein's Confirmation] (in German). Edith-Stein-Gesellschaft Deutschland e.V. Archived from the original on 7 June 2026.
- Foxman, Abraham H.; Klenicki, Leon (1998). "The Canonization of Edith Stein: An Unnecessary Problem". Anti-Defamation League. Archived from the original on 23 August 2014.
- Fabene, Fabio (2023). "Intervento alla presentazione del libro "Ireneo di Lione. Doctor unitatis"" [Intervention at the Presentation of the Book "Irenaeus of Lyon: Doctor unitatis"]. Cause dei Santi (in Italian). Archived from the original on 19 July 2025.
- Goodstein, Laurie (11 October 1998). "Miracle in Massachusetts Qualified Stein for Sainthood". The New York Times. Archived from the original on 8 April 2025.
- Mares, Courtney (2024). "Could Edith Stein be declared the next doctor of the Church?". Catholic News Agency. Archived from the original on 26 February 2026.
- Knab, Jakob (2026). "P. Daniel Feuling OSB (1882–1947)—ein Wegbereiter" [P. Daniel Feuling OSB (1882-1947)—a pioneer]. Kirche heute (in German). Vol. 7/July. Archived from the original on 5 November 2026.
- Moynihan, Robert (2003). "Edith Stein's Letter". CatholicCulture.org. Archived from the original on 18 August 2019.
- "Münster (Kirche St. Ludgeri), Nordrhein-Westfalen" [Münster (St. Ludgeri Church), North Rhine-Westphalia]. Onlineprojekt Gefallenendenkmäler (in German). 2011. Archived from the original on 12 December 2024.
- Raunft, Edmund (2021). "Pfarrer Eugen Breitling taufte 1922 die Jüdin Edith Stein" [Pastor Eugen Breitling baptized the Jew Edith Stein in 1922]. Speyer Kurier (in German). Archived from the original on 30 December 2021.
- "Secret Nazi Accounts of Events of July, 1942". Catholic Culture. n.d. Archived from the original on 11 November 2026.
- Spiazzi, Raimondo (2003). "Edith Stein: St Teresa Benedicta of the Cross". L'Osservatore Romano (Weekly Edition in English ed.). p. 9. Archived from the original on 14 November 2026 – via EWTN.
- Sullivan, John (2020). "Sartorial Sharing: St. Edith Stein and Godmother Hedwig Conrad-Martius". DiscalcedCarmel. Archived from the original on 1 November 2026.
- Tomasetti, Beatrice (10 December 2022). "Soll Edith Stein zur Kirchenlehrerin erhoben werden? Spannende Diskussion mit Pro und Contra" [Should Edith Stein Be Elevated to Doctor of the Church? An Engaging Discussion with Pro and Contra]. Domradio (in German). Archived from the original on 19 December 2022.
- "La Sabiduría de la Cruz y Dos Mujeres Claves del Pontificado de Juan Pablo II" [The Wisdom of the Cross and Two Key Women of John Paul II's Pontificate]. Corazones.org (in Spanish). n.d. Archived from the original on 27 November 2006.

=== Primary sources ===
- Baaden, James Raphael (8 May 1987). "Jewish scholar allowed input for Stein beatification". National Catholic Reporter. Vol. 23. p. 8.
- Conrad-Martius, Hedwig (1998). "Hedwig Conrad-Martius". In Herbstrith, Waltraud (ed.). Never Forget: Christian and Jewish Perspectives on Edith Stein. Translated by Batzdorff, Susanne. ICS Publications. pp. 265–267. ISBN 0-935216-62-6. OCLC 37902335.
- John Paul II (1987). "Si Vos Manseritis: Litterae Apostolicae" [If You Remain: Apostolic Letter]. Documenta Catholica Omnia (in Latin). Archived from the original on 9 December 2019.
- John Paul II (14 September 1998). "Fides et Ratio: Encyclical Letter on the Relationship between Faith and Reason". The Holy See. Archived from the original on 21 July 2026.
- John Paul II (1998). "Quae Mihi Erant: Litterae Decretales" [Things That Were Mine: Decree Letter]. The Holy See (in Latin). Archived from the original on 11 August 2020.
- John Paul II (1998). "Homily for the Canonization of Edith Stein". The Holy See. Archived from the original on 5 December 2019.
- John Paul II (1999). "Motu Proprio: Proclamation of Saint Bridget of Sweden, Saint Catherine of Siena and Saint Teresa Benedicta of the Cross as Co-Patronesses of Europe". The Holy See. Archived from the original on 15 November 2019.
- John Paul II (1999). "Homily at the Opening Mass of the Second Special Assembly for Europe of the Synod of Bishops". The Holy See. Archived from the original on 21 February 2026.
- Stein, Edith (1986) [1939]. Gelber, L.; Leuven, Romaeus (eds.). Life in a Jewish Family 1891–1916: An Autobiography. Translated by Koeppel, Josephine. ICS Publications. ISBN 0-935216-04-9. OCLC 1043671210.
- Stein, Edith (1993). Gelber, L.; Leuven, Romaeus (eds.). Self-Portrait in Letters, 1916–1942. Translated by Koeppel, Josephine. ICS Publications. ISBN 9780935216202. OCLC 27725770.
- Stein, Edith (2000). Knowledge and Faith. The Collected Works of Edith Stein. Vol. 8. Translated by Redmond, Walter. Washington, D.C.: ICS Publications. ISBN 978-0-935216-77-6.
- Stein, Edith (2000). Aus dem Leben einer jüdischen Familie und weitere autobiographische Beiträge [From the Life of a Jewish Family and Other Autobiographical Contributions] (PDF). Edith Stein Gesamtausgabe (in German). Vol. 1. Herder. Archived (PDF) from the original on 13 November 2026.
- Stein, Edith (2000). Selbstbildnis in Briefen I: Erster Teil 1916–1933 (PDF). Edith Stein Gesamtausgabe (in German). Vol. 2. Herder. Archived (PDF) from the original on 27 October 2026.
- Stein, Edith (2000). Neyer, Maria Amata (ed.). Selbstbildnis in Briefen II (1933–1942) (PDF) (in German). Herder. ISBN 3-451-27373-X. Archived from the original (PDF) on 16 March 2016 – via Teresianischer Karmel in Deutschland.
- Stein, Edith (2001). Selbstbildnis in Briefen III: Briefe an Roman Ingarden [Self-portrait in Letters III: Letters to Roman Ingarden] (PDF). Edith Stein Gesamtausgabe (in German). Vol. 4. Herder. Archived (PDF) from the original on 30 October 2026.
- Stein, Edith (2002). The Science of the Cross. The Collected Works of Edith Stein. Vol. 6. Translated by Koeppel, Josephine. Washington, D.C.: ICS Publications. ISBN 978-0-935216-31-8.
- Stein, Edith (2009). Potency and Act: Studies Toward a Philosophy of Being. The Collected Works of Edith Stein. Vol. 11. Translated by Redmond, Walter. Washington, D.C.: ICS Publications. ISBN 978-0-935216-47-9.
- Stein, Edith (2005) [1938]. "The Road to Carmel (translation of "Wie ich in den Kölner Karmel kam")". In Batzdorff, Susanne M.; Koeppel, Josephine; Sullivan, John (eds.). Edith Stein: The Life of a Philosopher and Carmelite. Translated by Batzdorff, Susanne M. ICS Publications. pp. 114–127. ISBN 978-0-935216-36-3. OCLC 57422444.
- Stein, Edith (2014). Edith Stein Letters to Roman Ingarden. Translated by Hunt, Hugh Candler. ICS Publications. ISBN 9781939272256. OCLC 903588719.
- Stein, Edith (2023). Finite and Eternal Being: An Attempt at an Ascent to the Meaning of Being. The Collected Works of Edith Stein. Vol. 9. Translated by Reinhardt, Kurt F. Washington, D.C.: ICS Publications. ISBN 978-1-939272-64-5.
