= Rota (architecture) =

Rotating device built into a wall

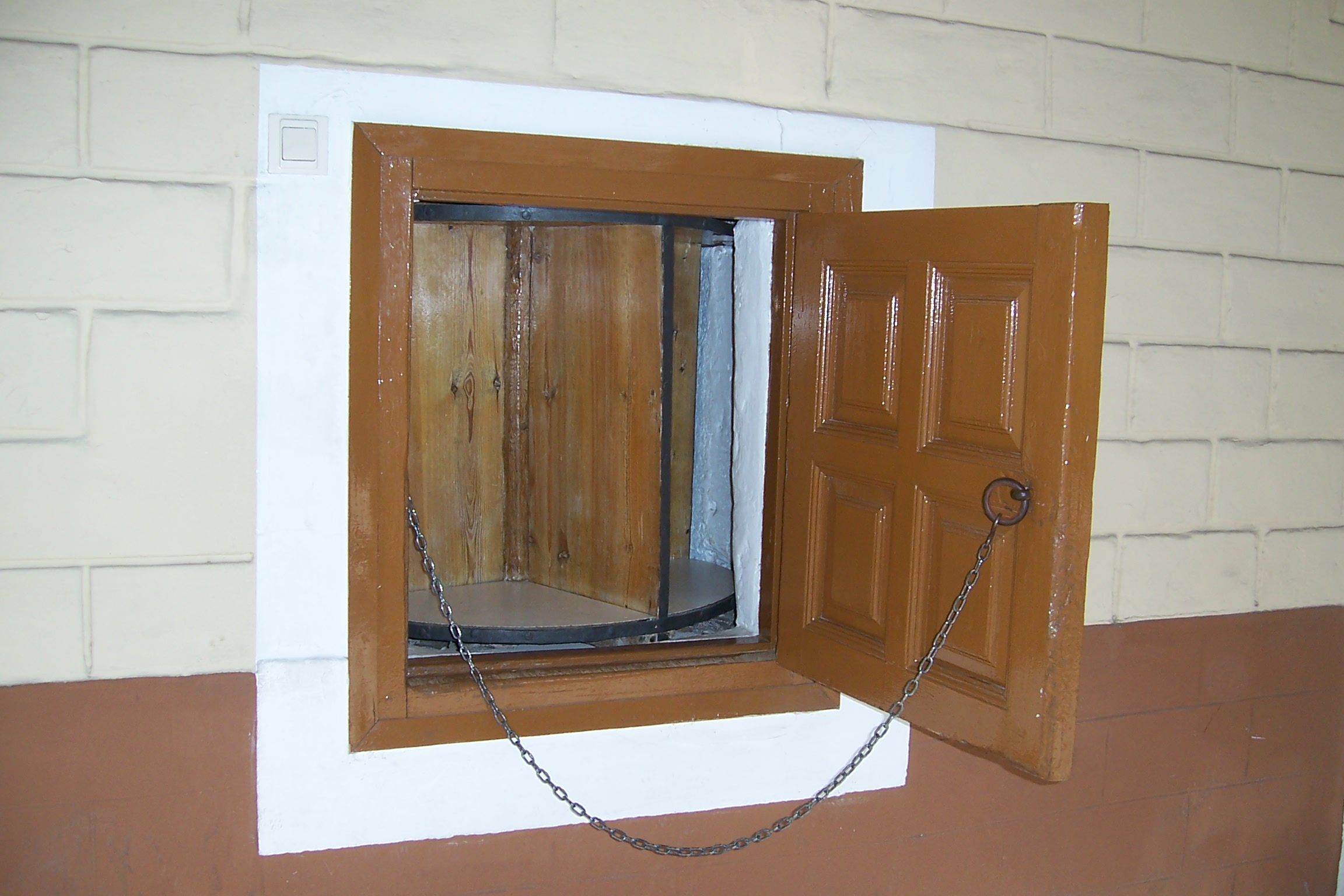
Turn in the convent of the Madres Dominicas de Santa Catalina in Valladolid

The rota or "turn" is a cylinder on a vertical axis, open on one side, that is built inside a wall of a monastery, convent or foundling hospital. It was used for exchanging mail and food with nuns living in enclosure. It is usually about 50 centimeters wide by 30 centimeters high, and its opening does not permit visual or tactile contact between the turn sister and the externs. Messages or food are put into the turn, then it is revolved so that the opening faces the other side.

Nuns were stationed close by, or were notified by various mechanisms that the wheel had been turned. In some cases, especially at night and in winter, the rota was filled with food for the poor, to give them something to eat.
