= Church of the Sacred Heart (Kassel) =

Roman Catholic parish church in Kassel-Niederzwehren

Coordinates: 51°17′24.6″N 9°27′41.5″E

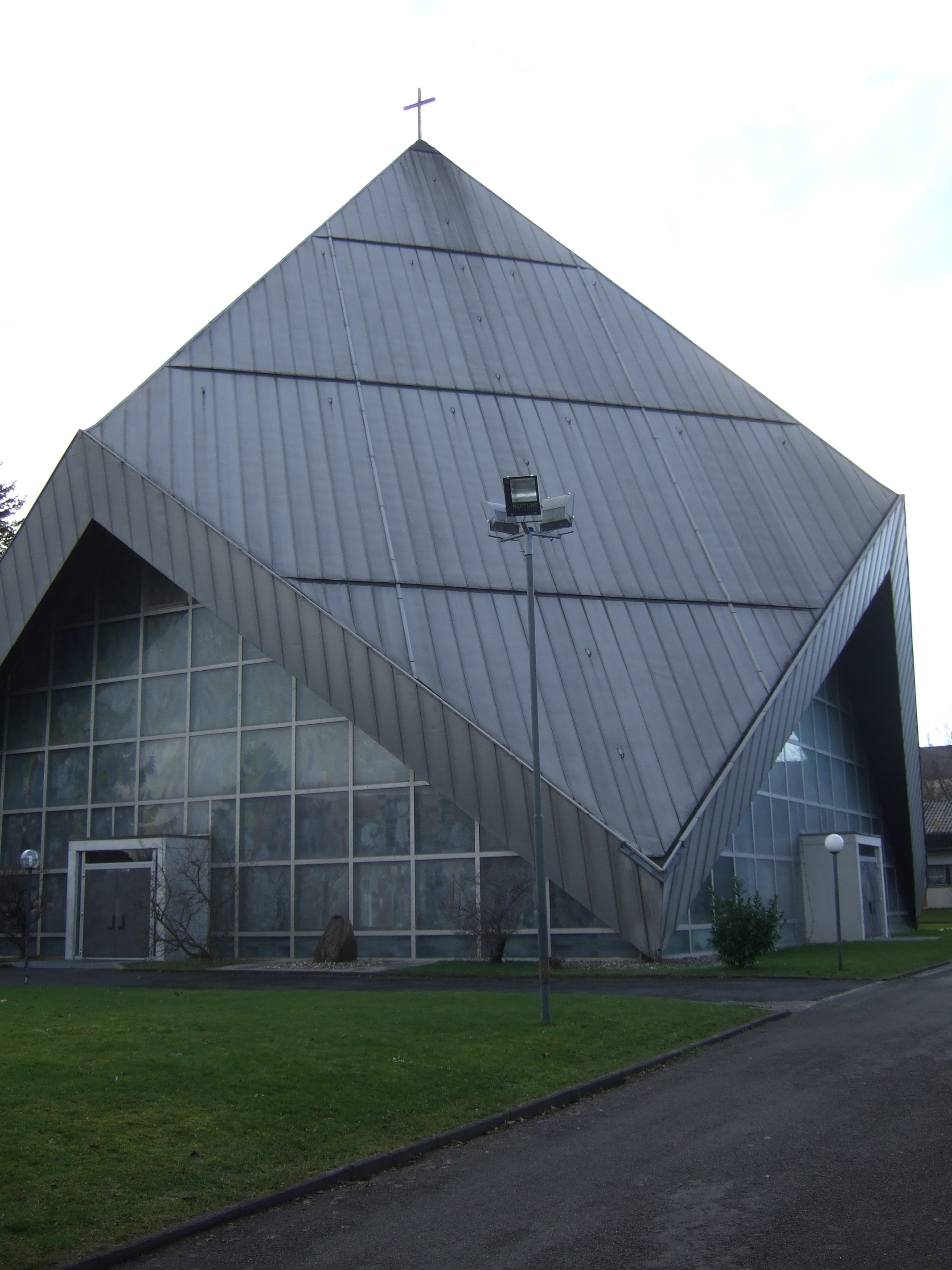
The Catholic Church of the Sacred Heart, Kassel

The Church of the Sacred Heart (Herz-Jesu-Kirche) is a Roman Catholic parish church in Kassel-Niederzwehren, a municipal district of Kassel, Germany. It belongs to the Diocese of Fulda.

== Architecture ==
This church is located on Brüder-Grimm-Straße in the Niederzwehren district of Kassel. Surrounded by a low-rise residential are, the pyramid-shaped structure dominates its immediate surroundings. The church, which was consecrated on December 13, 1970, was designed by the Fulda-based architect Erick Weber. with large triangular sections that open up within the facade. The corners of the church floors have been chamfered to allow large triangular windows sections in the lower half of the facade. The plans included a free-standing bell tower, but it was never constructed.

== Stained-glass Windows ==
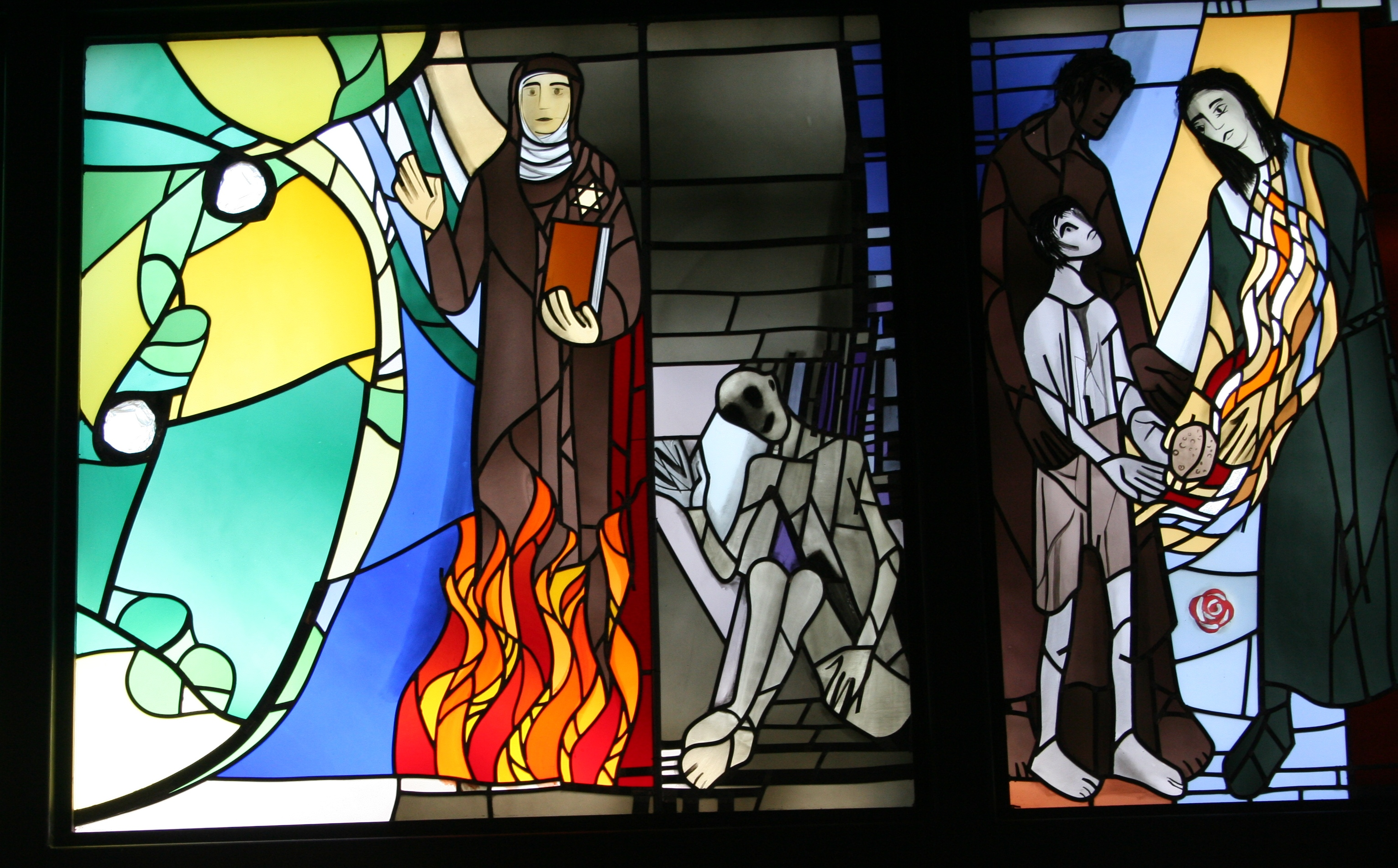
Stain-glass windows of the church by Alois Plum, 1983–1993. The figures represent Edith Stein, Maximilian Kolbe, and Elizabeth of Hungary

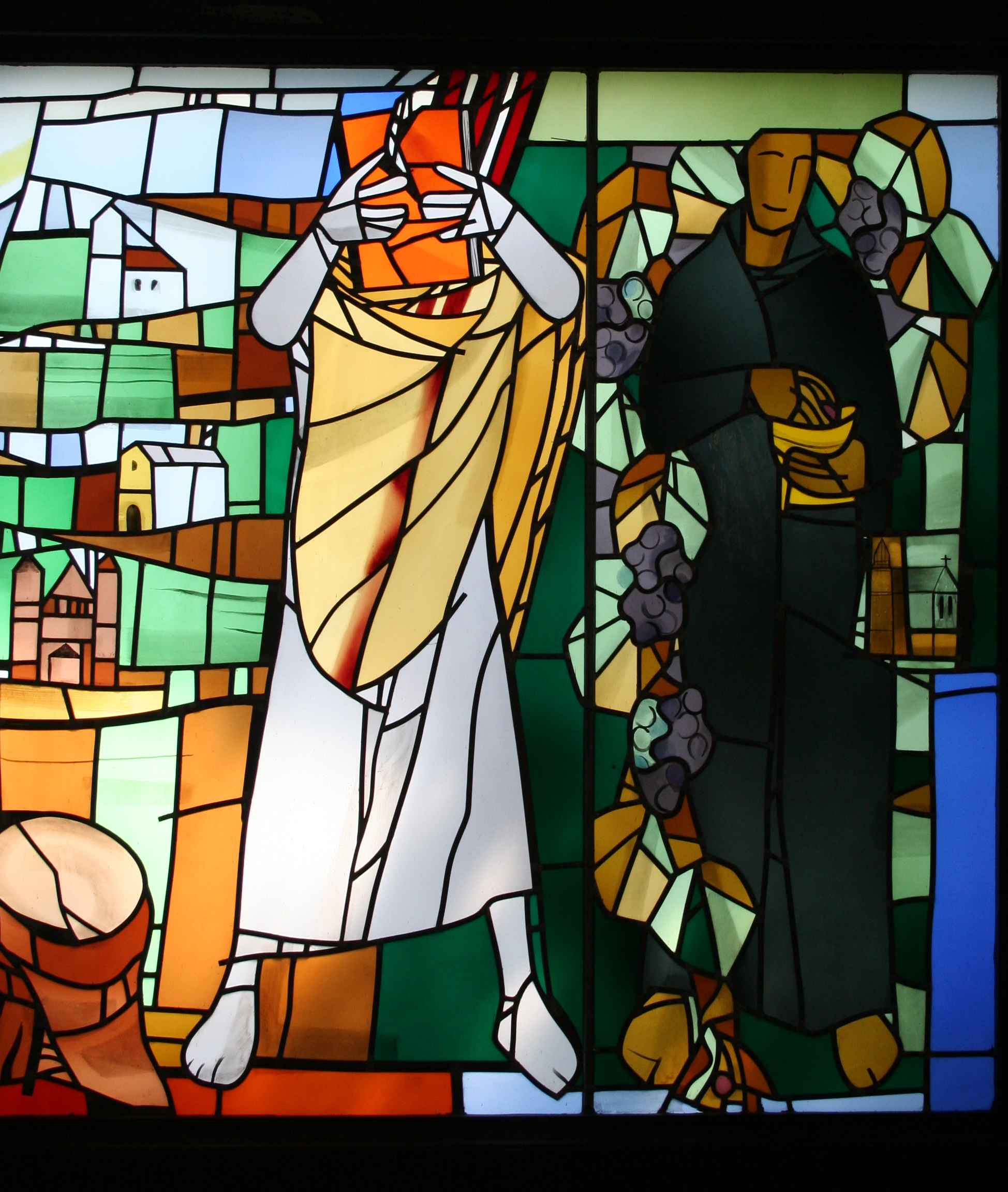
Stain-glass windows by Alois Plum representing St. Wigbert (on the right) and St. Boniface, 1983–1993

Between 1983 and 1993, four windows by the artist Alois Plum were installed. their scale and vibrant colors define the character of the tent-like interior as the light dynamically changes with the rising sun going through different colored windows. the alter windows, which were completed in 1984, are a spiraling design representing the Heavenly Jerusalem. Other windows represent biblical themes; one that depicts Noah's ark includes a blue dinosaur, which may be one of the first depictions of a dinosaur in a Catholic church. Others depict the life of saints, including Hildegard of Bingen, St. Augustine, and Edith Stein.

== Literature ==
- Anders, Johanna (2014). Neue Kirchen in der Diaspora: Über einhundert neue Kirchen für die katholische Minderheit in Nordhessen seit 1945 – Studie dokumentiert moderne katholische. Kassel University Press. ISBN 978-3-86219-682-1.

== Weblinks ==
- Homepage der Pfarrgemeinde Herz Jesu
