= Psychologie und Schule =

Book by Otto Lipmann from 1920

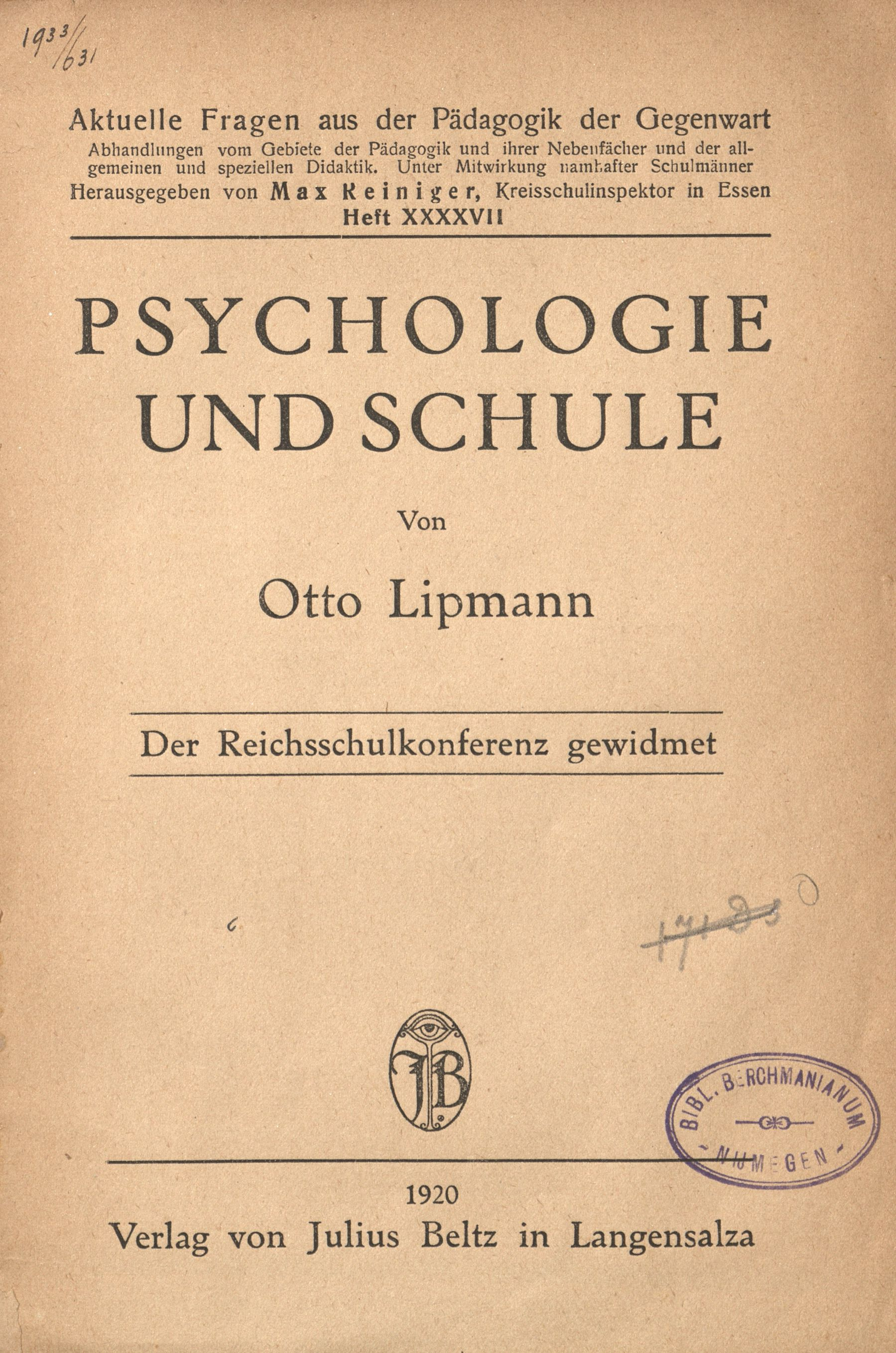
- Title page of the first edition
- Author: Otto Lipmann
- Language: German
- Publisher: Julius Beltz
- Publication date: 1920

Psychologie und Schule (English: Psychology and school) is a German book published in 1920 by the German author Otto Lipmann. It was published by the Julius Beltz publishing company and is book 47 of the series Aktuelle Fragen aus der Pädagogik der Gegenwart (English: Current questions in the present pedagogy), issued by Max Reiniger. The book discusses the field of use of psychology in the school environment. By writing it Lipmann wanted to teach the readers about the development of modern psychology in 1920 and its relation to pedagogy. It incorporates topics with regard to education that are also dealt with in the 21st century and gives insights into the progress made in the 20th century.

== Context ==
After finishing his banking apprenticeship, Otto Lipmann studied philosophy and psychology from 1899 to 1904 in Munich, Berlin, and Wroclaw. In 1906, he founded the Institute for Applied Psychology and collective psychological research in Berlin together with William Stern and took over the sole management in 1916. Together with Stern, he founded the Zeitschrift für Angewandte Psychologie (English: Journal of Applied Psychology) from 1906 to 1933, in which he published articles about applied psychology and educational psychology. Lipmann's focus on work and educational psychology was also present in multiple books he published before 1920, the publication year of Psychologie und Schule. Examples of those are Grundriss der Psychologie für Pädagogen (English: Outline of Psychology for Educators) in 1909, Forschung und Unterricht in der Jugendkunde (English: Research and teaching in youth studies) that he wrote together with William Stern in 1912, as well as Schriften zur Psychologie der Berufseignung und des Wirtschaftslebens (English: Writings on the psychology of professional aptitude and economic life), a journal he wrote together with Stern from 1918 until 1933. With those publications, Lipmann contributed to advances in the field of applied psychology. His book Psychologie für Lehrer (English: Psychology for teachers) which he published in the same year as Psychologie und Schule deals with the outcomes of psychology that are relevant for teachers in the economical system. Lipmann declares those two books as supplementing each other by expanding the reader's knowledge.

With Psychologie und Schule (English: Psychology and school), Lipmann reacted to the outcomes of the Reich School Conference in Berlin, in 1920. The conference was convened by the Reich Ministry of the Interior under Erich Koch-Weser, and systematically reorganized the German school system in the Weimar Republic. He argued that those outcomes were not representative of the up-to-date state of modern psychology during that time period. The Reich School Conference differed from all other school conferences that took part in the Empire and before in one important respect: for the first time, it was an event organized by the Reich and not by the individual states. It also did not consider separately lower and higher schools for boys and girls but pursued the idea of a comprehensive school system. The Reich School Conference took place with reference to the Imperial Constitution of August 11, 1919, in which a uniform program for the entire public school system was laid down. This program established principles of compulsory education and included all public schools, from the beginning of compulsory education to leaving school and entering employment or college. These principles were decided on because until then it was up to the individual German federal states to take care of cultural tasks, whereby they did not have to take each other's decisions into account. The different cultural and historical development of the individual countries meant that the school system also differed greatly from one another. This lack of uniformity was particularly noticeable in the internal and external organization of school life. Lipmann was concerned with counteracting the prevailing work organization of the time, Taylorism. His goal was to replace it with a psychologically sound form of work design. He tried to make the relationship between work psychology and social interests explicit by asking in whose interest work psychology should be practiced, by whom, and under what conditions.

== Content ==
The book is divided into four different chapters, namely psychology and applied psychology, psychology and education, psychology and the school, and psychological training of the teacher. In the first two chapters, Lipmann starts by explaining how psychology as a domain developed in the past and explains the start of general, individual as well as differential psychology. Two important concepts of Lipmann that he introduces in his book are psychognostics (German: Psychognostik) and psychotechnics (German: Psychotechnik). Psychognostics is the knowledge of human nature based on psychological studies. Applied to the school environment, it refers to the knowledge of a student's personality that needs to be considered by teachers and educators. Psychotechnics is the application of psychological concepts to optimize human handling, which with regards to school refers to the teaching of means by how this personality can be influenced. The third chapter Psychology and the school deals with the school structure, the content of the classes, as well as with teaching mediums. He criticizes the division by position, by religious beliefs and by gender, that were common at that time. What he strives for is no benefit for socially superior individuals or money, and no gender division at school to eventually reach equality for everybody. Concerning the curriculum he proposes the courses of moral education, worldview, history, aesthetic education, sex education, and practical courses. For Lipmann, it is important that every student should be able to form their own opinion about any subject, whilst teachers offer them objective and broad information. This approach is also made clear in his point of view on how to teach students. Self-studying is an important concept that he strives for, as well as a more practical teaching medium, that makes use of all senses. In the fourth chapter, Lipmann suggests psychological seminars for teachers about how to teach children and youth, next to a general knowledge about psychognostic and psychotechnics that they need to have. He would like teachers to pay special attention to students that differ from the norm, investigate why that is the case, and support them accordingly.

== Reception ==
The approach that Lipmann defends in his book was taken over by other psychologists like Muchow, Valentiner, and Döring, who shared his way of thinking about education. His idea of creating a catalog compromising the requirements to be successful in multiple professions also influenced psychologists like Erich Hylla. Hylla based his draft of an observation sheet very closely on Lipmann's template. Teachers in Berlin welcomed Hylla's and Lipmann's suggestion, however, they did not want to be told how and what to observe in their students and feared a disproportionate additional effort. Lipmann's catalog asked about interests and intelligence, about type of work and talent. In order to gain the support of the teachers, the Berlin vocational office carried out an information campaign in 1923. Teachers were invited to guided tours of the careers office and lectures on careers advice were offered. The questionnaire, which the Berlin employment office published in 1923 with the involvement of the teachers, was strongly based on Lipmann's draft from 1920. In December 1932, in recognition of his services, he received a teaching post for work psychology from the University of Berlin.

Lipmann succeeded in his goal of educating his readers about the current psychological advancements with regard to education and school. However, the work initiated by Lipmann could not be continued in Germany to the extent he hoped for. Due to the political events, many representatives of the applied psychology emigrated, although they also carried his ideas across the borders, especially to the USA.

After publishing his book in 1920, Lipmann further wrote books and journals about the topic of educational psychology as well as applied psychology and thereby continued his interest in that matter. Some examples are Bibliographie zur psychologischen Berufsberatung: Berufseignungsforschung und Berufskunde (1922) (English: Bibliography on psychological careers advice: career aptitude research and professional knowledge)., Grundriss der Arbeitswissenschaft und Ergebnisse der Arbeitswissenschaftlichen Statistik (1926) (English: Outline of work science and results of work science statistics), and Lehrbuch der Arbeitswissenschaft (1932) (English: Textbook of Ergonomics).

His book can be found in the special book collection of Maastricht University.
