= Turn sister =

Nun who operates the turn in an enclosed convent

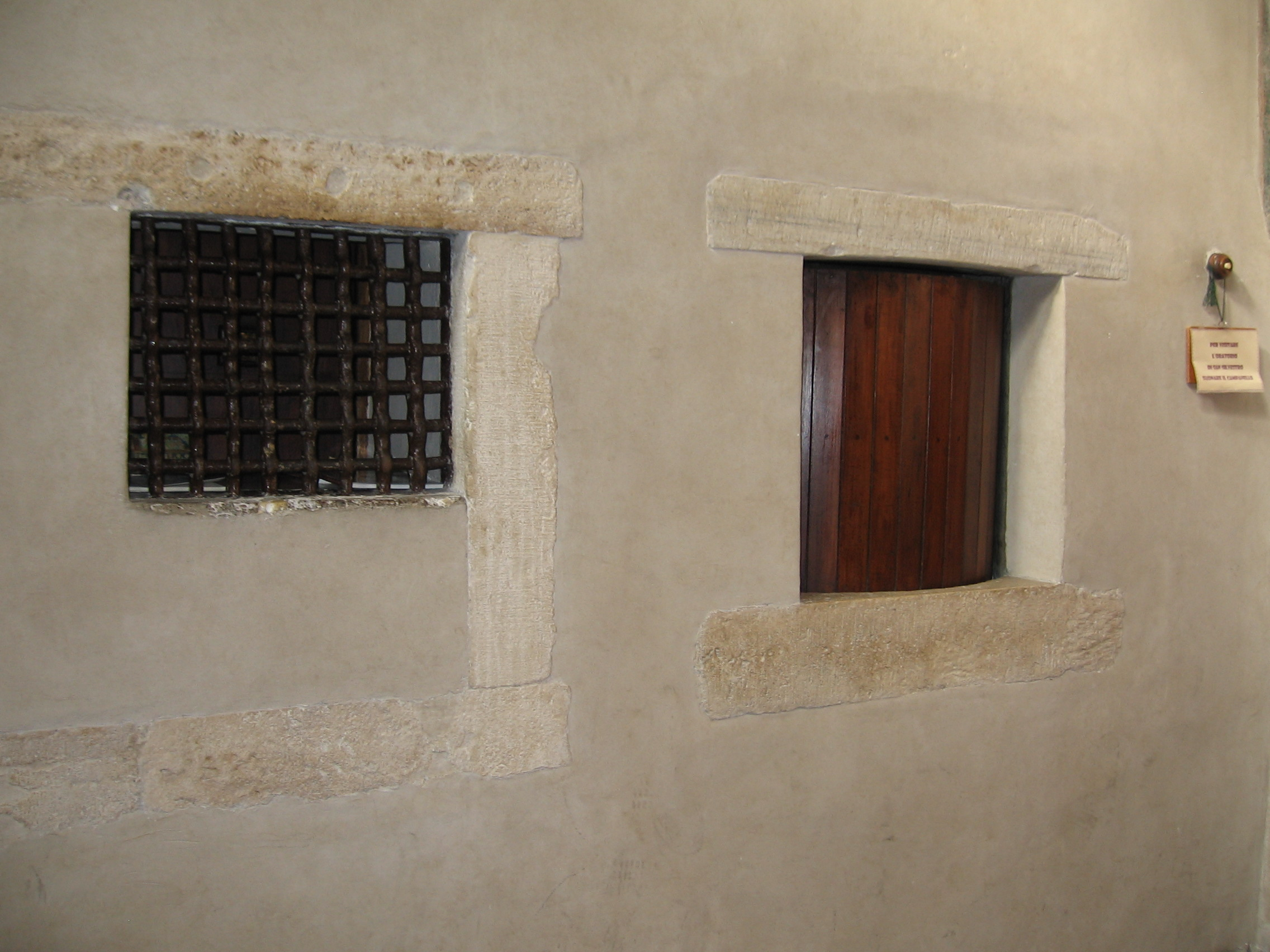
Turn locked in place at the parlor of a Carmelite convent (on the right, next to the parlour grille)

A turn sister is a nun who, in a contemplative convent living in papal enclosure, such as the Discalced Carmelites or the Poor Clares, is responsible for operating the turn; her duties also include ordering supplies for the community, looking after the extern sisters, and providing for the convent's guests.

The nun is called a "turn sister" because she is in charge of the turn, a circular device that rotates around its central axis but can also be locked in place. It is used in enclosed communities for communication with the extern sisters living outside the enclosure. The sisters cannot see each other, but they can hear each other clearly. Mail, packages, supplies, food, etc., reach the enclosure via this route. A turn is often located in one of the convent parlours near the parlour grille or in a wall that is accessible from both the area of the convent's portresses and the enclosure. There is also such a turn in the sacristy of the convent's chapel, through which the vestments, chalices and other sacred vessels, etc., are delivered to the sacristan outside the area of the enclosure. Every day, the turn sister is obliged to report to the community what alms had been received during the day and the names of the givers, "that the sisters may be careful to remember them in their prayers unto God". Because the duties were considerable, convents often had a second turn sister.

Teresa of Ávila stipulated in her constitutions – a foundational document for the practical organisation, spiritual discipline, and communal life of the Discalced Carmelite nuns, established through her reform of the Carmelite Order – to have the turn "threelocked"; the prioress must have one key, and the other two must be held "by the most senior members" of the convent's counsel. According to Teresa, the turn sister should be prudent, tactful and, above all, discrete. The office of a turn sister is therefore also considered an important one, entrusted only to sisters who have already taken their vows for some time.
