= Jean Héring =

Jean Héring (1890–1966) was an Alsatian philosopher and theologian influenced by the phenomenology of Edmund Husserl. He was one of the earliest to introduce phenomenology to France.
