= Otto Lipmann =

- Born: 6 March 1880; Breslau
- Died: 7 October 1933 (aged 53); Neubabelsberg

Academic background
- Education: University of Breslau

Academic work
- Discipline: psychology
- Sub-discipline: industrial psychology
- Institutions: Institute for Applied Psychology; Institute of Professional and Business Psychology
- Main interests: vocational guidance

Otto Lipmann (6 March 1880 – 7 October 1933) was a German psychologist, an expert in vocational guidance, and one of the pioneers in the use of counseling for the selection of a profession.

== Biography ==
Otto Lipmann was born in Breslau on March 6, 1880. His parents were Emo Lipmann and Hulda Wendrina. In 1904, he received his Ph.D. from the University of Breslau. Over the years, Lipmann contributed to several fields of psychology, especially industrial psychology, with the development of the first selection tests for aviators in Germany, and also for typesetters, industrial apprentices, telegraphists and academic workers, amongst others. He also introduced the principles of vocational guidance in that country, and was the first psychologist to employ statistics in his works, which include "Psychische Geschlechtsunterschiede", "Wirtschaftspsychologie und psychologische Berufsberatung", "Die psychologische Analyse der höheren Berufe" and "Grundriss der Arbeitswissenschaft und Ergebnisse der arbeitswissenschaftlichen Statistik".

In 1906, along with psychologist William Stern, Lipmann founded the Institute for Applied Psychology in Berlin, and in 1908, the Journal of Applied Psychology ("Zeitschrift für angewandte Psychologie"). In 1920, along with Curt Piorkowski, he founded the Institute of Professional and Business Psychology, which was in charge of the development of psychological tests of professional skills and vocational guidance. The same year he published the book Psychologie und Schule. As a consequence of the rise of the National Socialist party in Germany, on 1 October 1933, Lipmann was discharged as an editor of the Journal of Applied Psychology. That same year he was forced to turn down a job offer from the University of Berlin, an opportunity he had considered due to his declining finances.

Lipmann married Gertrude Wendrina, with whom he had two children, Hans (1908–1931) and Emily Marta (born on 6 July 1907). On October 7, 1933, Lipmann died of an unexpected heart failure. In 1937, his daughter Emily emigrated from Germany, and so did his wife one year later. Gertrude died in Alexandria, Egypt, in December 1941. Emily married Vladimir Kaplun and they had three daughters, Katherine, Helen and Irene.

== Science of Work ==
Lipmann proposes a distinction between "capacity-to-work" and "preparedness-to-work". The former is defined as "an individual's maximal performance under ideal conditions", while the latter is related to the "willingness-to-work", which involves the worker's motivation and satisfaction, and can be increased with compensation systems and fair promotions, for example.

As to vocational guidance, Lipmann says that psychological counseling –carried out through tests, questionnaires and analysis of professions– is more effective if it's based on personality traits, which helps determine a suitable profession for each individual. He also proposes a classification for professions: lower, middle, and high. Since these classifications are based on the characteristics of the individuals, their boundaries are not fixed. For example, a worker can elevate a middle profession to a higher artistic level if he performs his tasks with creativity and imagination. At the same time, high professions can be subjective (imagination plays an important role) or objective (things are perceived without the influence of feelings or imagination).

Lipmann was very critical of the scientific management approaches of Frederick Winslow Taylor and Lillian and Frank Gilbreth. He believed that loss of efficiency was related to the lack of interest from the workers, and feared that technological advances would damage the link between the worker and his work, generating more dissatisfaction.
