= Early phenomenology =

Early phenomenology is the early phase of the phenomenological movement, from the 1890s until the Second World War. The figures associated with early phenomenology are Edmund Husserl and his followers and students, particularly the members of the Göttingen and Munich Circles, as well as a number of students of Carl Stumpf and Theodor Lipps. It excludes the later existential phenomenology inspired by Martin Heidegger. Early phenomenology can be divided into two theoretical camps: realist phenomenology, and transcendental or constitutive phenomenology.

Alongside Husserl, the other editors of the Jahrbuch für Philosophie und phänomenologische Forschung, Moritz Geiger, Alexander Pfänder, Adolf Reinach, and Max Scheler, are typically identified as the fathers of early phenomenology.

The end of the early phenomenology is marked by a series of events, including the death of Husserl in 1938, the increased influence of Heidegger, and the outbreak of the Second World War, which saw the scattering and death of a number of the early phenomenologists. The end of the early phase of the phenomenological movement led by Husserl is foreshadowed by the differences between Husserl and Heidegger concerning the Encyclopædia Britannica article on 'Phenomenology'.

== Phenomenology prior to the Logical Investigations ==
While Husserl's Logical Investigations is the foundational text of phenomenology, it is not the first. Theodor Lipps' student Alexander Pfänder published his Phänomenologie des Wollens: eine psychologische analyse in 1900, based on his dissertation of 1899, which was a work in phenomenology conceived as descriptive psychology. During the 1890s, Husserl's phenomenology was in its developmental stages. The origins of Husserl's phenomenology can be traced back to his unpublished essay Intentional Objects, which dates as far back as 1894.

== The Logical Investigations (1900/01) and the Munich Circle ==
Shortly before his appointment as professor at the University of Göttingen in 1901, Husserl published the first edition of his Logical Investigations. In Volume I of this work, the Prolegomena to Pure Logic, Husserl presents his now famous polemic against logical psychologism (the attempt to reduce the laws of logic to psychological laws). The term 'phenomenology' only appears once in the first edition of Volume I, in a footnote to section 57. Volume II introduces Husserl's phenomenology, which he characterizes as both a science of essences and as a descriptive psychology that aims to serve as a groundwork for a radical critique of knowledge. In outlining the phenomenological project of the Logical Investigations, Husserl writes:

we are concerned [herein] with discussions of a most general sort which cover the wider sphere of an objective theory of knowledge and, closely linked with this last, the purely descriptive phenomenology of the experiences of thinking and knowing. This sphere we must explore in preparation for the epistemological criticism and clarification of pure logic: our investigations will therefore all move within it. Pure phenomenology represents a field of neutral researches, in which several sciences have their roots. It is, on the one hand, an ancillary to 'psychology' conceived as an empirical science. It analyses and describes (especially as a phenomenology of thinking and knowing) the experiences of presentation, judgement and knowledge...On the other hand, phenomenology lays bare the 'sources' from which the basic concepts and ideal laws of pure logic 'flow', and back to which they must once more be traced, so as to give them all the 'clearness and distinctness' needed for an understanding, and for an epistemological critique, of pure logic.

It is also in the opening pages of Volume II where Husserl gives his famous battle-cry, "back to the things themselves."

Our great task is now to bring the Ideas of logic, the logical concepts and laws, to epistemological clarity and definiteness. Here phenomenological analysis must begin. Logical concepts, as valid thought-unities, must have their origin in intuition: they must arise out of an ideational intuition founded on certain experiences, and must admit of indefinite reconfirmation, and of recognition of their self-identity, on the re-performance of such abstraction. Otherwise put: we can absolutely not rest content with 'mere words', i.e. with a merely symbolic understanding of words, meanings inspired only by remote, confused, inauthentic intuitions- if by any intuitions at all- are not enough. We must go back to the 'things themselves'. We desire to render self-evident in fully-fledged intuitions that what is here given in actually performed abstractions is what the word-meanings in our expression of the law really and truly stand for.

The Logical Investigations gained widespread attention in Europe, and students began to come to Göttingen specifically to study with Husserl. Of particular importance was the reception of the Logical Investigations by a group of psychology students at the Ludwig-Maximilians-Universität München (LMU). In his book, Husserl had been critical of the psychologist Theodor Lipps. A number of Lipps' students agreed with the criticisms made by Husserl, and were drawn to his phenomenology. Starting with Johannes Daubert, many of Lipps' students left the LMU in Munich and headed to the University of Göttingen in order to study with Husserl. This event is often referred to as the "Munich invasion of Göttingen", and is considered to be the starting point of the proper phenomenological movement. In the summer of 1907, the former LMU student Theodor Conrad established a student group at the University of Göttingen to mirror the group that he had been a part of at LMU, with the expressed purpose of studying phenomenology. At the time, there had been a number of students working with Husserl at the University of Göttingen, known as his Urschüler, and with them Conrad formed the Göttingen Circle. In 1909, Adolf Reinach took up a position as Privatdozent at the University of Göttingen, followed shortly thereafter by Max Scheler in 1910, who had lost his teaching position at LMU. Around this same time, Alexandre Koyre, Jean Hering, Edith Stein, and Roman Ingarden joined the young group of phenomenologists.

== Ideas I and the realism/idealism debate ==
While phenomenology as it was presented in the Logical Investigations was flourishing at both the University of Göttingen and the Ludwig-Maximilians-Universität München, Husserl was moving toward a conception of phenomenology as a form of transcendental idealism. In 1905, Husserl traveled to Seefeld for his summer vacation, and was visited by Pfänder and Daubert. In the manuscripts from this time, we find the emergence of the phenomenological reduction and Husserl's first moves toward transcendental idealism. Shortly after the vacation, Daubert penned a manuscript divided into two parts: one on transcendental philosophy, and the other on phenomenology. Upon his return to the University of Göttingen, Husserl began a serious re-reading of Kant, and in 1907, made his new conception of phenomenology public in a series of five lectures titled, The Idea of Phenomenology. The turn away from the descriptive psychology and realist phenomenology outlined in the Logical Investigations was completed with the publication of Ideas Pertaining to a Pure Phenomenology and to a Phenomenological Philosophy in the inaugural edition the Jahrbuch.

Many of Husserl's students, particularly those that he shared with Reinach, resisted the turn to idealism. The phenomenologists who had remained with Lipps at LMU championed realist phenomenology in opposition to Husserl.

== The Urschüler ==
- William Ernest Hocking
- Heinrich Hofmann
- David Katz
- Theodor Lessing
- Dietrich Mahnke
- Karl Neuhaus
- Wilhelm Schapp

== The Munich Circle ==
- Maximilian Beck
- Theodor Conrad
- Hedwig Conrad-Martius
- Johannes Daubert
- Moritz Geiger
- Dietrich von Hildebrand
- Alexander Pfänder
- Adolf Reinach
- Max Scheler

== The Göttingen Circle ==
- Winthrop Pickard Bell
- Siegfried Hamburger
- Jean Hering
- Roman Ingarden
- Fritz Kaufmann
- Alexandre Koyré
- Hans Lipps
- Gustav Shpet
- Kurt Stavenhagen
- Edith Stein
- Alfred von Sybel

== Heterodox students ==
- Dietrich Heinrich Kerler
- Paul Ferdinand Linke

== The Freiburg School ==
- Dorion Cairns
- Theodor Celms
- Eugen Fink
- Aron Gurwitsch
- Emmanuel Levinas
- Gerda Walther

== Bibliography ==
- Josef Seifert and Cheikh Mbacke Gueye (Eds.), Anthologie der Realistischen Phänomenologie, 2009.
- Herbert Spiegelberg, The Phenomenological Movement: A Historical Introduction, 1982
- Helmut Kuhn and Ederhard Avé-Lallemant (Eds.), Die Münchener Phänomenologie, Phaenomenologica 65, 1976.
- Bruno Leclercq, Sébastien Richard, Denis Seron (Eds.), Objects and Pseudo-Objects: Ontological Desert and Jungle from Brentano to Carnap, 2014.
- Kimberly Baltzer-Jaray, "Introduction," Quaestiones Disputatae: Selected Papers on the Early Phenomenology of Munich and Gottingen, 3:1 (2012)
- Marvin Farber, The Foundation of Phenomenology: Edmund Husserl And the Quest for a Rigorous Science of Philosophy, 1943.
- Robin Rollinger, Austrian Phenomenology: Brentano, Husserl, Meinong, and Others on Mind and Object. Frankfurt: Ontos Verlag, 2008.
- Barry Smith, "Realistic Phenomenology”, in L. Embree (ed.), Encyclopedia of Phenomenology, Dordrecht/Boston/London: Kluwer, 1997, pp. 586–590.
