= Erik Peterson (theologian) =

German Catholic theologian (1890–1960)

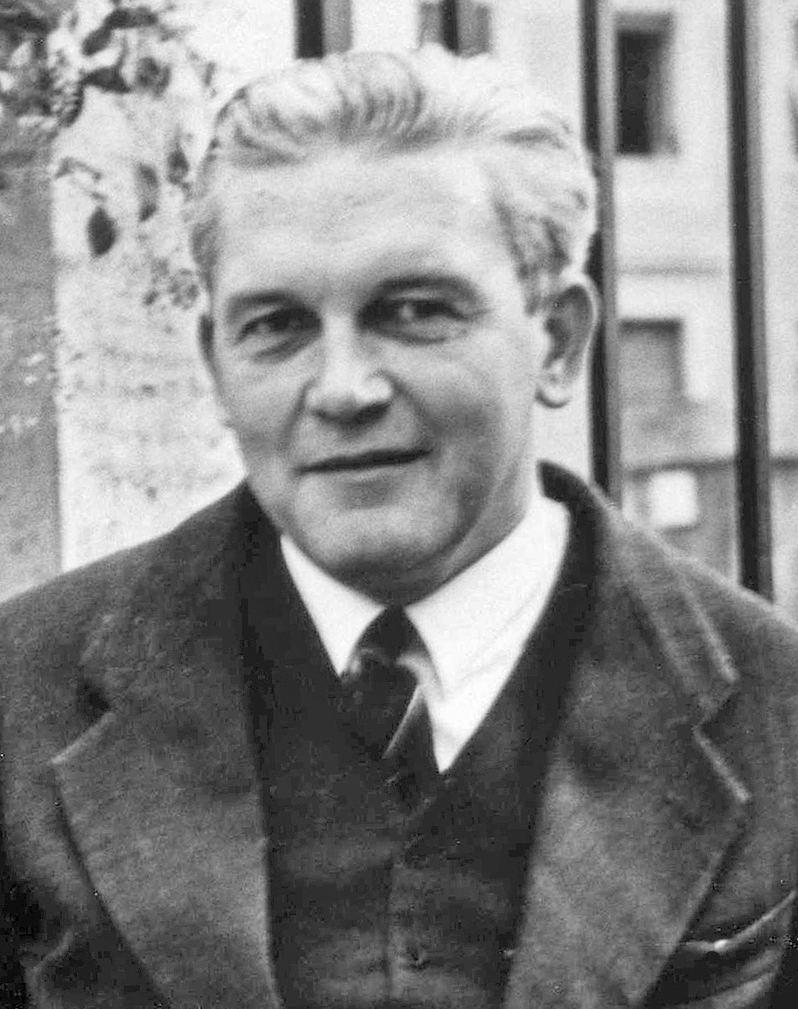
- Erik Peterson in Rome in 1938
- Born: 7 June 1890; Hamburg, Germany
- Died: 26 October 1960 (aged 70)
- Occupations: Theologian, patrologist and historian

Erik Peterson Grandjean (7 June 1890 – 26 October 1960) was a German Catholic theologian, patrologist and Church historian.

== Biography ==
Erik Peterson was born in Hamburg. He studied theology from 1910 to 1914 at the University of Strasbourg, the University of Greifswald, the Friedrich Wilhelm University of Berlin, the University of Basel, and the University of Göttingen, where he defended his doctoral dissertation in 1926. He was initially an evangelical Christian influenced by pietism and Søren Kierkegaard. Through the influence of phenomenology in Göttingen, Edmund Husserl, Adolf Reinach, Hedwig Conrad-Martius, Hans Lipps, Theodor Haecker, Max Scheler, Carl Schmitt, Jacques Maritain and the Liturgical Movement, he opened up to the Catholic world. He converted to Catholicism in 1930 and settled in Munich and then in Rome. In 1947, he became professor of Church history and patrology at the Pontifical Institute for Christian Archaeology in Rome. In 1960, the year of his death, he received honorary doctorates from the University of Bonn (Ph.D.) and the Ludwig-Maximilians-Universität München (Th.D.).

He wrote critically about National Socialism and its political theology as defined by Carl Schmitt, notably in the 1935 essay "Monotheism as a Political Problem". His most prominent theological writings are collected in Theological Tractates (German: Theologische Traktate; German 1951, English 2011) and meditative texts are found in Marginalien zur Theologie (1956).
