= Moritz Geiger =

German philosopher (1880–1937)

Moritz Geiger (26 June 1880 – 9 September 1937) was a German philosopher and a disciple of Edmund Husserl. He was a member of the Munich phenomenological school. Beside phenomenology, he dedicated himself to psychology, epistemology and aesthetics.

== Life ==
Moritz Geiger was born in Frankfurt. He studied law at the Ludwig-Maximilians-Universität München in 1898, then history of literature in 1899, and finally philosophy and psychology in 1900, with Theodor Lipps. During the years 1901 and 1902, he studied experimental psychology with Wilhelm Wundt at Leipzig. Returning to Munich in 1904, he became part of the circle of students around Lipps, which included Alexander Pfänder, Adolf Reinach, Theodor Conrad, Aloys Fischer, Max Scheler, and Dietrich von Hildebrand. In 1906, Geiger attended Husserl's lectures in Göttingen, and became part of the Munich Circle of phenomenology, along with Reinach, Conrad, Fischer and Pfänder. He passed his thesis in 1907. Along with this Husserlian circle (including Max Scheler), he published the review Jahrbuch für Philosophie und phänomenologische Forschung.

In 1915, he became a teacher at Munich and, after World War I, at Göttingen (1923). When the Nazis had him dismissed from his chair because of his Jewish ancestry in 1933, he immigrated to the United States, teaching at Vassar College in New York and at Stanford University.

He died in Seal Harbor, Maine.

Several of his students became famous, such as Klaus Berger, Hans-Georg Gadamer, Walter Benjamin and Karl Löwith.

== Contributions ==
Moritz Geiger was the sustainer of a sui generis phenomenological method of “pure self-given factuality”, without limitation by sensual-visible or idealistic prejudices, without basing the reality on a lower, not-given sphere. In his phenomenology every given fact values equally, independent of whether it is sensual or not. He is also famous for being the founder of aesthetic phenomenology deeply but freely influenced by Husserl.

A less known but very important contribution is in the clarification of the psychological concept of empathy. In a lecture on the essence and meaning of empathy presented at the 4th Congress for experimental psychology in Innsbruck (Austria), Geiger fully describes the different concepts of empathy available in the whole wide panorama of his time. The range of the discussed conceptualizations is wide, from aesthetics to evolutionary theory, from the phenomenal fact of “foreign expressive movements” and “foreign personalities” across the – deeply romantically influenced – treatment of the “animation of subhuman entities”, to end with the aesthetic aspects of empathy.
