= 1988 United States presidential election in New York =

- November 8, 1988

Nominee	Michael Dukakis	George H. W. Bush
Party	Democratic	Republican
Alliance	Liberal	Conservative
Home state	Massachusetts	Texas
Running mate	Lloyd Bentsen	Dan Quayle
Electoral vote	36	0
Popular vote	3,347,882	3,081,871
Percentage	51.62%	47.52%
County results
Dukakis
40–50%
50–60%
60–70%
70–80%
Bush
40–50%
50–60%
60–70%
President before election
Ronald Reagan
Republican
Elected President
George H. W. Bush
Republican

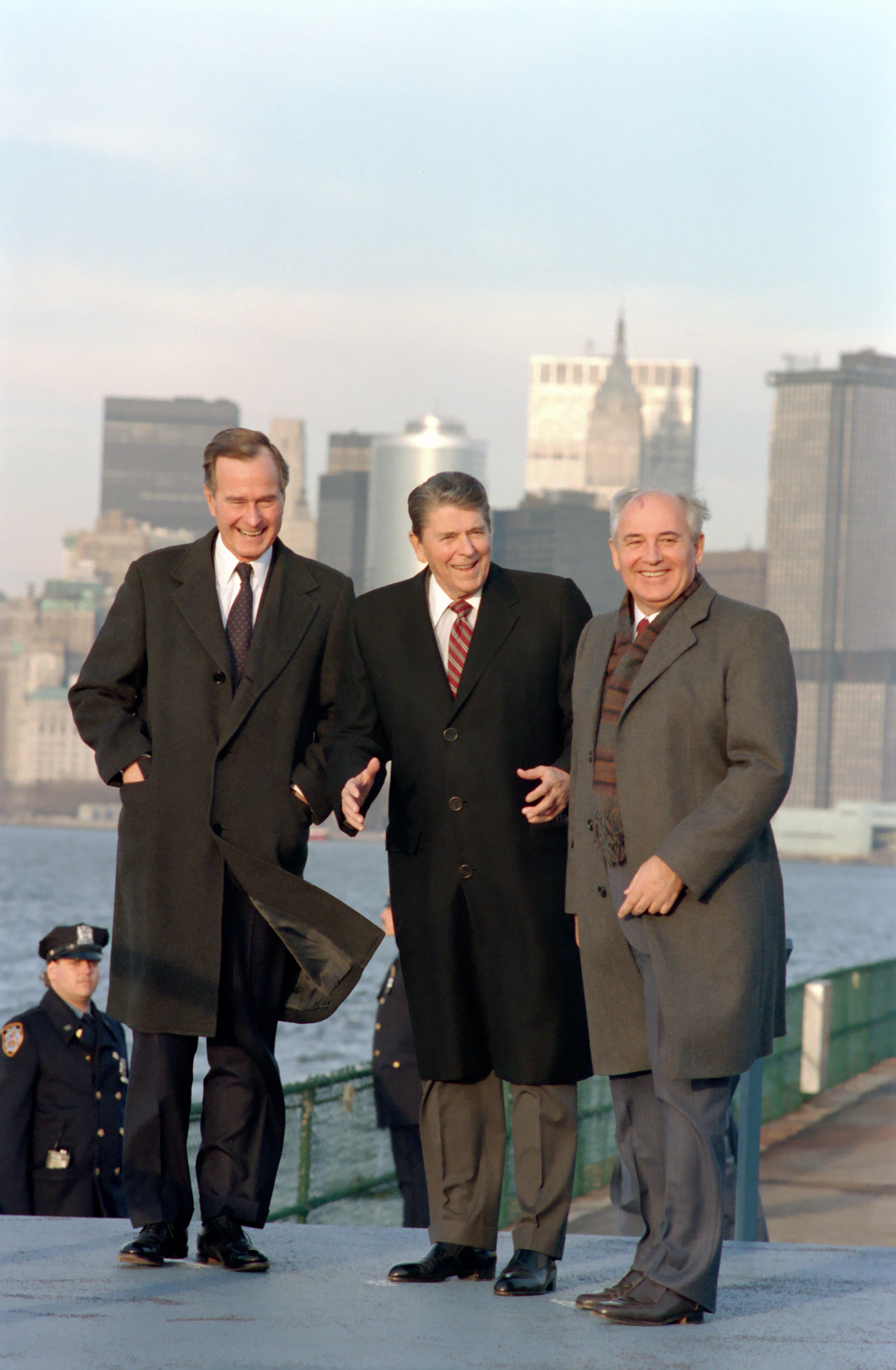
International policy with the buckling Soviet Union was a critical component of the political landscape in the late 1980s. Vice President, President-Elect Bush can be seen here standing with United States President Ronald Reagan and Soviet General Secretary Mikhail Gorbachev, on the New York waterfront, 1988.

The 1988 United States presidential election in New York took place on November 8, 1988, as part of the 1988 United States presidential election. Voters chose 36 representatives, or electors to the Electoral College, who voted for president and vice president.

New York was won by Democratic Governor Michael Dukakis of Massachusetts with 51.62% of the popular vote over Republican Vice President George H. W. Bush of Texas, who took 47.52%, a victory margin of 4.10%. This result made New York roughly 12% more Democratic than the nation-at-large. Dukakis’ statewide victory is largely attributable to winning four of five boroughs of New York City overall with 66.2% of the vote.

Bush became the first Republican to win the White House without carrying Broome County and the first to win the White House without carrying Montgomery County since Rutherford B. Hayes in 1876.

This was the last time until 2024 that the Republican candidate would receive at least 30% of the vote in New York City.

== Results ==
1988 United States presidential election in New York
Party	Candidate	Votes	Percentage	Electoral votes
Democratic	Michael Dukakis	3,255,487	50.19%	
Liberal	Michael Dukakis	92,395	1.42%	
Total	Michael Dukakis	3,347,882	51.62%	36
Republican	George H. W. Bush	2,838,414	43.76%	
Conservative	George H. W. Bush	243,457	3.75%	
Total	George H. W. Bush	3,081,871	47.52%	0
New York State Right to Life Party	William Marra	20,497	0.32%	0
New Alliance	Lenora Fulani	15,845	0.24%	0
Libertarian	Ron Paul	12,109	0.19%	0
Workers World	Larry Holmes	4,179	0.06%	0
Socialist Workers	James Warren	3,287	0.05%	0
Write-in	Edward Winn	10	0.00%	0
Write-in	Willa Kenoyer	3	0.00%	0
Totals		6,485,683	100.0%	36

=== New York City results ===
1988 Presidential Election in New York City		Manhattan	The Bronx	Brooklyn	Queens	Staten Island	Total	
Democratic- Liberal	Michael Dukakis	385,675	218,245	363,916	325,147	47,812	1,340,795	66.17%
Democratic- Liberal	Michael Dukakis	76.14%	73.22%	66.28%	59.47%	37.95%	1,340,795	66.17%
Republican- Conservative	George H. W. Bush	115,927	76,043	178,961	217,049	77,427	665,407	32.84%
Republican- Conservative	George H. W. Bush	22.89%	25.51%	32.60%	39.70%	61.46%	665,407	32.84%
New Alliance	Lenora Fulani	2,623	2,367	3,289	2,062	161	10,502	0.52%
New Alliance	Lenora Fulani	0.52%	0.79%	0.60%	0.38%	0.13%	10,502	0.52%
Right to Life	William Marra	678	718	1557	1355	332	4,640	0.23%
Right to Life	William Marra	0.13%	0.24%	0.28%	0.25%	0.26%	4,640	0.23%
Libertarian	Ron Paul	872	235	482	475	121	2,185	0.11%
Libertarian	Ron Paul	0.17%	0.08%	0.09%	0.09%	0.10%	2,185	0.11%
Socialist Workers	James Warren	475	266	480	368	72	1,661	0.08%
Socialist Workers	James Warren	0.09%	0.09%	0.09%	0.07%	0.06%	1,661	0.08%
Workers’ World	Larry Holmes	301	207	334	273	50	1,165	0.06%
Workers’ World	Larry Holmes	0.06%	0.07%	0.06%	0.07%	0.04%	1,165	0.06%
TOTAL		506,551	298,081	549,019	546,729	125,975	2,026,355	100.00%

=== Results by county ===
County	Michael Dukakis Democratic/Liberal		George H.W. Bush Republican/Conservative		Various candidates Other parties		Margin		Total votes cast
County	#	%	#	%	#	%	#	%	Total votes cast
Albany	86,564	58.70%	59,534	40.37%	1,363	0.92%	27,030	18.33%	147,461
Allegany	5,614	31.85%	11,880	67.40%	132	0.75%	-6,266	-35.55%	17,626
Bronx	218,245	73.22%	76,043	25.51%	3,793	1.27%	142,202	47.71%	298,081
Broome	48,130	49.95%	47,610	49.41%	625	0.65%	520	0.54%	96,365
Cattaraugus	12,447	38.38%	19,691	60.72%	290	0.89%	-7,244	-22.34%	32,428
Cayuga	15,044	46.60%	16,934	52.45%	307	0.95%	-1,890	-5.85%	32,285
Chautauqua	25,814	44.61%	31,642	54.68%	411	0.71%	-5,828	-10.07%	57,867
Chemung	15,966	42.99%	20,951	56.41%	222	0.60%	-4,985	-13.42%	37,139
Chenango	8,021	40.30%	11,727	58.92%	154	0.77%	-3,706	-18.62%	19,902
Clinton	12,670	44.36%	15,702	54.97%	191	0.67%	-3,032	-10.61%	28,563
Columbia	11,585	43.03%	15,111	56.12%	228	0.85%	-3,526	-13.09%	26,924
Cortland	7,673	40.88%	10,934	58.26%	162	0.86%	-3,261	-17.38%	18,769
Delaware	7,463	39.26%	11,391	59.92%	156	0.82%	-3,928	-20.66%	19,010
Dutchess	38,968	38.22%	62,165	60.97%	826	0.81%	-23,197	-22.75%	101,959
Erie	238,779	55.43%	188,796	43.83%	3,217	0.75%	49,983	11.60%	430,792
Essex	6,623	38.70%	10,350	60.48%	140	0.82%	-3,727	-21.78%	17,113
Franklin	7,928	46.11%	9,135	53.14%	129	0.75%	-1,207	-7.03%	17,192
Fulton	9,012	43.06%	11,757	56.17%	162	0.77%	-2,745	-13.11%	20,931
Genesee	9,945	40.87%	14,182	58.29%	205	0.84%	-4,237	-17.42%	24,332
Greene	7,265	37.61%	11,874	61.46%	180	0.93%	-4,609	-23.85%	19,319
Hamilton	976	29.42%	2,320	69.94%	21	0.63%	-1,344	-40.52%	3,317
Herkimer	12,694	45.30%	15,104	53.90%	224	0.80%	-2,410	-8.60%	28,022
Jefferson	14,137	42.05%	19,304	57.41%	181	0.54%	-5,167	-15.36%	33,622
Kings	363,916	66.28%	178,961	32.60%	6,142	1.12%	184,955	33.68%	549,019
Lewis	4,252	41.94%	5,787	57.08%	99	0.98%	-1,535	-15.14%	10,138
Livingston	9,506	40.11%	14,004	59.10%	187	0.79%	-4,498	-18.99%	23,697
Madison	10,665	41.41%	14,902	57.86%	187	0.73%	-4,237	-16.45%	25,754
Monroe	153,650	49.33%	155,271	49.85%	2,545	0.82%	-1,621	-0.52%	311,466
Montgomery	11,371	50.13%	11,128	49.05%	186	0.82%	243	1.08%	22,685
Nassau	250,130	42.22%	337,430	56.96%	4,858	0.82%	-87,300	-14.74%	592,418
New York	385,675	76.14%	115,927	22.89%	4,949	0.98%	269,748	53.25%	506,551
Niagara	43,801	50.42%	42,537	48.97%	530	0.61%	1,264	1.45%	86,868
Oneida	47,665	46.07%	55,039	53.20%	757	0.73%	-7,374	-7.13%	103,461
Onondaga	94,751	47.26%	104,080	51.91%	1,654	0.82%	-9,329	-4.65%	200,485
Ontario	17,341	43.97%	21,780	55.23%	314	0.80%	-4,439	-11.26%	39,435
Orange	38,465	36.70%	65,446	62.44%	899	0.86%	-26,981	-25.74%	104,810
Orleans	5,913	39.28%	9,028	59.97%	114	0.76%	-3,115	-20.69%	15,055
Oswego	18,430	41.69%	25,362	57.37%	419	0.95%	-6,932	-15.68%	44,211
Otsego	11,069	45.49%	13,021	53.51%	245	1.01%	-1,952	-8.02%	24,335
Putnam	12,158	33.31%	24,086	65.99%	256	0.70%	-11,928	-32.68%	36,500
Queens	325,147	59.47%	217,049	39.70%	4,533	0.83%	108,098	19.77%	546,729
Rensselaer	33,066	47.79%	35,412	51.18%	719	1.04%	-2,346	-3.39%	69,197
Richmond	47,812	37.95%	77,427	61.46%	736	0.58%	-29,615	-23.51%	125,975
Rockland	47,634	42.42%	63,825	56.83%	842	0.75%	-16,191	-14.41%	112,301
St. Lawrence	18,921	47.92%	20,290	51.39%	270	0.68%	-1,369	-3.47%	39,481
Saratoga	31,684	41.81%	43,498	57.39%	606	0.80%	-11,814	-15.58%	75,788
Schenectady	36,483	51.83%	33,364	47.40%	539	0.77%	3,119	4.43%	70,386
Schoharie	5,389	42.99%	7,008	55.90%	139	1.11%	-1,619	-12.91%	12,536
Schuyler	2,900	40.04%	4,291	59.25%	51	0.70%	-1,391	-19.21%	7,242
Seneca	6,215	45.80%	7,221	53.21%	135	0.99%	-1,006	-7.41%	13,571
Steuben	12,824	33.34%	25,359	65.93%	283	0.74%	-12,535	-32.59%	38,466
Suffolk	199,215	38.73%	311,242	60.51%	3,893	0.76%	-112,027	-21.78%	514,350
Sullivan	11,635	42.20%	15,713	57.00%	220	0.80%	-4,078	-14.80%	27,568
Tioga	8,102	38.68%	12,670	60.49%	174	0.83%	-4,568	-21.81%	20,946
Tompkins	21,455	58.46%	14,932	40.69%	312	0.85%	6,523	17.77%	36,699
Ulster	30,744	42.37%	41,173	56.75%	640	0.88%	-10,429	-14.38%	72,557
Warren	8,580	34.85%	15,860	64.41%	182	0.74%	-7,280	-29.56%	24,622
Washington	8,201	36.42%	14,103	62.64%	211	0.94%	-5,902	-26.22%	22,515
Wayne	12,959	38.22%	20,613	60.80%	330	0.97%	-7,654	-22.58%	33,902
Westchester	169,860	45.78%	197,956	53.36%	3,192	0.86%	-28,096	-7.58%	371,008
Wyoming	5,228	35.17%	9,451	63.59%	184	1.24%	-4,223	-28.42%	14,863
Yates	3,507	38.65%	5,488	60.48%	79	0.87%	-1,981	-21.83%	9,074
Totals	3,347,882	51.62%	3,081,871	47.52%	55,930	0.86%	266,011	4.10%	6,485,683

==== Counties that flipped from Republican to Democratic ====
- Broome
- Montgomery
- Niagara
- Schenectady

== Analysis ==
This was the last election in which a Republican presidential nominee won heavily populated Westchester County, as well as Monroe, Onondaga, and Ulster Counties, and also the last election in which New York was decided by a single-digit margin. Beginning in 1992, the Democrats would make substantial inroads in the suburbs around New York City as well as parts of upstate, making New York a solid blue state that has gone Democratic by double-digit margins in every election since. Consequently, this is the last time a Democrat lost the state outside of the five boroughs of New York City until 2024. Rensselaer, Franklin, and St. Lawrence counties would not vote Republican again until 2016. Nassau County would not vote Republican again until 2024.

== See also ==
- United States presidential elections in New York
- Presidency of George H. W. Bush
