= John F. Crosby =

John F. Crosby may refer to:

- John F. Crosby (attorney), American attorney
- John F. Crosby (philosopher), American philosopher
