= 1988 New Jersey Democratic presidential primary =

1988 New Jersey Democratic presidential primaries
- June 7, 1988
- Presidential delegate primary

118 Democratic National Convention delegates
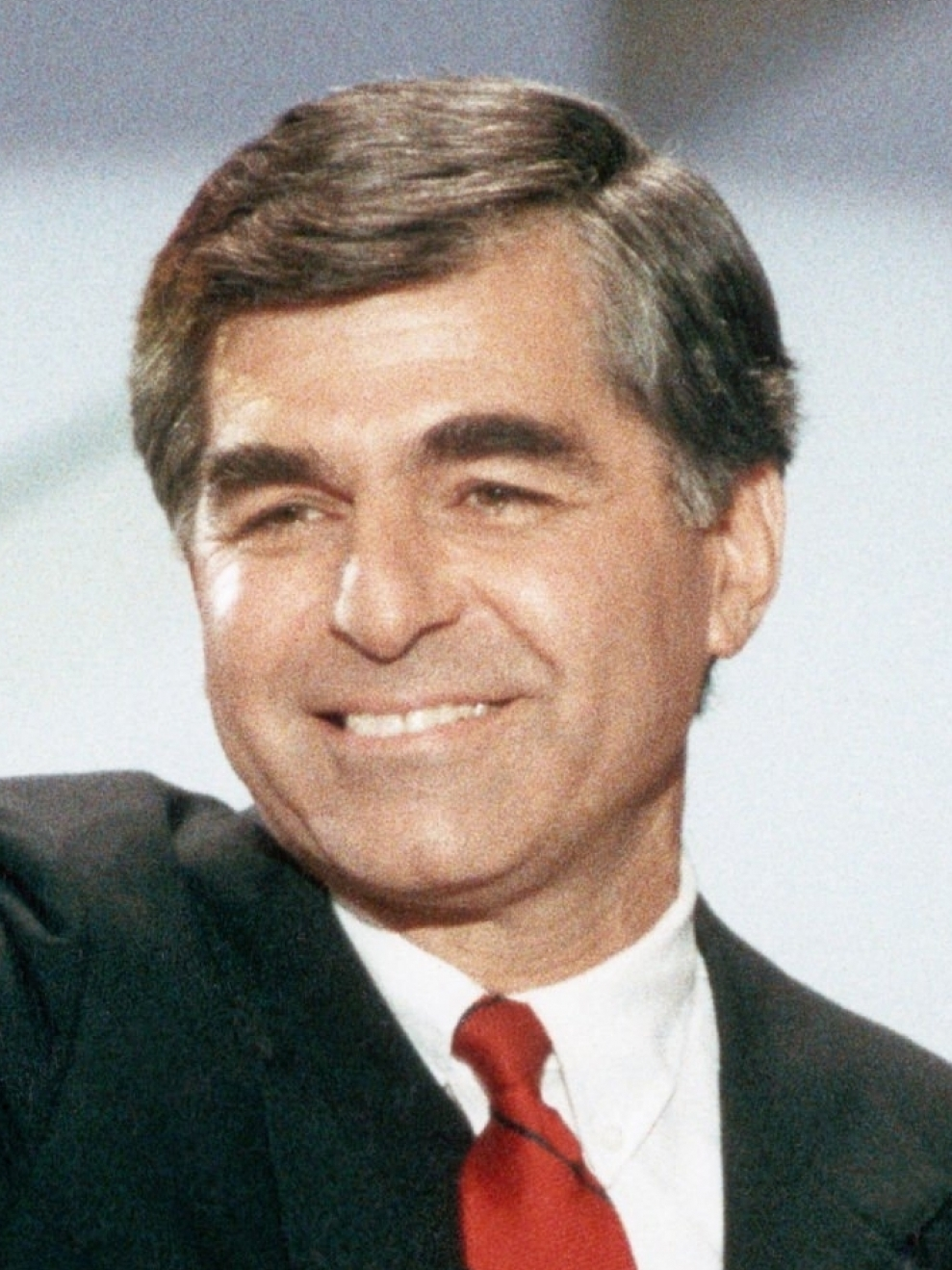

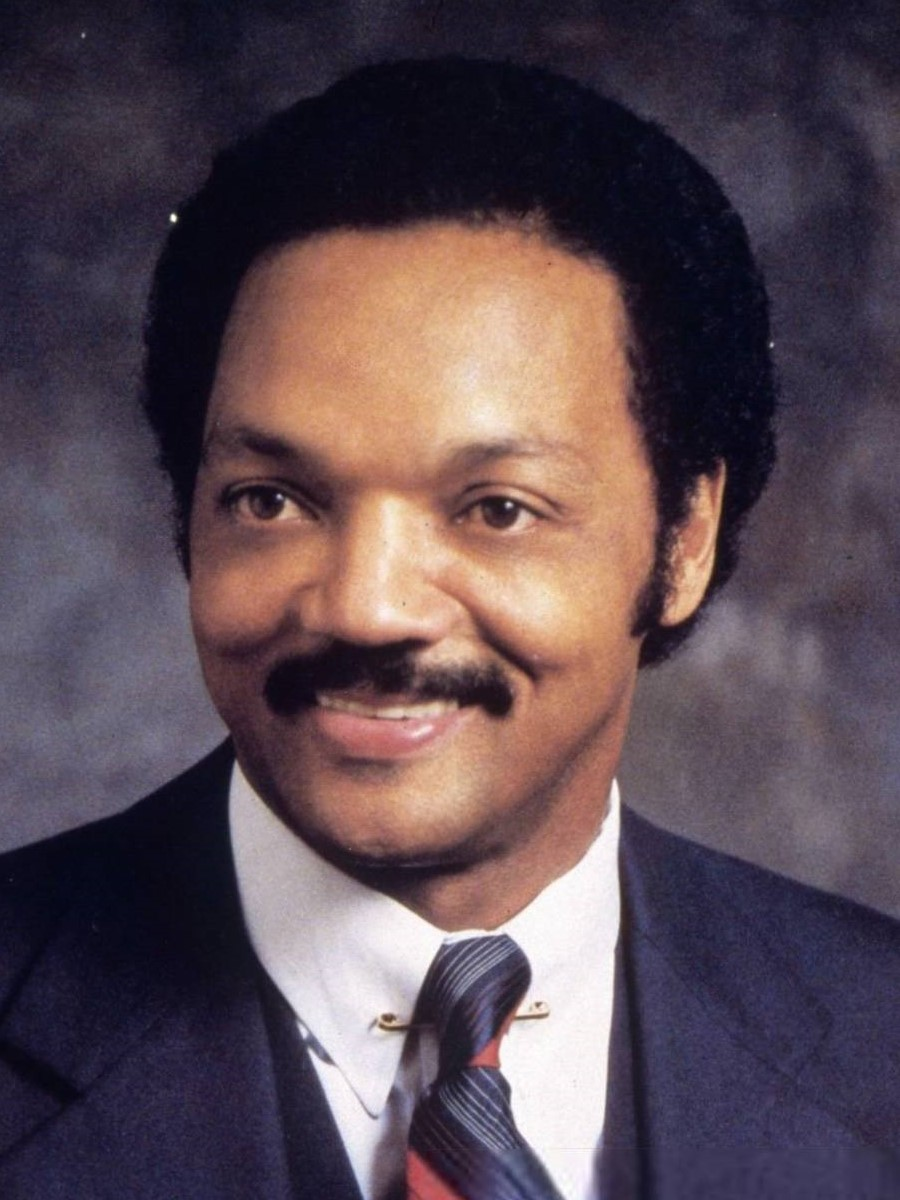
Candidate	Michael Dukakis	Jesse Jackson
Home state	Massachusetts	Illinois
Delegate count	66	34
- Presidential preference primary (non-binding)

No Democratic National Convention delegates
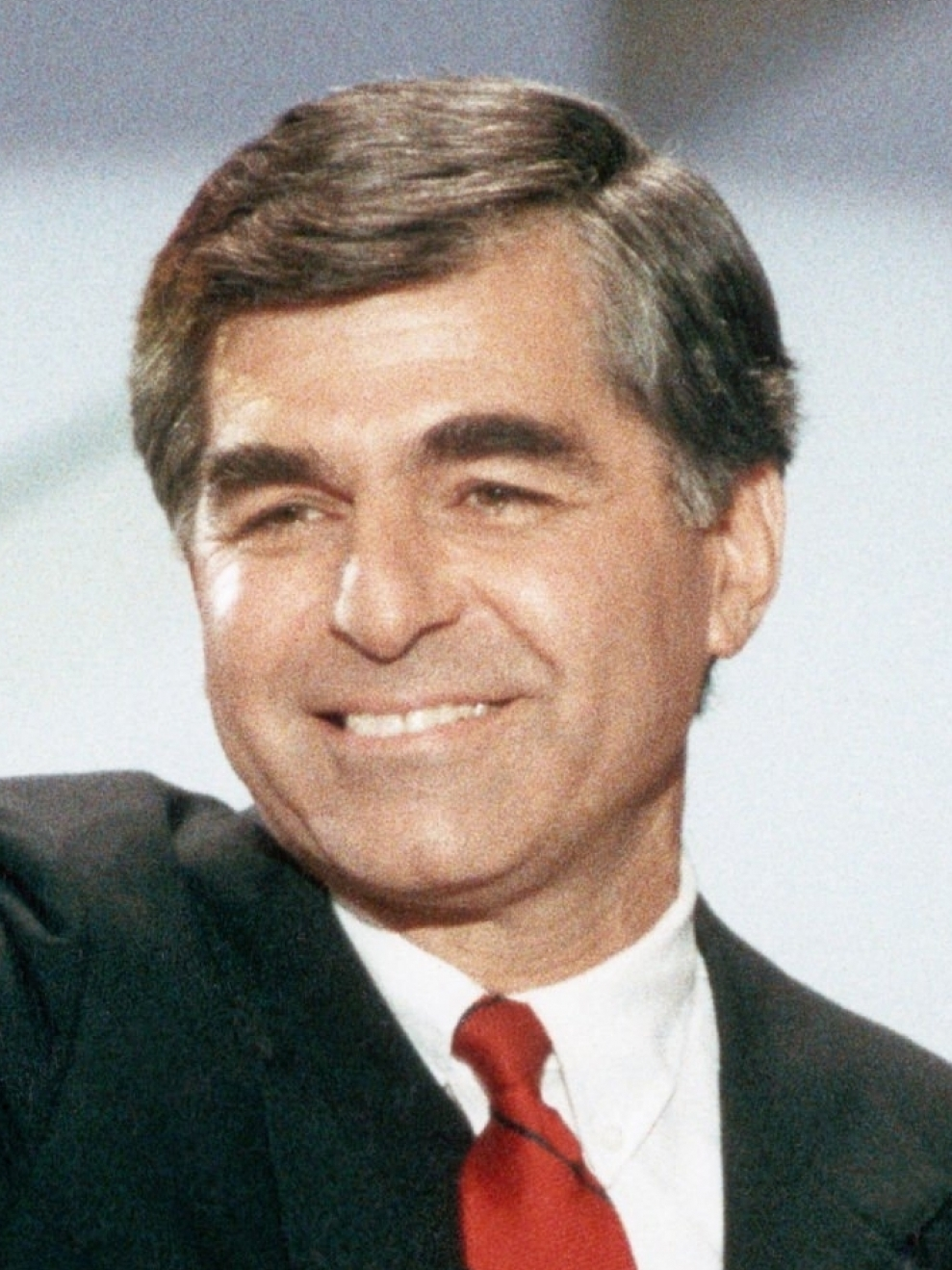

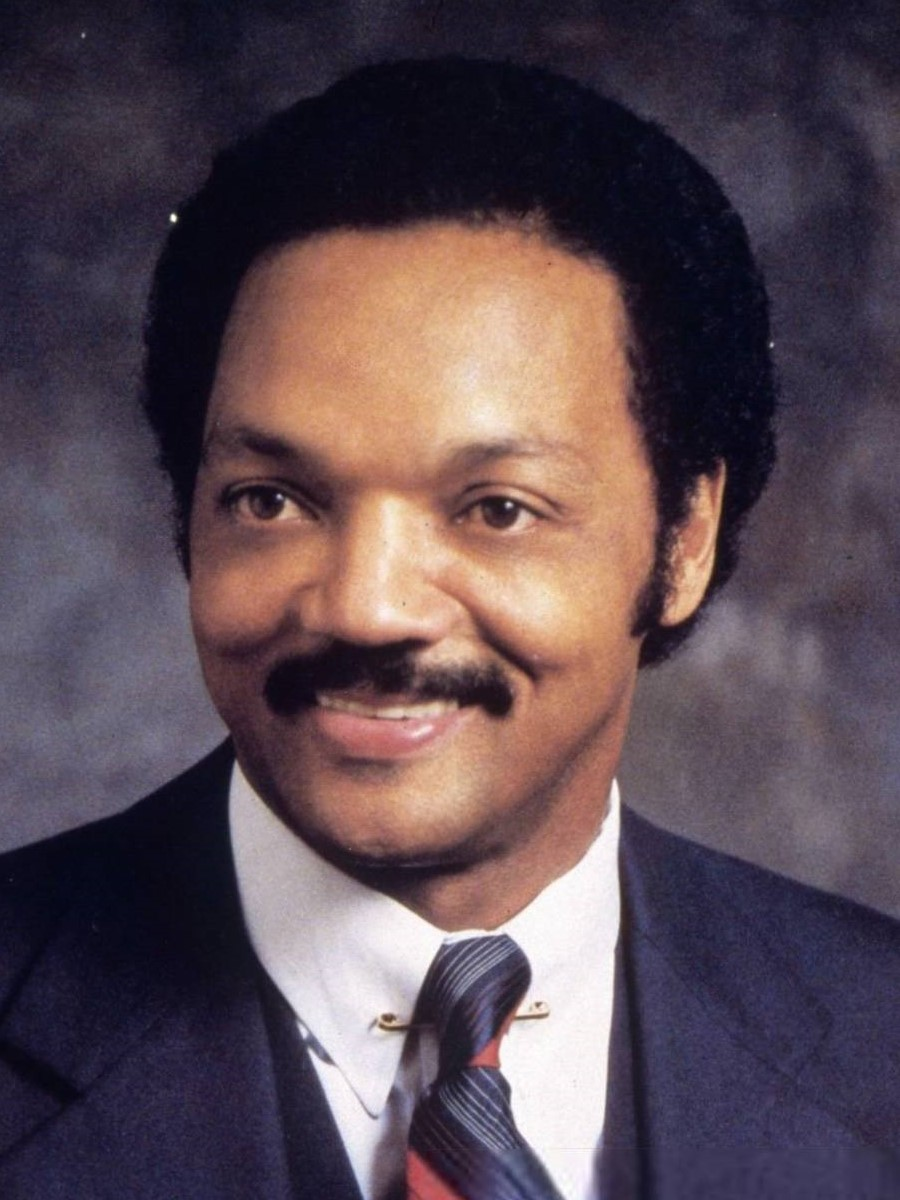
Candidate	Michael Dukakis	Jesse Jackson
Home state	Massachusetts	Illinois
Popular vote	414,829	213,705
Percentage	63.4%	32.7%
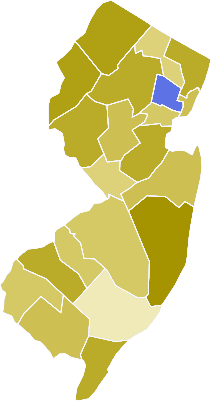
- Preference primary results by county

The 1988 New Jersey Democratic presidential primary was held on June 7, 1988, in New Jersey as one of the Democratic Party's statewide nomination contests ahead of the 1988 United States presidential election. Massachusetts governor Michael Dukakis won over civil rights activist Jesse Jackson, winning 63 percent of the vote and the bulk of the state's 110 pledged delegates. Dukakis's victory came near the end of a long primary campaign and, along with a victory in the California primary on the same day, put him on the precipice of the nomination. He was ultimately carried over the top at the 1988 Democratic National Convention by the support of superdelegates.

After the primary, state Democratic leaders awarded Jackson additional delegates to provide him representation proportional to his popular vote in the state.

== Background ==
Entering the 1988 New Jersey primary, Michael Dukakis had cemented his position as the front-runner for the party nomination over Jesse Jackson, following the withdrawal of other contenders like Al Gore. Although he still had not won sufficient delegate pledges to secure the nomination on the first ballot, Dukakis had been the leading candidate in the race for weeks and his nomination was considered inevitable.

== Candidates ==
- David Duke, Grand Wizard of the Ku Klux Klan (also running as Populist nominee)
- Michael Dukakis, Governor of Massachusetts
- Jesse Jackson, Baptist minister and activist
- Lyndon LaRouche, perennial candidate and activist
- William A. Marra, anti-abortion activist (also running as Right to Life nominee)

=== Withdrew ===
- Al Gore, U.S. senator from Tennessee

== Endorsements ==
Michael Dukakis

U.S. senators

- Bill Bradley, U.S. senator since 1979

State senators

- John F. Russo, president of the New Jersey Senate, state senator from the 10th district, and candidate for governor in 1985

== Campaign ==
A February straw poll of business leaders taken at the New Jersey Chamber of Commerce convention found Dukakis leading with 32 percent of the vote, followed by Jackson with 16 percent, U.S. senator Paul Simon of Illinois with 15 percent, former Arizona governor Bruce Babbitt with 11 percent; U.S. representative Dick Gephardt of Missouri with10 percent, and Al Gore and Gary Hart each with 8 percent.

== Results ==
1988 New Jersey Democratic presidential primary
Party	Candidate	Votes	%
Democratic	Michael Dukakis	414,829	63.40%
Democratic	Jesse Jackson	213,705	32.66%
Democratic	Al Gore (withdrew)	18,062	2.76%
Democratic	Lyndon LaRouche	2,621	0.40%
Democratic	William A. Marra	2,594	0.40%
Democratic	David Duke	2,491	0.38%
Total votes		654,302	100.00%

=== Exit polling ===
An exit poll conducted by The New York Times and CBS News indicated that Dukakis had improved his standing with blue-collar voters, with each candidate getting about half, and white voters, with Dukakis winning about 89 percent.

Unlike previous New Jersey primaries, most voters decided on a candidate well in advance, with 76 percent reporting that they had decided on a candidate more than two weeks before the primary. Among those who had decided before the beginning of the year, Jackson won 60 percent. Despite Jackson's emphasis of on poverty and drugs, Dukakis won voters who cited each as their top issue. Jackson improved with black New Jersey voters over his performance in 1984, but performed worse with white voters than he had in 1984 and performed significantly worse with white voters than he had in the earlier primaries in neighboring Pennsylvania and New York.

== Aftermath ==
The 1988 primary was one of the least competitive in New Jersey in the modern era, leading to calls to move the New Jersey primary earlier in the cycle.

After the primary, Jackson's supporters challenged the system which awarded him only 12 percent of the delegates despite getting 33 percent of the statewide popular vote. In response, the state Democratic Party awarded him an additional eight delegates on June 21 to the nine he won at the primary, for a total of seventeen. Academy Award-winning actress Olympia Dukakis, the candidate's cousin, was named an at-large delegate.
