= Adolf Reinach =

German philosopher (1883–1917)

- Born: Adolf Bernhard Philipp Reinach; 23 December 1883; Mainz, Grand Duchy of Hesse, German Empire
- Died: 16 November 1917 (aged 33) near Diksmuide, Belgium

Education
- Education: Ludwig-Maximilians-Universität München; University of Göttingen; University of Tübingen
- Doctoral advisor: Theodor Lipps
- Other advisor: Edmund Husserl

Philosophical work
- Era: 20th-century philosophy
- Region: Western philosophy
- School: Munich phenomenology
- Institutions: University of Göttingen
- Notable students: Hedwig Conrad-Martius; Dietrich von Hildebrand
- Main interests: Epistemology, legal theory
- Notable ideas: Theory of negative judgement (Theorie des negativen Urteils); Negative states of affairs

Adolf Bernhard Philipp Reinach (/ˈraɪnɑːx/; German: [ˈʁaɪnax]; 23 December 1883 – 16 November 1917) was a German philosopher associated with the Munich phenomenology school.

== Life and work ==
Adolf Reinach was born into a prominent Jewish family in Mainz, Germany, on 23 December 1883.

Adolf Reinach studied at the Ostergymnasium in Mainz and later entered the Ludwig-Maximilians-Universität München in 1901, where he studied mainly psychology and philosophy under Theodor Lipps. In the circle of Lipps' students, he came in contact with Moritz Geiger, Otto Selz, Aloys Fischer and above all Johannes Daubert. From 1903 to 1904 onwards, he was increasingly busy with the works of Edmund Husserl, especially his Logische Untersuchungen (Logical Investigations).

In 1904, Reinach obtained his doctorate in philosophy under Lipps with his work Über den Ursachenbegriff im geltenden Strafrecht (On the concept of cause in penal law). In 1905, he still intended to continue his studies in Munich (where in the meanwhile he had also befriended Alexander Pfänder), to obtain a degree in law, but then decided to go to study with Husserl at the University of Göttingen. In that period, more students of Lipps (captained by Daubert) had decided to abandon Munich and to head for Göttingen, inspired by Husserl's works (which is referred to as the Munich invasion of Göttingen).

Later in 1905, Reinach returned to Munich to complete his studies in law and then continued in 1906-1907 at the University of Tübingen. He attended several lectures and seminars on penal law by the legal theorist Ernst Beling, by which he was quite impressed and to which he owes a great deal of inspiration of his later works. In the summer of 1907 he took the First State Examination in Law, but also went later to Göttingen to attend discussion circles with Husserl.

With the support of Husserl, Reinach was able to obtain habilitation for university teaching at Göttingen in 1909. From his lectures and research, we can see that at the time he was influenced also by Anton Marty and Johannes Daubert, besides obviously and greatly by Husserl. On his turn Reinach appears to have inspired several young phenomenologists (like Wilhelm Schapp, Dietrich von Hildebrand, Alexandre Koyré and Edith Stein) with his lectures. Besides giving an introduction to phenomenology, he lectured i.a. on Plato and Immanuel Kant.

In this period, Husserl embarked on a thorough revision of his main work, the Logical Investigations, and asked Reinach's assistance in this endeavour. Moreover, in 1912 Reinach, together with Moritz Geiger and Alexander Pfänder founded the famous Jahrbuch für Philosophie und phänomenologische Forschung, with Husserl as main editor.

Besides his work in the area of phenomenology and philosophy in general, Reinach is credited for the development of a forerunner to the theory of speech acts by Austin and Searle: Die apriorischen Grundlagen des bürgerlichen Rechtes (The A Priori Foundations of Civil Law) is a systematic treatment of social acts as performative utterances and a priori foundations of civil law. Reinach's work was based mostly on Husserl's analysis of meaning in the Logical Investigations, but also on Daubert's criticism of it. Alexander Pfänder (1870–1941) had also been doing research on commands, promises and the like in the same period.

After Husserl's publication of the Ideen (Ideas) in 1913, many phenomenologists took a critical stance towards his new theories and the current of Munich phenomenology came effectively into being, as Reinach, Daubert and others chose to remain closer to Husserl's earlier work, the Logical Investigations. Instead of following Husserl into idealism and transcendental phenomenology, the Munich group remained a realist current.

Reinach was converted to Lutheranism along with his wife.

At the outbreak of World War I Reinach volunteered to join the army. After many battles and having received the Iron Cross, Reinach fell outside Diksmuide in Flanders on 16 November 1917.

After his death, Edith Stein was given the task of arranging his manuscript writings. Reinach had said shortly before his death that he would only teach philosophy in the future as a means of leading men to God, and this may have been reflected in these writings. But Edith Stein was impressed by the resignation and faith of his widow. She wrote, "This was my first encounter with the Cross and the divine power it imparts to those who bear it ... it was the moment when my unbelief collapsed and Christ began to shine his light on me – Christ in the mystery of the Cross." Several years later she became a Christian and a Carmelite nun.

== Selected works ==
- Über den Ursachenbegriff im geltenden Strafrecht, Leipzig: J. A. Barth 1905, English translation: "On the Concept of Causality in the Criminal Law," Libertarian Papers 1, 35 (2009).
- "William James und der Pragmatismus," in Welt und Wissen. Hannoversche Blätter für Kunst, Literatur und Leben (198): 45–65 1910.
- "Kants Auffassung des Humeschen Problems" in Zeitschrift für Philosophie und philosophische Kritik 141: 176–209 1911.
- "Die obersten Regeln der Vernunftschlüsse bei Kant" in Kant Studien 16: 214–233 1911.
- Zur Theorie des negativen Urteils. in Münchener Philosophische Abhandlungen. Festschrift für Theodor Lipps. Ed. A. Pfänder. Leipzig: J. A. Barth, 1911. pp. 196–254
- "Die Überlegung: ihre ethische und rechtliche Bedeutung I" in Zeitschrift für Philosophie und philosophische Kritik 148: 181–196 1912.
- "Die Überlegung: ihre ethische und rechtliche Bedeutung II" in Zeitschrift für Philosophie und philosophische Kritik 149: 30–58 1913.
- "Die apriorischen Grundlagen des bürgerlichen Rechtes" in Jahrbuch für Philosophie und phänomenologische Forschung 1: 685–847 1913.
  - Also as a special edition (Sonderdruck), Verlag von Max Niemeyer, Halle a. d. S. (pp. 1–163), 1913.
  - Re-edited as: "Zur Phänomenologie des Rechts. Die apriorischen Grundlagen des bürgerlichen Rechts" (with a preface by Anna Reinach) Munich, Kösel, 1953.
- "Paul Natorps 'Allgemeine Psychologie nach kritischer Methode'" in Göttingische gelehrte Anzeigen 4: 193–214 1914.

His collected works: Sämtliche Werke. Kritische Ausgabe mit Kommentar (in two volumes). München: Philosophia Verlag 1989. Eds. K. Schuhmann & B. Smith. Some online texts and translations of works by Reinach are available here.
