= Munich phenomenology =

Munich phenomenology (also the Munich phenomenological school) is the philosophical orientation of a group of philosophers and psychologists that studied and worked in Munich at the turn of the twentieth century. Their views are grouped under the names realist (also realistic) phenomenology or phenomenology of essences. Munich phenomenology represents one branch of what is referred to as the early phenomenology. One of their contributions was the theory that there are different kinds of intentionality.

== History ==
In 1895, a number of students working with the psychologist Theodor Lipps at the Ludwig-Maximilians-Universität München (LMU) founded the Psychologischer Verein ("Psychological Association"). An account stated that this association emerged from a reading group, which was occupied by the works of the School of Brentano. Out of this development emerged the notion that Edmund Husserl became the successor to Franz Brentano's Austrian philosophy. It is said that the Austrian phenomenology had been distinct from everything within the phenomenological movement such as the German and French strands, but it had identifiable historical ties with the Munich phenomenological school. This relationship is also partly attributed to Husserl and Hans Cornelius.

A number of the participants in the student association, notably Johannes Daubert, Moritz Geiger, Alexander Pfänder, and Adolf Reinach, were inspired by Edmund Husserl's Logical Investigations (1900/01). The book was critical of the psychologist of their teacher (Lipps), and presented a new way of doing philosophy, known as "phenomenology." Choosing to align themselves with Husserl, they became the Munich Circle of phenomenologists. While Cornelius' early work was rejected by the phenomenologists, his succeeding essays were embraced for their discussions of Brentano, Carl Stumpf, and Alexius Meinong's works.

A notable aspect to Munich phenomenology was the extension of the realist analysis of the a priori knowledge to different kinds of entities and domains such as the psychology of willing and motivation. It was Pfänder, a leding representative of the Munich Phenomenology, who wrote the 1911 essay on this subject entitled Motive and Motivation. Husserl considered this an important work, and it inspired him to publish a series of analyses of volitional consciousness. Husserl previously focused on "concrete" analyses founded on arithmetic and logic. He would only broaden his phenomenology later when he started addressing the a priori structures of consciousness.

Around 1905, many of Lipps' students (following the lead of Daubert) temporarily abandoned the Ludwig-Maximilians-Universität München and headed to the University of Göttingen to study with Husserl directly. This is referred to as the "Munich invasion of Göttingen," and is generally considered to be the starting point of the phenomenological movement proper. The arrival of students from LMU eventually led to the establishment of a similar student group at the University of Göttingen circa 1910, known as the "Göttingen Circle."

In 1912, the Jahrbuch für Philosophie und phänomenologische Forschung was founded with Husserl, Geiger, Reinach, Pfänder, and Max Scheler as its editors. After Husserl's publication of the Ideen zu einer reinen Phänomenologie und phänomenologischen Philosophie. Erstes Buch (Ideas I) in the first edition of the Jahrbuch, a number of his followers took a critical stance towards Husserl's new vision of phenomenology. Many members of the Munich group distanced themselves from Husserl's idealism and his transcendental phenomenology, preferring the earlier realist phenomenology of the first edition of the Logical Investigations.

== The Munich phenomenologists ==
- Theodor Conrad
- Johannes Daubert
- Moritz Geiger
- Alexander Pfänder
- Adolf Reinach
- Max Scheler

== Other members of the Munich Circle and the Psychologische Verein ==
- Ernst von Aster
- Matthias Baumgartner
- Hedwig Conrad-Martius
- Ludwig Curtis
- Wolf Dohrn
- August Endell
- Aloys Fischer
- August Gallinger
- Dietrich von Hildebrand
- Rudolf Hirsch
- Edgar Istel
- Theodor Lessing
- Hans von Liebig
- Otto Selz
- Wilhelm Schapp
- Eduard Schmidt
- Alfred Schwenninger
- Else Voigtländer

== Sources ==
- Karl Schuhmann, "Philosophy and Art in Munich around the turn of the Century," in Poznan Studies in the Philosophy of the Sciences and the Humanities, Vol. 54, 1997, pp. 35–51.
- Karl Schuhmann and Barry Smith, "Adolf Reinach: An Intellectual Biography," in Speech Act and Sachverhalt: Adolf Reinach and the Foundations of Realist Phenomenology, ed. Kevin Mulligan, Springer, 1987, pp. 1–27.
- Barry Smith, "Realistic Phenomenology”, in L. Embree (ed.), Encyclopedia of Phenomenology, Dordrecht/Boston/London: Kluwer, 1997, 586–590.
- Josef Seifert and Cheikh Mbacke Gueye (Eds.), Anthologie der Realistischen Phänomenologie, Walter de Gruyter, 2009.
- Herbert Spiegelberg, The Phenomenological Movement (The Hague/Boston/London 1982)
- Helmut Kuhn, Ederhard Avé-Lallemant, R. Gladiator (Eds.), Die Münchener Phänomenologie, Phaenomenologica 65, 1976
