= Dietrich Mahnke =

German philosopher and historian of mathematics (1884 – 1939)

Dietrich Mahnke (17 October 1884, Verden – 25 July 1939, Fürth) was a German philosopher and historian of mathematics.

== Biography ==
From 1902–1906, Mahnke studied at Göttingen under Edmund Husserl and David Hilbert. After serving in the First World War (stationed in Lens, France), he graduated from the University of Freiburg in 1925 with a thesis on Leibniz. The thesis was later published in the Jahrbuch für Philosophie und phänomenologische Forschung as Leibnizens Synthese von Universalmathematik und Individualmetaphysik. In 1926 he habilitated at Greifswald with a thesis entitled Neue Einblicke in die Entdeckungsgeschichte der höheren Analysis. In 1927 he became a professor of philosophy at Marburg.

In 1934 he became a member of the Nazi SA.

Mahnke's work in the history of mathematics focussed primarily on Leibniz's development of the infinitesimal calculus, and his relationship to Neo-Platonism. His last book, Unendliche Sphäre und Allmittelpunkt, Beiträge zur Genealogie der mathematischen Mystik was a study of the use of mathematical symbolism, especially the notion of "infinite spheres", in religious mysticism. At the time of his death, Mahnke was editing a volume of Leibniz's mathematical correspondence. This project was then taken over by Joseph Ehrenfried Hofmann.

Mahnke was killed in a car accident.

His Nachlass is preserved at the University of Marburg.

== Bibliography ==
Leibniz als Gegner der Gelehrteneinseitigkeit (1912)
Der Wille der Ewigkeit (1917)
Eine Neue Monadologie (1917)
Die Neubelebung der Leibnizschen Weltanschauung (1920)
Ewigkeit und Gegenwart, Eine Fichtische Zusammenschau (1922)
Von Hilbert zu Husserl, Erste Einführung in die Phänomenologie, besonders die formale Mathematik (1923)
Leibniz und Goethe: die Harmonie ihrer Weltansichten (1924)
Neue Einblicke in die Entdeckungsgeschichte der höheren Analysis (1926)
Ein unbekanntes Selbstzeugnis Leibnizens aus seiner Erziehertätigkeit (1931)
Unendliche Sphäre und Allmittelpunkt, Beiträge zur Genealogie der mathematischen Mystik (1937)
Die Rationalisierung der Mystik bei Leibniz und Kant (1939)

== Sources ==
- Joseph W. Dauben, Christoph J. Scriba (ed.): Writing the History of Mathematics – Its Historical Development. Birkhäuser, Basel 2002, ISBN 978-3-7643-6167-9
- Gerhard Biller (1987). "Mahnke, Dietrich". Neue Deutsche Biographie (in German). Vol. 15. Berlin: Duncker & Humblot. pp. 691–692.
