= Lipps–Meyer law =

The Lipps–Meyer law, named for Theodor Lipps (1851–1914) and Max Friedrich Meyer (1873–1967), hypothesizes that the closure of melodic intervals is determined by "whether or not the end tone of the interval can be represented by the number two or a power of two", in the frequency ratio between notes (see octave).

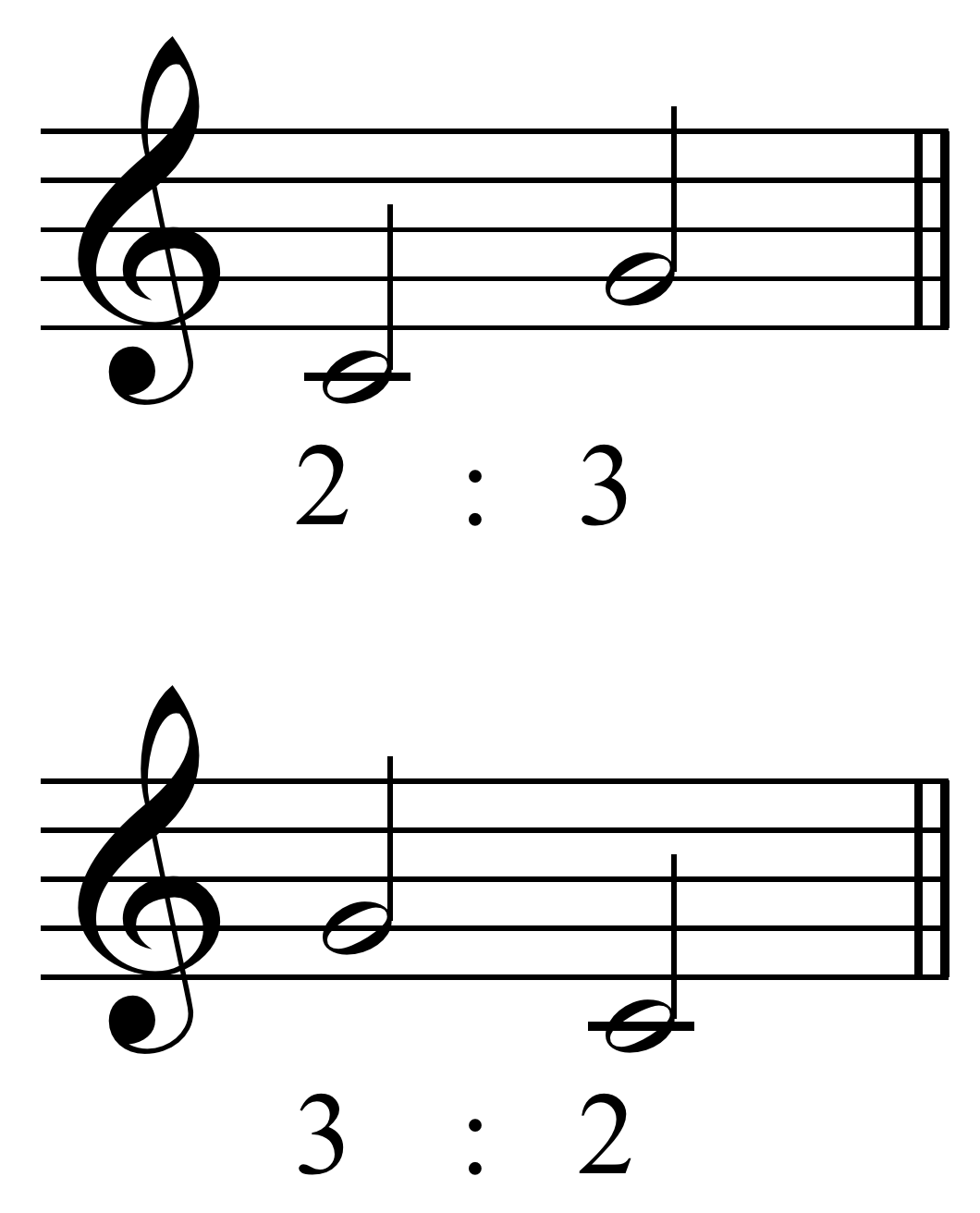
Perfect fifth.

"The 'Lipps–Meyer' Law predicts an 'effect of finality' for a melodic interval that ends on a tone which, in terms of an idealized frequency ratio, can be represented as a power of two."

Thus the interval order matters — a perfect fifth, for instance (C,G), ordered ⟨C,G⟩, 2:3, gives an "effect of indicated continuation", while ⟨G,C⟩, 3:2, gives an "effect of finality".

This is a measure of interval strength or stability and finality. Notice that it is similar to the more common measure of interval strength, which is determined by its approximation to a lower, stronger, or higher, weaker, position in the harmonic series.

The reason for the effect of finality of such interval ratios may be seen as follows. If $F = h_2/2^n$ is the interval ratio in consideration, where $n$ is a positive integer and $h_2$ is the higher harmonic number of the ratio, then its interval in semitones can be determined by taking the base-2 logarithm $I=12\log_2(h_2/2^n)=12\log_2(h_2) - 12n$. For example, a ratio of 3:2 gives $I\approx7.02$, about seven semitones, and a ratio of 4:3 gives $I\approx4.98$, about five semitones. The difference of these terms is the harmonic series representation of the interval in question (using harmonic numbers), whose bottom note $12n$ is a transposition of the tonic by n octaves. This suggests why descending interval ratios with denominator a power of two are final. A similar situation is seen if the term in the numerator is a power of two.
