= Robert Vischer =

German philosopher (1847–1933)

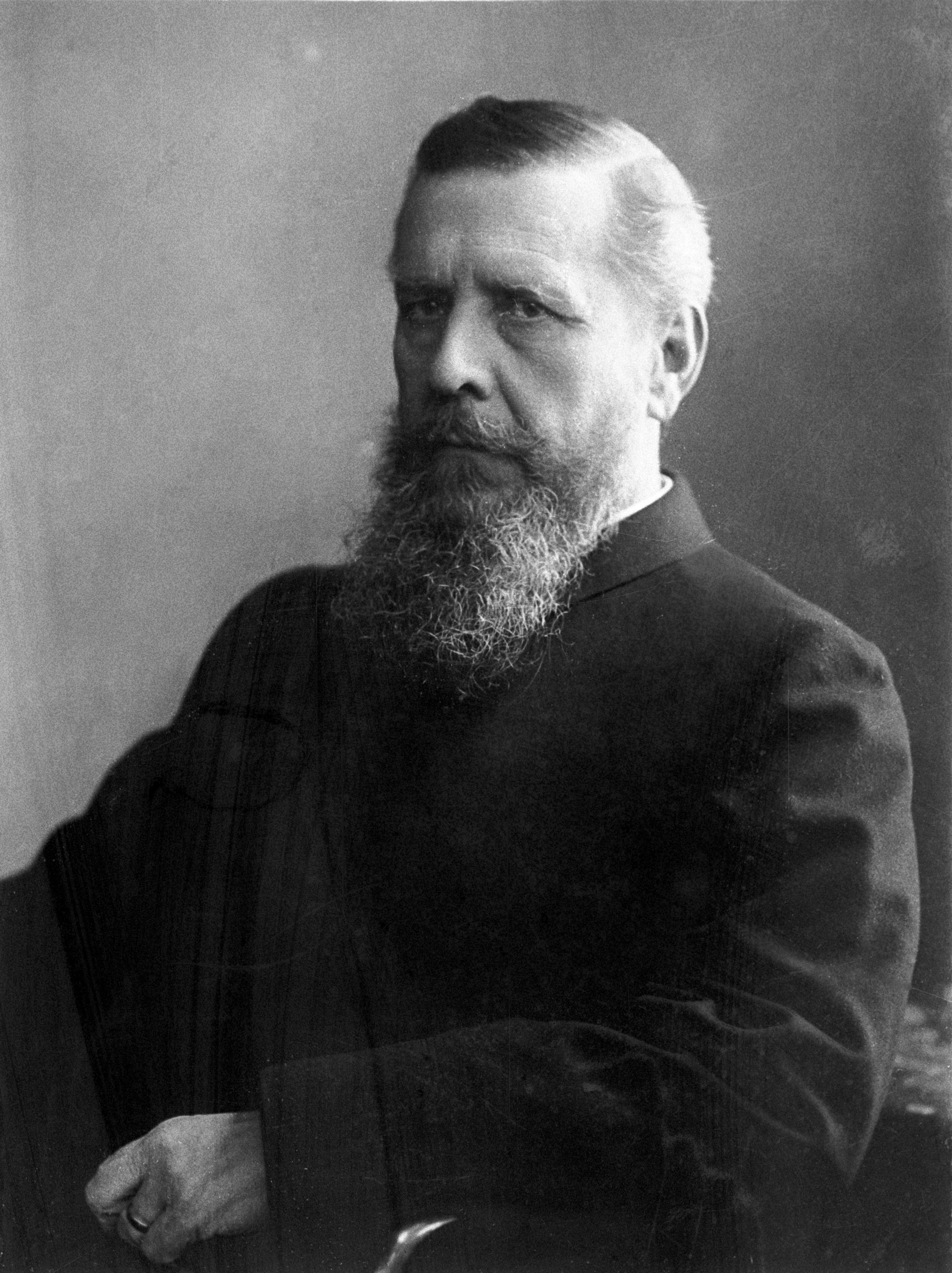
Image of Robert Vischer

Robert Vischer (22 February 1847, Tübingen – 25 March 1933, Vienna) was a German philosopher who invented the term Einfühlung (esthetic sympathy, later translated in English as empathy), which was to be promoted by Theodor Lipps, Freud's admired philosopher.

== Vischer’s use of Einfühlung ==
Vischer postulated the as yet undescribed distinction between Verstehen and Einfühlung (“empathy”) in his 1873 doctoral thesis On the Optical Sense of Form: A Contribution to Aesthetics. It was the first mention of the word Einfühlung in this form in print. His more-famous father, Friedrich Theodor Vischer, had used the term Einfühlen in explorations of idealism relative to architectural form, and related concepts were certainly already in the air. Indeed, the phrase "sich einfühlen" was used by Herder in the 18th century. Nonetheless, Robert Vischer's exploration was the first significant discussion of the concept of Einfühlung under that precise name.
