= Alice von Hildebrand =

Belgian-American Catholic philosopher (1923–2022)

Alice von Hildebrand GCSG
- Born: Alice Marie Jourdain; 11 March 1923; Brussels, Belgium
- Died: 14 January 2022 (aged 98); New Rochelle, New York, U.S.
- Education: Manhattanville College; Fordham University
- Occupations: Philosopher, theologian, professor, author
- Employer: Hunter College
- Spouse: Dietrich von Hildebrand (m. 1959; died 1977)

Alice Marie von Hildebrand, GCSG (née Jourdain; 11 March 1923 – 14 January 2022) was a Belgian-born American Catholic philosopher, theologian, author, and professor. She taught philosophy at Hunter College for 37 years. She was also the second wife of Dietrich von Hildebrand.

== Early life ==
Von Hildebrand was born Alice Marie Jourdain to Henri and Marthe (van der Horst) Jourdain in Brussels, Belgium, on 11 March 1923. Her first language was French. She left her home country in 1940, shortly after it was invaded by Germany, and relocated to the United States as a refugee. She initially attended Manhattanville College, before studying philosophy at Fordham University, where she obtained a doctorate in 1949.

== Career ==
Von Hildebrand struggled to find employment in academia. She was rejected by Catholic colleges, who informed her that they did not employ women to teach philosophy. She eventually started teaching at Hunter College – a constituent college of the City University of New York – in 1947. After she married Dietrich von Hildebrand in 1959, she continued to publish and teach under her maiden name, as her academic career predated her marriage and because association with her husband’s highly controversial public profile could complicate her professional standing. She only received academic tenure after 14 years of teaching. Despite being advised by the college president (and fellow Catholic) George N. Shuster that she would be more content teaching at a Catholic institution, she was of the opinion that it was essential for a Catholic to be present at a secular educational institution. She ultimately remained at Hunter College for 37 years. She attributed the conversion of many of her students to Catholicism to her teaching of objective truth.

Von Hildebrand retired early in 1984, having grown weary of being issued a teaching schedule that concluded at 10 pm. She was subsequently conferred the Presidential Award for excellence in teaching by the college. Von Hildebrand made more than 80 appearances on EWTN television programming. She launched the Dietrich von Hildebrand Legacy Project in 2004 with some of her husband's former students. Her works include The Soul of a Lion: The Life of Dietrich von Hildebrand (2000), a biography of her husband, and her autobiography, Memoirs of a Happy Failure (2014), which recounts her escape from Nazi Europe and her teaching career at Hunter College.

== Views ==
Von Hildebrand criticized what she considered to be the advance of relativism and modernism in the Catholic Church, particularly within its institutions of Catholic higher education and its Catholic schools. Hildebrand held conservative Catholic views on homosexuality, saying that it "constitutes a grave offense to God and brings great moral harm to the persons engaging in it", and arguing that those with "homosexual tendencies" should practice celibacy. She was also an outspoken critic of feminism.

== Personal life ==
Von Hildebrand married Catholic philosopher and theologian Dietrich von Hildebrand in 1959, two years after his first wife died. They first met at Fordham University, where she was a student and he was a professor. She later worked as his secretary and collaborated with him on authoring books, such as The Art of Living. They did not have children together, and remained married until his death in 1977.

Von Hildebrand was made a Dame of Grand Cross of the Order of Saint Gregory the Great, a papal order of knighthood, in October 2013. She died on 14 January 2022 at her home in New Rochelle, New York. She was 98, and suffered a brief illness prior to her death.

== Bibliography ==
- Greek Culture, the Adventure of the Human Spirit, editor (G. Braziller, 1966) ISBN 978-0-8076-0366-6
- Introduction to a Philosophy of Religion (Franciscan Herald Press, 1970)
- By Love Refined: Letters to a Young Bride (Sophia Institute Press, 1989) ISBN 978-1-62282-889-0
- Women and the Priesthood (Franciscan University Press, 1994) ISBN 978-0-940535-72-5
- By Grief Refined: Letters to a Widow (Franciscan University Press, 1994) ISBN 978-0-940535-75-6
- Memoiren und Aufsätze gegen den Nationalsozialismus, 1933–1938, with Dietrich von Hildebrand and Rudolf Ebneth, (Matthias-Grünewald-Verlag, 1994) ISBN 978-3-7867-1737-9
- Soul of a Lion: Dietrich Von Hildebrand; A Biography (Ignatius Press, 2000) ISBN 978-0-89870-801-1
- The Privilege of Being a Woman (Veritas Press, 2002) ISBN 978-0-9706106-7-6
- Man and Woman: A Divine Invention (Ignatius Press, 2010) ISBN 978-1-932589-56-6
- Memoirs of a Happy Failure, with John Henry Crosby (Saint Benedict Press, 2014) ISBN 978-1-618901-26-2
