= Hans Lipps =

German philosopher (1889–1941)

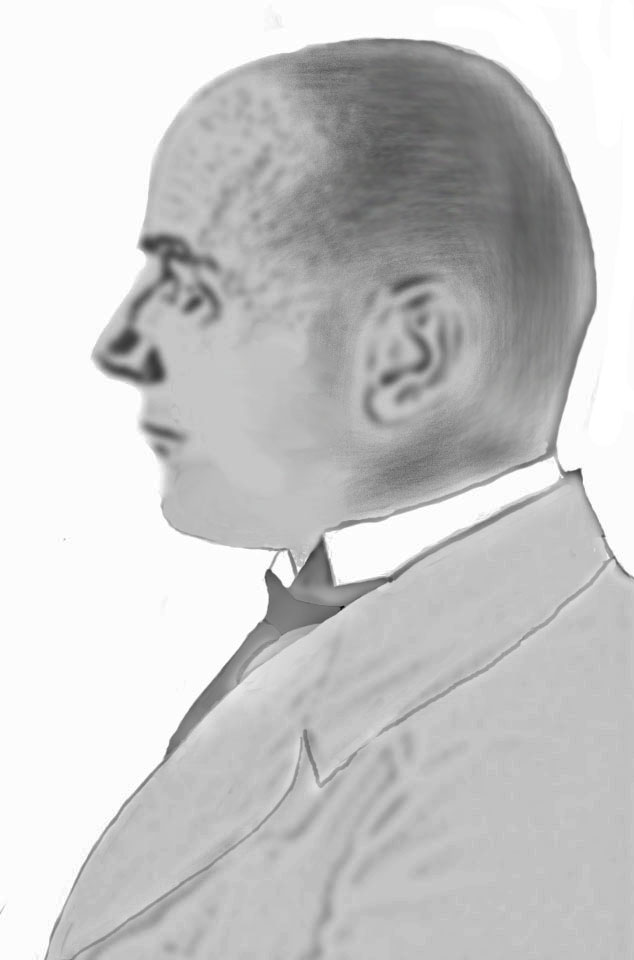
- Born: 22 November 1889; Pirma, German Empire
- Died: 10 September 1941 (aged 51); Dudino, Russian SFSR, Soviet Union

Philosophical work
- Era: 20th-century philosophy
- Region: Western philosophy
- School: Continental philosophy
- Main interests: Phenomenology, existentialism

Hans Lipps (22 November 1889 – 10 September 1941) was a German phenomenological and existentialist philosopher.

== Biographical sketch ==
Following his highschool graduation in Dresden in 1909, Lipps began studying art history, architecture, aesthetics and philosophy at the Ludwig-Maximilians-Universität München. In 1910 and 1911, while doing his military service in Dresden, he continued his philosophical studies at TU Dresden. In spring 1911, he moved to the University of Göttingen to study with Edmund Husserl. Together with Theodor Conrad and his wife, Hedwig Conrad-Martius, as well as Roman Ingarden and Fritz Kaufmann, Lipps belonged to the famous "Philosophical Society of Göttingen" that gathered around Husserl and Adolf Reinach. This society also included Edith Stein, who described the young Lipps as follows: "He was very tall, slender but strong; his handsome, expressive face was fresh like a child's and his big round eyes were earnest – questioning like a child's eyes. He usually uttered his opinion in a short but definitive statement".

Lipps also studied biology. In the winter of 1912, he completed a doctorate with a dissertation entitled "About structural changes of plants in a modified medium", after which he began to study medicine. Between 1914 and 1918, he served in World War I as an assistant army physician. After the war, he continued his interrupted studies at the University of Göttingen and the University of Freiburg and completed his formal medical degree. In 1919, he received his license to practice medicine, and in 1920, he published a Ph.D. dissertation in medicine addressing "... the effect of certain colchicine derivatives".

In 1921, he completed his habilitation (qualification for professorship) under the mathematician Richard Courant, whom he had met through Edith Stein, with a dissertation entitled "Investigations into the philosophy of mathematics". Lipps had close personal links with the philosophers Josef König, Helmuth Plessner, and Georg Misch. During the academic year 1923/24 he and Misch conducted a seminar on the theory of signification (hermeneutics). In 1928, Lipps substituted for the professor of philosophy at Marburg University. Having declined a professorship at the University of Santiago de Chile, he accepted in 1936 the position of Ordinarius (chair professor) of philosophy at Goethe University Frankfurt.

Throughout his academic career, Lipps continued occasionally to practice medicine, substituting alternatively for army physicians and country doctors. During the term breaks 1921/1922 and again 1930/1931, when he was already teaching as a professor, he served for extensive periods as a doctor in the navy, traveling to all continents except for Australia. In 1934, Hans Lipps joined the SS. According to Otto Friedrich Bollnow, Lipps did so to put a distance between himself and the NSDAP, submitting that SS was a purely military organisation.

In September 1939, at the beginning of World War II, he was drafted to the military and served as an army doctor in France and Russia. He lost his life in a battle at Shabero/Ochwat on 10 September 1941 and was buried in the nearby cemetery of Dudino.

== Works ==
Hans Lipps: Werke in five volumes. Frankfurt a. Main: Vittorio Klostermann Verlag, 1976-1977.

- Volume I: Untersuchungen zur Phänomenologie der Erkenntnis. Part 1: "Das Ding und seine Eigenschaften " (1927); Part 2: "Aussage und Urteil " (1928). ISBN 978-3-465-01137-8
- Volume II: Untersuchungen zu einer hermeneutischen Logik (1938). ISBN 978-3-465-01147-7
- Volume III: Die menschliche Natur (1941). ISBN 978-3-465-01221-4
- Volume IV: Die Verbindlichkeit der Sprache. "Aufsätze und Vorträge" (1929 bis 1941), "Frühe Schriften" (1921 bis 1927), "Bemerkungen." ISBN 978-3-465-01222-1
- Volume V: Die Wirklichkeit des Menschen. "Aufsätze und Vorträge" (1932 bis 1939), "Frühe Schriften" (1921 und 1924), "Fragmentarisches." ISBN 978-3-465-01223-8

Hans Georg Gadamer writes in the preface to the edition of Lipps's works: "In our days, Lipps's work should once again find its time. Mining in the quarry of language undertaken in England in the wake of Wittgenstein, Austin, and Searle has not only a predecessor, but an excellent counterpart in Hans Lipps. In questioning language, Lipps gains almost inexhaustible answers. Among phenomenologists, Lipps's standing in unrivaled in his aural sensitivity for language and this perception of gesture."

== Sources and further reading ==
- Otto Friedrich Bollnow, Studien zur Hermeneutik. Volume II: "Zur hermeneutischen Logik von Georg Misch und Hans Lipps." Freiburg / München: Alber, 1983. ISBN 3-495-47513-3
- Otto Friedrich Bollnow, Hans Lipps: "Ein Beitrag zur philosophischen Lage der Gegenwart," in Blätter für Deutsche Philosophie.16 (1941/3), p. 293-323 [1]
- Gottfried Bräuer: Wege in die Sprache. Ludwig Wittgenstein und Hans Lipps, in: Bildung und Erziehung 1963, pp. 131–140.
- Alfred W. E. Hübner, Existenz und Sprache. Überlegungen zur hermeneutischen Sprachauffassung von Martin Heidegger und Hans Lipps. Berlin: Duncker und Humblot, 2001. ISBN 3-428-10286-X
- Frithjof Rodi "Beiträge zum 100. Geburtstag von Hans Lipps am 22. November 1989: 4 Beiträge zur Biographie, 4 Beiträge zur Philosophie von Hans Lipps, Texte und Dokumente," in Dilthey-Jahrbuch für Philosophie und Geschichte der Geisteswissenschaften 6 (1989), ed. together with O. F. Bollnow, U. Dierse, K. Gründer, R. Makkreel, O. Pöggeler and H.-M- Sass. Göttingen: Vandenhoek & Ruprecht, 1989.
- Guy van Kerckhoven / Hans Lipps: Fragilität der Existenz. Phänomenologische Studien zur Natur des Menschen. Verlag Karl Alber, Freiburg / München 2011. ISBN 978-3-495-48494-4
- Gerhard Rogler, Die hermeneutische Logik von Hans Lipps und die Begründbarkeit wissenschaftlicher Erkenntnis. Würzburg: Ergon, 1998. ISBN 3-932004-74-4
- Wolfgang von der Weppen, Die existentielle Situation und die Rede. Untersuchungen zu Logik und Sprache in der existentiellen Hermeneutik von Hans Lipps. Würzburg: Königshausen und Neumann, 1984. ISBN 3-88479-160-5
- Meinolf Wewel, Die Konstitution des transzendenten Etwas im Vollzug des Sehens. Eine Untersuchung im Anschluß an die Philosophie von Hans Lipps und in Auseinandersetzung mit Edmund Husserls Lehre vom "intentionalen Bewußtseinskorrelat." Düsseldorf 1968. ISBN 3-495-47528-1 - Google
