= Ronda Chervin =

American Catholic author and philosophy professor (born 1937

Ronda Chervin (born 1937, New York City) is an American Catholic author, international speaker and philosophy professor. She is the author of over 80 books concerning the matters of Catholic thought, practice and spirituality, including Taming the Lion Within: 5 Steps From Anger to Peace, Last Call: Fourteen Men Who Dared Answer, and her autobiography, En Route to Eternity. A widow, mother, grandmother, and great-grandmother, she is originally from New York.

Coming from a Jewish — though atheistic — background, Chervin converted to the Catholic faith when she was a young adult. She graduated from Fordham University with a Ph.D. in Philosophy and earned an MA in Religious Studies from Notre Dame Apostolic Institute. While at Fordham, Chervin studied under Dietrich von Hildebrand. Since then, as a professor of philosophy, she has taught at numerous colleges, including Loyola Marymount University, the Seminary of the Archdiocese of Los Angeles, the Franciscan University of Steubenville, and Holy Apostles College and Seminary in Cromwell, CT. She frequently presents on Catholic TV and Radio.
