= Aloys Fischer =

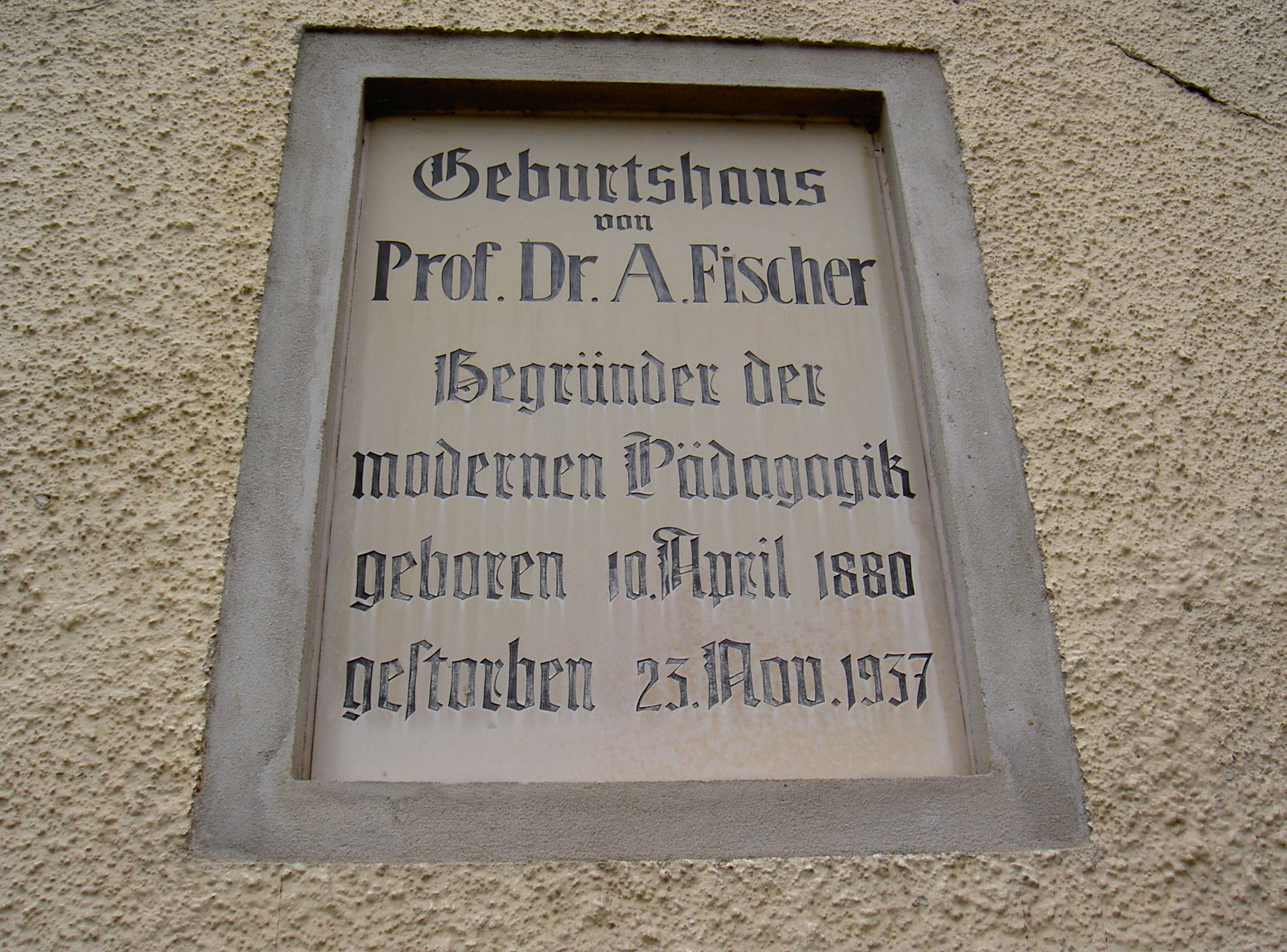
Plaque commemorating the birth of Alois Fischer, 10 April 1880

Aloys Fischer (German: [ˈfɪʃɐ]; 10 April 1880 – 23 November 1937) was a German educationalist who worked on the foundations of a modern theory of education.

== Life ==
Fischer was born in Furth im Wald, Kingdom of Bavaria, on 10 April 1880. He attended the local elementary school. In 1891, he was awarded a scholarship to the grammar school based at the Benedictine Metten Abbey. He finished there in 1899 and then attended the Ludwig-Maximilians-Universität München (LMU) in Munich studying Classical Philology, German, and history. After passing the First State Exam in 1902, he studied for a doctorate under Theodor Lipps. From 1903 to 1906, Fischer tutored the children of Adolf von Hildebrand. His dissertation On symbolic Relations, was rewarded with a prize from the Faculty of Arts.

In 1906, he married Paula Thalmann, with whom he had two sons, Ernst Maria (born 1907) and Peter Paul (born 1911).

He was appointed as a private lecturer in philosophy by Prince Regent Luitpold of Bavaria. From 1910, Fischer was simultaneously scientific director of the Pedagogical-Psychological Institute of the Munich Teachers' Association, and from 1914 additionally one of the editors of the series Pädagogische Monographien. In 1915, he became associate professor of philosophy at the LMU and in 1918 full professor of pedagogy. In 1920, he succeeded Friedrich Wilhelm Foerster and became director of the university's Pedagogical Seminar. Together with Otto Scheibner, Georg Kerschensteiner, Ludwig Pallat, and Richard Seyfert, he edited the journal Die Arbeitsschule from 1924. From 1925, he was also one of the editors of the journal Die Erziehung, along with Theodor Litt, Herman Nohl, Eduard Spranger, and Wilhelm Flitner.

In the winter semester of 1927/28, he became Dean of the Faculty of Philosophy, and in 1929, together with Alexander Pfänder, Chairman of the Psychological Seminar at the Ludwig-Maximilians-Universität München. In the same year, he participated in a survey of Bavarian universities aimed at integrating teacher training into university studies. In 1935, Fischer was both First Director of the Psychological Seminar and Director of the Pedagogical Seminar.

Due to his wife being Jewish, he emigrated in 1937. In the same year, he died in Munich after an operation.

== Legacy ==
Fischer's work focused on the development of vocational education and vocational schools. Structures of today's technical and vocational high schools go back to his plans and considerations.
