= John F. Crosby (philosopher) =

American philosopher

- Born: November 5, 1944 (age 81); Washington, D.C.
- Spouse: Pia Wenisch
- Children: 6 including John Henry Crosby
- Awards: Phi Beta Kappa

Education
- Education: University of Salzburg (PhD), Georgetown University (BA)
- Thesis: Zur Kritik der marxistischen Anthropologie (Critique of the Marxist Philosophy of Man)

Philosophical work
- Era: 21st-century philosophy
- Region: Western philosophy
- Institutions: Franciscan University of Steubenville, University of Dallas

John F. Crosby (born November 5, 1944) is an American philosopher and Professor Emeritus of Philosophy at Franciscan University of Steubenville, known for his work on John Henry Newman, Max Scheler, Karol Wojtyła, and Dietrich von Hildebrand.

== Books ==
- The Selfhood of the Human Person, Catholic University of America Press 1996
- Personalist Papers, Catholic University of America Press 2004
- The Personalism of John Henry Newman, Catholic University of America Press 2014
