= Dietrich von Hildebrand =

German Catholic philosopher (1889–1977)

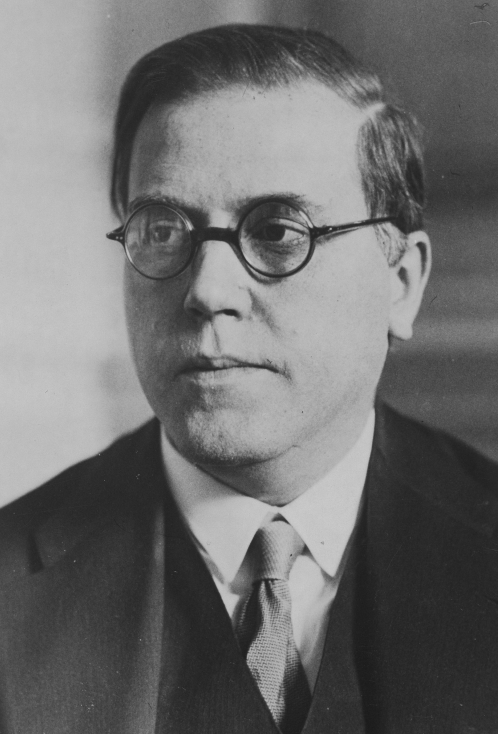
- Photograph by Max Fenichel
- Born: Dietrich Richard Alfred von Hildebrand; 12 October 1889; Florence, Kingdom of Italy
- Died: 26 January 1977 (aged 87); New Rochelle, New York, US
- Spouses: Margarete Denck (m. 1912; died 1957) Alice M. Jourdain (m. 1959)
- Children: 1

Education
- Education: Ludwig-Maximilians-Universität München; University of Göttingen
- Doctoral advisor: Edmund Husserl
- Other advisors: Theodor Lipps; Adolf Reinach; Max Scheler

Philosophical work
- Era: Contemporary philosophy
- Region: Western philosophy
- School: Continental philosophy; Phenomenology; Munich phenomenology; Personalism
- Institutions: Fordham University
- Main interests: Axiology; Christianity; Ethics; Metaphysics; Philosophy of religion; Aesthetics
- Notable ideas: Human and divine affectivity

Dietrich Richard Alfred von Hildebrand (German: [ˈhɪldəbʁant]; 12 October 1889 – 26 January 1977) was a German Catholic philosopher and religious writer.

Hildebrand was called "the twentieth-century Doctor of the Church" by Pope Pius XII. He was a leading philosopher in the realist phenomenological and personalist movements, producing works in every major field of philosophy, including ethics, metaphysics, epistemology, philosophical anthropology, social philosophy, and aesthetics. Pope John Paul II greatly admired the philosophical work of Hildebrand, remarking once to his widow, Alice von Hildebrand, "Your husband is one of the great ethicists of the twentieth century." Pope Benedict XVI also had a particular admiration and regard for Hildebrand, who knew Ratzinger as a young priest in Munich: "When the intellectual history of the Catholic Church in the twentieth century is written, the name of Dietrich von Hildebrand will be most prominent among the figures of our time."

Hildebrand is known for his consistent, public opposition to Nazism before and during World War II.

== Biography ==
Born and raised in Florence, in the Kingdom of Italy, Hildebrand grew up in a German secular household, the son of sculptor Adolf von Hildebrand (grandson of economist Bruno Hildebrand and Therese Guttentag) and Irene Schäuffelen, who lived in a former Minim friary. He received his early education from private tutors. Although raised in a home without religion, Hildebrand developed a deep sense for beauty, value, and the sacred from an early age.

Sent to Munich at the age of fifteen for his Abitur, Hildebrand enrolled at the Ludwig-Maximilians-Universität München two years later, where he joined a circle of students who first followed the philosopher Theodor Lipps but soon were swayed by the teachings of Edmund Husserl. Through this circle he came to know Max Scheler, through whose influence (and through his depiction of St. Francis of Assisi) Hildebrand converted to Catholicism in 1914. In 1909 he attended the University of Göttingen, where he completed his doctorate in philosophy under Husserl and Adolf Reinach, whom he later credited with helping to shape his own philosophical views.

In 1912, he married Margarete Denck, and with her had one child, Franz. His grandson is environmental leader Martin von Hildebrand.

In 1914, he and his wife were received into the Catholic Church. Upon the outbreak of the First World War Hildebrand was drafted into service as a physician's assistant in Munich, serving as a kind of surgical nurse.

Hildebrand published his first book, The Nature of Moral Action (Die Idee der Sittlichen Handlung), in 1916, and two years later, after the war had ended, was given a teaching position at the Ludwig-Maximilians-Universität München, eventually gaining an assistant professorship there in 1924. By then he had published another work, Morality and the Knowledge of Moral Values (Sittlichkeit und Ethische Werterkenntniss) (1921).

Hildebrand was a vocal critic of National Socialism, which he saw as anti-Christian and contrary to true philosophical views, as early as 1921. During the Putsch of 1923, Hildebrand was forced to flee Munich briefly for his safety. When Hitler came to power in 1933, Hildebrand fled Germany, going first to Italy, and then to Vienna. There, with the support of the Austrian Chancellor Engelbert Dollfuss, he founded and edited an anti-Nazi weekly paper, Der Christliche Ständestaat ("The Christian Corporative State").

Hildebrand was once again forced to flee when Hitler annexed Austria in 1938; after the members of the Austrian government, Hildebrand was the person most wanted by the Gestapo. He spent eleven months in Switzerland, near Fribourg. He then moved to Fiac in France, near Toulouse, where he taught at the Catholic University of Toulouse. When the Nazis invaded France in 1940 he went into hiding; after many hardships, and the heroic assistance of Frenchmen, including Edmond Michelet and the American journalist Varian Fry, he was able to escape to Portugal with his wife, their son Franz, and their daughter-in-law. From there they travelled by ship to Brazil and then on to New York City, arriving in 1940. There he taught philosophy at the Jesuit Fordham University on Rose Hill in the Bronx where he then mentored the Catholic author and philosophy professor Ronda Chervin and the philosopher William Marra, to whom he dedicated his work What is Philosophy?.

In 1957 his wife of forty-five years died, and in 1959 he married Alice M. Jourdain, also a philosopher and theologian who was a student of his at Fordham University.

Hildebrand retired from teaching in 1960, spending the remaining years of his life writing dozens of books in both German and English. He was a vocal critic of many of the ways in which the Second Vatican Council was implemented, especially the Mass of Paul VI in the vernacular. Because of this, he helped to promote appreciation of and attendance at the Tridentine Mass in Ecclesiastical Latin. He was a founder of Una Voce America and vice director of Luigi Villa's Chiesa viva ("Living Church"). But his personalist work—for example, on the freedom of persons and on the unitive end of sexual intercourse—also helped prepare for many aspects of the Second Vatican Council's teachings, and Hildebrand always advocated reading the council's texts in continuity with the Catholic Church's tradition.

Hildebrand died in New Rochelle, New York in 1977, after prolonged illness from heart disease.

== Career ==
Von Hildebrand's academic career spanned several decades, during which he held positions at various institutions, including the Ludwig-Maximilians-Universität München, Fordham University, and the Jesuit Gregorian University in Rome. He was a prolific author, with over 30 books to his name, covering a range of topics including ethics, aesthetics, philosophy, and theology. Von Hildebrand was particularly known for his opposition to Nazi ideology, and he emigrated from Germany in 1933 after being banned from teaching of publishing his writings under censorship in Nazi Germany.

== Key philosophical ideas ==
=== Realist phenomenology ===
Like Reinach, Scheler, Roman Ingarden, and many Munich phenomenologists, Hildebrand reacted against Edmund Husserl's transcendental idealist turn in phenomenology, on which the meaning of all objects is constituted by conscious subjects. Rather, Hildebrand endorsed a realist version of phenomenology. On this phenomenological method, we set out to focus attention on explanatory, causal, or abstract theories regarding the things we experience, so as to attain "existential contact with reality" and a "living plenitude and full flavor of being" and to do "justice to the qualitative nature of the object." The goal of this method is a direct, intuitive perception of real beings. Hildebrand focuses especially on experiences of essences, that is, of necessary unities of content, like what it is to be a triangle or what it is to be justice. But he also uses this method to show how we can directly analyze all sorts of real phenomena, including human persons, organisms, artworks, and communities. Unlike in Husserl's idealist phenomenology, Hildebrand's philosophical psychology focuses on how real beings appear as intrinsically meaningful, and as giving their content to our perceptual acts, rather than our acts bestowing meaning upon them.

Rather than seeing knowledge primarily in terms of its utility, Hildebrand emphasizes how we as knowing subjects can be fulfilled by a contemplative, perceptual union with various beings. Contemplation, which is intrinsically enjoyable and done for its own sake, can occur in relation to beautiful artworks and natural beings, friends and loved ones, essential and necessary truths, and God. Human persons not only experience themselves subjectively, and experience certain phenomena as subjective in the sense of being important for their lives, but human persons can also transcend themselves, going beyond their own subjectivity to make contact with what is other than them, and concerning themselves with others for their own sake.

=== Categories of motivation ===
Hildebrand focused on ethics more than on any other branch of philosophy. Throughout his ethical works, Hildebrand distinguishes three ways in which human choices and actions are motivated:

1. We can be motivated by the subjectively satisfying, that is, by what is pleasing to us as individuals, without consideration of what objectively fulfills our nature or is important in itself.
2. We can be motivated by the objective good for persons, that is, by what objectively fulfills the needs, abilities, appetites, and desires that we have insofar as we have human nature.
3. We can be motivated by values or what is important in itself, that is, by what calls for a certain response as due to it, without reference to our own fulfillment or satisfaction.

In many of his works, Hildebrand focuses on distinguishing kinds of values and describing the intellectual, volitional, or affective response that is due to it. Values must be grasped by direct perception, and so realist phenomenology is an excellent method for describing exactly how values appear. Hildebrand frequently engages in this description by distinguishing experiences in which a certain value appears from experiences in which other values or other phenomena appear. For example, in Graven Images, he carefully describes the difference between experiences of genuine moral values from experiences of similar, but non-moral values, like honor.

Kinds of values that he distinguishes include: moral values (like justice or generosity), intellectual values (like the importance of genius and creativity), ontological values (the value a thing has in virtue of the kind of thing it is), aesthetic values (like beauty and elegance), and many other sorts of value. Each value gives its bearer importance in itself, which categorically calls for a response of a kind appropriate to the value in question. Values present themselves as real properties, and as having their own ideal, necessary structure.

Throughout his works, Hildebrand describes many ways in which values impact our lives. For example, in In Defense of Purity, he describes how awareness of values in the sexual sphere can lead to the virtue of purity and to having chaste reverence for other persons' bodies. In The Nature of Love, he describes how different values and different sorts of motivation give rise to different kinds of love; there, he also describes how we can be motivated by different kinds of values at the same time—for example, in falling in love with another person, I simultaneously see both the value of that other and that other as an objective good for me. In Metaphysics of Community, he describes how different sorts of values unify different kinds of communities, like families, nations, and the Church.

=== Sacred Heart of Jesus ===
In addition to the traditionally-distinguished intellect and will, Hildebrand argues in The Heart that some feelings or affective acts are properly personal acts. A personal or spiritual act is one that is not just caused in us, but is motivated by intentional awareness of its object. While Hildebrand grants that many feelings are purely bodily acts, which are caused by physiological or other physical events, he also argues that many feelings are intentional (that is, object-directed) acts. These include feelings of love, reverence, gratitude, disgust, hatred, and pride. Many such affective acts are responses to values; some values call for feelings as their proper response. It is a sign that some feelings are properly speaking personal or spiritual that they are meaningful, motivated responses to values. A person is not fully virtuous until he or she gives valuable goods their proper affective response; to merely perform morally right acts or hold true beliefs is not sufficient for full virtue, or for giving objects and persons all that is due to them. Feelings must be received as a gift, and cannot be forced by our own volitions, but we can encourage the right feelings to arise by voluntarily sanctioning them and by voluntarily disavowing undue feelings. As in his discussion of values, Hildebrand writes a lot about distinguishing kinds of feelings, and about analyzing their place in the moral life, as well as in the Christian life—something he emphasizes by a careful analysis of the Sacred Heart of Jesus.

=== Transformation in Christ ===
Transformation in Christ is a book written by Dietrich von Hildebrand that explores the idea of spiritual transformation and the journey toward holiness in the Christian life. The book consists of 35 chapters, each of which focuses on a different aspect of the Christian life and the process of transformation.

Von Hildebrand argues that the goal of the Christian life is not simply to follow a set of rules or to achieve a certain level of moral perfection, but rather to be transformed from within and to develop a deep personal relationship with God. He stresses the importance of cultivating virtues such as humility, faith, hope, and love, and of seeking to overcome the obstacles that stand in the way of our spiritual growth.

Throughout the book, von Hildebrand draws on the teachings of the Bible, the writings of the saints, and his own personal experiences to offer insights into the spiritual life. He emphasizes the need for prayer, meditation, and self-examination, and he encourages readers to seek out the guidance of spiritual directors and to participate in the sacraments of the Church.

== Bibliography ==
- Hildebrand, Dietrich von (1918). Sittlichkeit und Ethische Werterkenntnis (Doctoral thesis).

=== Books ===
- Marriage: The Mystery of Faithful Love (1929)
- Metaphysics of Community (1930, Hildebrand Project, 2022)
- In Defense of Purity: An Analysis of the Catholic Ideals of Purity and Virginity (Longmans, Green and Co., 1931, Hildebrand Project, 2018 ISBN 9781939773036)
- Actual Questions in the Light of Eternity (1931)
- The Essence of Philosophical Research and Knowledge (1934)
- Liturgy and Personality (Longmans, 1943, Hildebrand Project, 2017 ISBN 9781939773005)
- Transformation in Christ (Longmans, 1948, Ignatius Press, 2011 ISBN 9780898708691)
- Fundamental Moral Attitudes (Longmans, 1950)
- Christian Ethics (McKay, 1952; Hildebrand Press, 2020) (Note: The 2020 edition is titled Ethics.)
- The New Tower of Babel (P. J. Kenedy, 1953)
- True Morality and Its Counterfeits, with Alice M. Jourdain (McKay, 1955)
- Graven Images: Substitutes for True Morality, with Alice M. Jourdain (McKay, 1957; Hildebrand Press, 2019)
- Mozart, Beethoven, Schubert (J. Habbel, 1961; Hildebrand Project, 2025; ISBN 9781939773234)
- Not as the World Gives: St. Francis' Message to Laymen Today (Franciscan Herald Press, 1963)
- The Art of Living, with Alice von Hildebrand (Franciscan Herald Press, 1965; Hildebrand Press, 2017 ISBN 9781939773098)
- Man and Woman: Love and the Meaning of Intimacy, (Franciscan Herald Press, 1966; Sophia Institute Press, 1996 ISBN 9780918477149)
- Morality and Situation Ethics, (Franciscan Herald Press, 1966; Hildebrand Press, 2019 ISBN 9781939773111)
- Love, Marriage, and the Catholic Conscience: Understanding the Church's Teachings on Birth Control (Sophia Institute Press, 1998)
- The Trojan Horse in the City of God: The Catholic Crisis Explained (Chicago: Franciscan Herald Press, 1967)
- The Encyclical Humanae vitae, a sign of Contradiction: An Essay on Birth Control and Catholic Conscience, (Franciscan Herald Press, 1969, Hildebrand Project, 2018, 2021 ISBN 9781939773135)
- Celibacy and the Crisis of Faith, (Franciscan Herald Press, 1971)
- Ethics (Franciscan Herald Press, 1972)
- What is Philosophy? (Franciscan Herald Press, 1973; Routledge, 1991; Hildebrand Press, 2021 ISBN 9781939773173)
- The Devastated Vineyard (Chicago: Franciscan Herald Press, 1973)
- Jaws of Death: Gate of Heaven (1976, Hildebrand Project, 2020)
- The Heart: an Analysis of Human and Divine Affectivity, (Franciscan Herald Press, 1977; St. Augustine's Press, 2012)
- Making Christ's Peace a Part of Your Life (Sophia Institute Press, 1998)
- Humility: Wellspring of Virtue (Sophia Institute Press, 2017) ISBN 9780918477590
- The Nature of Love (St. Augustine's Press, 2010)
- My Battle with Hitler: Defiance in the Shadow of the Third Reich (Image, 2014) ISBN 9780385347532
- Aesthetics
  - Volume I (Hildebrand Press, 2016) ISBN 9781939773043
  - Volume II (Hildebrand Press, 2018) ISBN 9781939773104
- Beauty in the Light of the Redemption (Hildebrand Project, 2019) ISBN 9781939773050
- The Dethronement of Truth (Hildebrand Project, 2021) ISBN 9781939773180
- The Roots of Moral Evil (Hildebrand Project, 2024) ISBN 9781939773210

== Sources ==
- Alice von Hildebrand, The Soul of a Lion, a biography (Ignatius Press, 2000, ISBN 0-89870-801-X)
- Dietrich von Hildebrand, My Battle Against Hitler, translated and edited by John Henry and John F. Crosby (Image Books, 2014, ISBN 978-0385347518)
- Von Hildebrand, D. (1990). Transformation in Christ. Sophia Institute Press. ISBN 0898708699
