= William A. Marra =

American politician

William A. Marra (February 20, 1928 – December 12, 1998) was a third-party Right to Life Party candidate for President of the United States in the 1988 presidential election; his running mate was Joan Andrews. They received 20,504 votes. Marra had also been a candidate in the Republican and Democratic parties' United States presidential primary in New Hampshire. In the former he received six write-in votes and in the latter received 142 votes.

== Biography ==
William A. Marra was born in Jersey City, New Jersey, on February 20, 1928 of Italian immigrant parents. He grew up in Jersey City, but attended the Jesuit Regis High School in New York City.

He was a graduate of the University of Detroit Mercy School of Engineering and Fordham University, serving as a professor of philosophy at the latter for nearly four decades. Marra was an active lecturer, opposing topics such as abortion, atheism and sex education.

For 17 years, Marra hosted a radio program called "Where Catholics Meet" on 710 WOR-AM in New York City. On the show, he addressed issues facing orthodox Catholics in the post-Vatican II world. He often had guests. In the early 1990s, Marra hosted a TV program on the EWTN Global Catholic Network called "The Roman Forum." This program ran for two seasons and addressed many of the same issues as "Where Catholics Meet", but involved fewer guest hosts.

Marra founded Catholic Media Apostolate, an organization dedicated to the propagation of the Roman Catholic faith through the media. He was also heavily involved in Keep the Faith, an organization similar to CMA.

In 2003, his daughter Lorretta Marra Malvasi was convicted of assisting James Charles Kopp subsequent to Kopp's killing of Barnett Slepian, a physician who legally performed abortions in New York State.

== Bibliography ==
- von Hildebrand, Dietrich (1973). Satan at Work: in Biblical exegesis...in Catechetics & Religious Education...in Desacralized Worship...in Ostpolitik (foreword)
- Marra, William A. (1979) Happiness and Christian Hope: A Phenomenological Analysis ISBN 0-8199-0770-7
- Marra, William A. (with Dietrich von Hildebrand). Sex Education: The Basic Issues
- Marra, William A. “Von Hildebrand on Love, Happiness, and Sex.” In The Catholic Writer: The Proceedings of the Wethersfield Institute 2 (Ignatius Press, 1989): 119-127.
