= Otto Selz =

German psychologist

Otto Selz

Otto Selz (14 February 1881 – 27 August 1943) was a German psychologist, born in Munich, Bavaria. He formulated the first non-associationist theory of thinking, in 1913. Influenced by the German phenomenological tradition, Selz used the method of introspection, but unlike his predecessors, his theory developed without the use of images and associations. Wilhelm Wundt used the method of introspection in the 1880s, but thought that higher-level mental processes could not be studied in the scientific laboratory.

== Work ==
Selz's ideas anticipated some major concepts in modern cognitive psychology, including the following:

- Associationism and the idea that problem-solving is goal-directed.
- Anticipatory Schemas - Understanding a problem involves forming a structure within the mind.
- Reproductive and productive thinking - Solving problems with known methods and creating new methods when old ones don't work.
- Solving a problem involves testing for conditions.

Selz was an associate professor of legal philosophy at the University of Bonn, 1921–1923. From 1923 to 1933, Selz was a full professor of philosophy, psychology, and pedagogy of the Mannheim Business School. He also served as the Rector of the Graduate School of Mannheim, 1929–1930. Selz's career was shortened by Nazi policies in Europe, which banned him from his profession in Germany because he was Jewish. In 1938, he was imprisoned in Dachau concentration camp, but was released after five weeks. In 1939, Selz emigrated to the Netherlands, teaching and researching (sometimes unofficially) in Amsterdam until 1943. On 24 July 1943 he was arrested and detained in Westerbork concentration camp. A month later, on 24 August, he was transported to Auschwitz concentration camp. Three days later, on 27 August 1943, Selz died in the vicinity of Auschwitz.

Aside from two pupils, Julius Bahle (a psychologist who applied Selz's psychology of productive thinking to the psychology of musical composition) and Adriaan de Groot, Selz never founded a school and after 1933 his name disappears almost completely from the German psychological literature.

Until recently, his works were largely untranslated from German into English.

In 2004, philosopher and psychologist Michel ter Hark, University of Groningen, published a book called Popper, Otto Selz and the Rise of Evolutionary Epistemology, in which he argues that Karl Popper got part of his ideas from Selz. Selz himself never published these ideas, partly because of the rise of Nazism which forced him to quit his work in 1933, and the prohibition of referencing to Selz' work.

== Works (in German) ==
- 1910: "Die psychologische Erkenntnistheorie und das Transzendenzproblem" ("The psychological theory of knowledge and the problem of transcendence"). Archiv für die gesamte Psychologie 16, 1–110.
- 1913: Über die Gesetze des geordneten Denkverlaufes. Eine experimentelle Untersuchung (On the laws of the orderly thought process. An experimental investigation). Speemann, Stuttgart.
- 1919: (with W. Benary, A. Kronfeld and E. Stern) Untersuchungen über die psychische Eignung zum Flugdienst (Studies on the psychological fitness for flight duty). Schriften zur Psychologie der Berufseignung und des Wirtschaftslebens, Heft 8. Barth, Leipzig.
- 1922: Zur Psychologie der produktiven Denkens und des Irrtums (On the psychology of productive thinking and of error). Cohen, Bonn.
- 1924: Die Gesetze der produktiven und reproduktiven Geistestätigkeit (The laws of the productive and reproductive mental activity). Cohen, Bonn.
- 1991: Wahrnehmungsaufbau und Denkprozeß (Perceptual system and thought process). Selected writings, edited by A. Métraux and T. Hermann. Huber, Bern. ISBN 3-456-81941-2.

== See also ==
- Theodor Lipps
- Würzburg School
