= Alexander Pfänder =

German philosopher (1870–1941)

Alexander Pfänder (7 February 1870 – 18 March 1941) was a German philosopher who was a member of the Munich phenomenological school.

== Biography ==
Pfänder was born in Iserlohn and spent his entire academic career at the Ludwig-Maximilians-Universität München, where he was a student of Theodor Lipps and one of the founding members of the Munich circle of phenomenologists. As a professor, Pfänder was also influential in conveying and promoting a version of phenomenology that differed from Edmund Husserl's "transcendental" orientation. His early phenomenological analysis of willing (1900) in fact predated Husserl's breakthrough in phenomenology (Logical Investigations, vol. II (1901)).

In spite of his talents as a writer and a teacher, Pfänder did not come into prominence as did Heidegger with Being and Time (1927) and has consequently been overshadowed by subsequent developments out of Heideggerian and Husserlian orientations. Nevertheless, his detailed analyses of various phenomena, such as willing and attitudes (Gesinnungen), have been undeservedly ignored. Moreover, his development of the concept of an "understanding psychology" also merits attention, which has not received its due to its treatment in a work with an unfashionable title (The Soul of Man, 1933).

He died in Munich.

== Works ==
- Phänomenologie des Wollens: Eine psychologische Analyse (1900).
- Logik (1921); English translation: Logic Frankfurt, Ontos Verlag (2009).
- Die Seele des Menschen (1933).

== Sources ==
- 'Pfänder, Alexander (1871–1941)', Encyclopedia of Philosophy
