= Theodor Lipps =

German philosopher

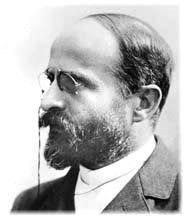
- Born: 28 July 1851; Wallhalben, Kingdom of Bavaria
- Died: 17 October 1914 (aged 63); Munich, German Empire

Education
- Education: University of Bonn
- Doctoral advisor: Jürgen Bona Meyer (Dr. phil. hab. advisor)

Philosophical work
- Era: 19th-century philosophy
- Region: Western philosophy
- School: Munich phenomenology
- Institutions: Ludwig-Maximilians-Universität München
- Doctoral students: Adolf Reinach
- Notable students: Johannes Daubert; Moritz Geiger; Dietrich von Hildebrand; Max Scheler; Margarete Susman
- Main interests: Aesthetics, epistemology
- Notable ideas: Lipps–Meyer law, psychic resonance

Theodor Lipps (German: [lɪps]; 28 July 1851 – 17 October 1914) was a German philosopher, known for his theory regarding aesthetics, creating the framework for the concept of Einfühlung (empathy), defined as, "projecting oneself onto the object of perception." This has then led onto opening up a new branch of interdisciplinary research in the overlap between psychology and philosophy.

== Biography ==
Lipps was one of the most influential German university professors of his time, attracting many students from other countries. Lipps was very concerned with conceptions of art and the aesthetic, focusing much of his philosophy around such issues. Among his fervent admirers was Sigmund Freud. There were at least two theories that made an impact on Freud's works. The first was Lipps' theory of the unconscious mental events. Lipps was then a main supporter of the idea of the unconscious. The second was Lipps' works on humor.

=== Einfühlung ===
Lipps adapted Robert Vischer's notions of empathy or esthetic sympathy (Einfühlung, literally translated to "feeling-into"). He was responsible for popularizing the term by modifying Vischer's conceptualization. Particularly, Lipps concealed some of the thinker's mysticism, hiding it within the sphere of scientific psychology in his work, Aesthetics of Space and Geometrical Illusions. The term was used to describe the process of contemplating art objects as representation of our feelings. Lipps developed it into an aesthetic theory, which was refined further by other thinkers such as Roger Fry and Vernon Lee.

The concept of psychic resonance finds parallels throughout aesthetic philosophy. In this concept, empathy is said to begin with both the object and the pleasure drawn together in a single act instead of a separate object with which we have aesthetic enjoyment or with pleasure taken in an object. According to Lipps, empathy incorporates movement or activity, which is bound up with observed object by: 1) being derived from it; and, 2) by being inseparable from it. For his works, he is considered one of the most important representatives of the psychology of aesthetics alongside Stephan Witasek and Johannes Volkelt.

=== Psychologism ===
Lipps was an important adherent of psychologism early in his career. This philosophy was based on the neo-Kantianism that became influential in German philosophy during the second half of the nineteenth century. He became a spokesman of this school as evidenced in his early publications. In his work, Logik (1893), he declared his "unlimited foundational logical psychologism", which is based on a partial identity of psychology of thinking and the logic of thinking. Here, logic is considered the "physics of thinking" rather than an "ethics of thinking". According to Lipps, "logic is a psychological discipline, as certain as the cognition occurs only in the psyche, and the thinking, which completes itself in the cognition, is a psychical event."

Late in life, Lipps adopted some ideas from Edmund Husserl as he developed in another direction. Disliking his psychologism, some of his students joined with some of Husserl's to form a new branch of philosophy called phenomenology of essences. Among them there was Moritz Geiger who wrote one of the first phenomenological essays on the essence and meaning of empathy in which the influence of Lipps is relevant. There was also Paul Ferdinand Linke who studied under Lipps at the Ludwig-Maximilians-Universität München and dealt with Husserlian phenomenology in his first publication, Die phänomenale Sphäre.

In the so-called aesthetics of "oughtness", Lipps attempted to reconcile "ought" with "is".

== Lipps illusion ==
Lipps illusion

The Lipps illusion is a geometric-optical directional illusion discovered by the Lipps. It consists of the fact that parallel lines are no longer perceived as parallel due to inserted kinks. The human perception compensates for kinked lines by perceiving them as approximately straight. The middle sections of the five polygons, each consisting of three segments, are perceived as tilted relative to each other, even though they are parallel. This is caused by the alternating downward and upward orientation of the outer segments. This phenomenon is illustrated in the left part of the diagram. The right side of the illustration clarifies the parallelism of the middle sections.

== See also ==
- Otto Selz

== Sources ==
- Hatfield, G. (2001). "Psychology Old and New". Institute for Research in Cognitive Science Technical Report No.IRCS-01-07. University of Pennsylvania. Archived from the original on July 24, 2010.
- Lyubimova, T. "On the Comic", in: Aesthetics, Art, Life: A Collection of Articles, compiled by T. Lyubimova, M. Ovsyannikov; general editorship by A. Zis; translated from the Russian by Sergei Syrovatkin (Moscow: Raduga Publishers, 1988), pp. 200–211.
