= Hedwig Conrad-Martius =

German philosopher

- Born: February 27, 1888; Berlin, German Empire
- Died: February 15, 1966 (aged 77); Starnberg, West Germany
- Spouse: Theodor Conrad

Education
- Education: Ludwig-Maximilians-Universität München; University of Göttingen
- Academic advisor: Adolf Reinach

Philosophical work
- Era: 20th-century philosophy
- Region: Western philosophy
- School: Munich phenomenology
- Institutions: Ludwig-Maximilians-Universität München
- Main interests: Ontology

Hedwig Conrad-Martius (27 February 1888 – 15 February 1966) was a German phenomenologist who became a Christian mystic.

== Biography ==
She initially considered a literary career, but later became interested in philosophy. This started at the Ludwig-Maximilians-Universität München. She also studied at the University of Göttingen. To celebrate its foundation festival, the University of Göttingen gave in 1912 a prize to the best original work on a philosophical topic. The names of all competitors were sealed, opened only after declaring a winner. Of about 200 philosophical works, only hers, titled "The Intuitional-Theoretical Principles of Positivism", was awarded the prize. She later became known for work on an ontology of reality.

She also married Theodor Conrad who helped provide for her, as at this time women academics tended to struggle to make a living. As she had one Jewish grandparent her work was stalled by the rise of Nazism. At some point, she became religiously active as a Protestant.

== Connection to Edith Stein ==
Edith Stein's interest in Catholicism came during a visit to her home. Although Protestant, Conrad-Martius would late receive a dispensation so she could be Edith Stein's godmother.

== Works ==
- Die erkenntnistheoretischen Grundlagen des Positivismus, Bergzabern 1920
- Metaphysische Gespräche, Halle 1921
- Realontologie, in: Jahrbuch für Philosophie und phänomenologische Forschung, 6 (1923), 159–333
- Zur Ontologie und Erscheinungslehre der realen Außenwelt. Verbunden mit einer Kritik positivistischer Theorien, in: Jahrbuch für Philosophie und phänomenologische Forschung 3 (1916)
- Die „Seele“ der Pflanze. Biologisch-ontologische Betrachtungen, Breslau 1934
- Abstammungslehre, Munich 1949 (Ursprünglich unter dem Titel „Ursprung und Aufbau des lebendigen Kosmos“ erschienen, Kosmos 1938)
- Der Selbstaufbau der Natur, Entelechien und Energien, Hamburg 1944
- Bios und Psyche, Hamburg 1949
- Die Zeit, Munich 1954
- Utopien der Menschenzüchtung. Der Sozialdarwinismus und seine Folgen, Munich 1955
- Das Sein, Munich 1957
- Der Raum, Munich 1958
- Étude sur la Métaphore, Paris 1958
- Die Geistseele des Menschen, Munich 1960
- Schriften zur Philosophie I-III, im Einverständnis mit der Verfasserin herausgeben von Eberhard Avé-Lallemant, Munich 1963–1965
