= Herman Nohl =

German educationist and philosopher (1879–1960)

Herman Julius Nohl; 7 October 1879 – 27 September 1960) was a German philosopher and pedagogue. Informed by his time serving in WWI and witnessing the German youth movement he devoted himself to furthering the development of popular education, helping to establish a democratic folk high school in Thuringia in 1919.

Nohl subsequently became one of the best-known representatives of both reform and humanities pedagogy, working on the foundations of social pedagogy as well as on establishing pedagogy as an independent science. He was Professor of Education at the University of Göttingen, co-editor of the journal Die Erziehung, and founder and editor of the journal Die Sammlung. He wrote several works on aesthetics, educational anthropology, and pedagogy, with "Die Pädagogische Bewegung in Deutschland und ihre Theorie" being considered his main pedagogical work.

== Early life ==
=== Family ===
Nohl was born into a middle-class family on October 7, 1879 in Berlin, Germany. His father Hermann Nohl was a grammar school teacher and the young Nohl lived in an apartment on the grounds of the Berlinisches Gymnasium zum Grauen Kloster throughout his childhood and youth. His mother Gabriele Nohl (née Doepke) died in 1882 when Nohl was three years old and his father later remarried, giving Nohl a total of four siblings: Johannes and Ella from his father's first marriage, and Lotte and Hilde from his father's second marriage to Elise (née Simon).

=== Education ===
Nohl studied medicine at the University of Berlin in the summer semester of 1898 but switched to the Geisteswissenschaften in the winter semester of that year, studying history, philosophy, and German language and literature with Friedrich Paulsen, among others. Paulsen offered Nohl the opportunity to go to Davos as a teacher when his studies finished but Nohl had made contact with Wilhelm Dilthey in 1901 and had established a firm working relationship with him. In 1902 Nohl decided to write a dissertation on Socrates under Dilthey, and on Dilthey's and Paulsen's recommendations he was granted the Jüngken-scholarship, which made him financially independent. In August 1904 Nohl completed his dissertation entitled Socrates and Ethics (Sokrates und die Ethik), a compilation and arrangement of Hegel's Theologischen Jugendschriften nach den Handschriften der Königlichen Bibliothek in Berlin which was printed in 1907.

In 1905 Nohl married the pianist Bertha Oser from Vienna. Bertha was a pupil of Clara Schumann and a cousin of Ludwig Wittgenstein and the marriage ensured Nohl's continued financial independence.

Following Dilthey recommending Nohl to Rudolf Eucken the family moved to Jena in the fall of 1907, where Nohl stayed until the beginning of World War I. He completed various academic works at the University of Jena, including his habilitation thesis on Die Weltanschauungen der Malerei which he finished in 1908 under Eucken.

=== German youth movement ===
During his time in Jena Nohl came into contact with the German youth movement since some of his students were active in it. He became friends with Eugen Diederichs and acquainted with Gustav Wyneken's Landerziehungsheim in Wickersdorf, and these early experiences were important for the development of his pedagogy, as he described in a chapter of his book Die pädagogische Bewegung in Deutschland und ihre Theorie, published in 1935.

Nohl saw the youth movement as changing the relationship between pedagogy and the generations, and as having an educational effect in itself. He saw it as part of a "German movement" that had lasted over 150 years including the Sturm und Drang and Romantic periods, a recurring epoch "in which the young forces of our people struggled for a new content in life". He saw the movement as seeking, "the new unity of a higher spiritual life, which ultimately takes root in the metaphysical foundation of our existence [...] and revives the dead forms of culture and reshapes them from within". He saw parallels between the young Herder, the young Goethe, and the youth movement, such as "the feeling of the obsolescence of the previous generation, the demand for a new youth, [with] nature, art, and religion as the three liberating powers, a new humanity that cannot be separated from an original German nationality, in which at the same time the contrasts between the classes and denominations that tear Germany apart are abolished". Nohl cited "the intrinsic importance of being young [...], the focus on the present and future [...] and, most importantly, a new belief in the nature of man" as the main characteristics of the movement. He was a nature-loving person, which fitted in with the ideals of the youth movement, and his own children were active in the Wandervogel, regularly going on hiking trips.

Nohl developed his first thoughts on a specifically educational relationship as early as 1914 in the essay Das Verhältnis der Generationen in der Pädagogik ("The Relationship of Generations in Pedagogy"), which is understood as a response to the youth movement's claim that young people could organise and lead themselves. For Nohl an educationally relevant relationship between the generations remained necessary, despite the right of the child and adolescent to their own rights. As he put it, "The actual basis of pedagogical work lies in the relationship between the two generations, because it is not what it teaches, but precisely this real relationship itself that is its deepest content and its ultimate condition".

== World War I and after ==
Nohl was conscripted into the army in the summer of 1915 as a Landsturm and stationed in a barracks in Weimar. He spent the war as part of the occupying army in Ghent, where he was mainly assigned administrative tasks due to a knee injury and his short-sightedness. His conviction of the war's legitimacy and his initial enthusiasm for it changed over the course of the war and after the death of several friends. He realised how senseless and contradictory the war was when he met up with Belgian friends at the same time as soldiers from Germany and Belgium were killing each other on the Western Front.

Nohl returned to Jena in November 1918, devoting himself to popular education and becoming a founding member of the democratic folk high school in Thuringia in 1919. At the instigation of his friend Georg Misch, Nohl succeeded him in the summer of 1919 in an extraordinary chair for practical philosophy with a special focus on education at the University of Göttingen, and on May 8, 1922 he became a full professor of education. He would remain in Göttingen, developing his theories of pedagogy, until his forced dismissal from the civil service in 1937.

Nohl joined the Social Work Guild founded by his student Curt Bondy in 1925 and together with Aloys Fischer, Wilhelm Flitner, Theodor Litt, and Eduard Spranger (whom he had met at boarding school) they founded the journal Die Erziehung: Monatsschrift für den Zusammenhang von Kultur und Erziehung in Wissenschaft und Leben, which championed a humanities-oriented pedagogy. Nohl was involved in the reform of the pedagogical academies in Prussia in 1926, and starting in 1928 he and Ludwig Pallat published the five-volume Handbuch der Pädagogik. In 1929 Nohl sought a connection to actual educational practice by founding a home in Lippoldsberg affiliated to the pedagogical seminar in Göttingen, where he held didactic courses for teachers in pedagogical seminars and combined theoretical knowledge with pedagogical practice.

In 1931 Nohl presented a plan for a "national educational organisation within the framework of aid to the East". Further lectures from 1931 and 1932 emphasised the national aspect of education and were published in 1933 as Landbewegung, Osthilfe und die Aufgabe der Pädagogik.

== Aspects of his pedagogy ==
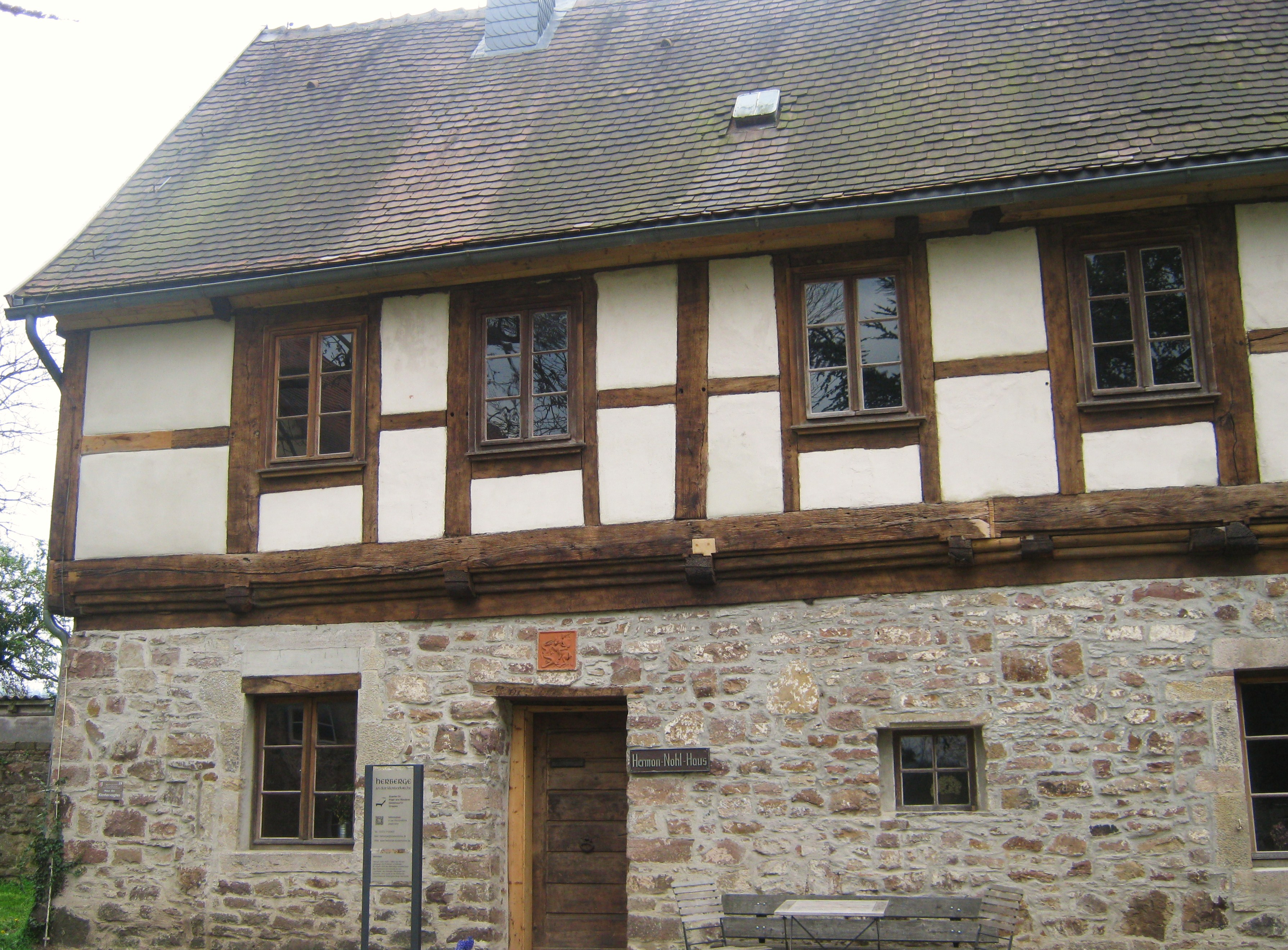
The Herman-Nohl-Haus on the grounds of the Lippoldsberg monastery, now a group accommodation and pilgrims' hostel

=== "Educational reality" ===
Nohl's pedagogy was oriented towards the totality of pedagogical phenomena, and based on the concepts of the customer ("Kunde") and pre-scientific knowledge ("vorwissenschaftlichen Wissens"). Accordingly, education represents a reality of life that has always existed and the practice of education is therefore older than scientific reflection on it and thus has its own value. The experience of education ("Erziehungserfahrung") is the result of a possibly unconscious, but in each case very specific question.

As a result of his intervention in the discussions surrounding the school reform of 1927, Nohl formulated the postulate of the "relative autonomy" of education as a demarcation from political claims to power. Accordingly, education is primarily derived from the reality of education, which served Nohl as the starting point for a universally valid theory of education. He argued that Dilthey's concept of education as a "planned activity through which adults seek to educate the souls of adolescents" should be understood, for according to Nohl, the reason for the autonomy of pedagogy lay in the "fact of educational reality as a meaningful whole". The pedagogical idea determines the meaning of that reality, and this also determines the independence of education and its boundary to other areas of society. Pedagogy should therefore assess economic, religious, or political interests from its own point of view, rejecting them if necessary rather than subordinating itself to these interests.

=== "Pedagogical reference" ===
Nohl first used the term "pedagogical reference" in his Sozialpädagogischen Vorträgen lectures on social pedagogy in 1924 and 1925. In his 1924 lecture Die Pädagogik der Verwahrlosten ("The Pedagogy of the Neglected") he named pedagogical reference as a possible cause of neglect, alongside disposition and milieu. In 1925, he called for an unconditional soul connection with the young person in the period of maturity:

However, this connection to the soul can only be maintained if the pedagogical relationship is constantly reshaped at the right time in line with the child's development, if the young person's desire to assert himself and his desire for independence are taken into account and his new spirituality is nourished with the food it requires.

— Herman Nohl – Jugendwohlfahrt. Sozialpädagogische Vorträge

He saw the acquisition of a pedagogical reference as the prerequisite for a pedagogical relationship in general. According to Nohl, the relationship between pupil and educator was a community in which both were dependent on each other:

The basis of education is the educational community between the educator and the pupil with his or her will to learn.

— Herman Nohl – Die Theorie der Bildung

As with Dilthey, for Nohl the relationship between an adult and a younger person formed the basis for educational action. In this way, education is no longer conceived only in asymmetrical relationships but also as a personal choice based on sympathy. According to Nohl, the starting point of education was not the demands of society but the sensitivities and learning needs of the adolescent himself. The starting point should be the difficulties that the child has and not those that the child makes for the educator or the parents. The educator should step out of his role as a purely professional interested party and fill his task with passion (Leidenschaft):

The basis of education is therefore the passionate relationship of a mature human being to a developing human being, for his own sake, so that he may come to his life and his form. This educational relationship is built on an instinctive foundation that is rooted in people's natural relationships to life and their sexuality.

— Herman Nohl – Die Theorie der Bildung

From this Nohl derived the following points which he considered decisive for the pedagogical reference:

- The relationship has an emotional component (passion);
- The pedagogical reference is fundamentally based on different levels of development, which requires maturity from the educator (relationship of a mature person to a developing person); and
- Educational action is not derived from external goals and purposes but is primarily oriented towards the pupil (for his or her own sake).

=== "Pedagogical love" ===
Nohl resisted a sexual valuation of this love relationship ("Liebesverhältnisses") between educator and pupil. Rather, he thought it should become a passion ("Leidenschaft") for the pupil's talents and therefore much more than any sexual aspect. He advocated a form of platonic love or pedagogical eros which aims to draw out the potential of adolescents, to recognize their individuality, to promote it, and at the same time to ensure that they remain socially acceptable.

The true love of the teacher is the elevating love and not the desiring love [...] The pedagogical love for the child is the love for his ideal [...] Thus pedagogical love demands empathy for the child and his dispositions, for the possibilities of his image, always with a view to his perfect life.

— Herman Nohl – Die Theorie der Bildung

For Nohl the focus here was on the aspect of pedagogical love for its own sake, i.e. that the educator is not the executor of the interests of third parties or society. Not the demands of society, but the sensitivities and learning needs of the adolescent himself should be the starting point of educational activity, and education is therefore "decisively characterised by the fact that it has its starting point absolutely in the pupil, that is, that it does not feel itself to be the executor of any objective powers towards the pupil". For Nohl, the foundation of the pedagogical relationship was pedagogical love based on the model of motherly and fatherly love, which should be detached from its instinctive behavior. Nohl understood uplifting love ("hebende Liebe") as a spiritual behavior of its own kind, which is directed towards the higher form of the developing human being. According to Nohl, the so-called pedagogical community is supported "by two powers: Love and authority, or seen from the child's perspective: Love and obedience". Education as a relationship, as Nohl understood it, is established by the educator earning the pupil's favor through knowledge and empathy. The educator's authority should develop from the educator's personal qualities. This is achieved on the one hand through affection and eros, and on the other through the appreciation of achievements whereby educational action has the character of a risk and can therefore also fail.

According to Nohl, even if pedagogy was solely at the service of the child it should not be an end in itself but should also be committed to objective contents and objectives. According to Nohl, education is not realised in the mere adaptation of the pupil to social conditions but rather in the adaptation of such concerns to the pupil. As a result, the social and individual perspectives come into play, but always with the pupil in mind. At this point, the pedagogical reference sees itself as an advocate for the child.

The present and the future should be linked in the educator's actions. However, future possibilities and the goals derived from them should in no way prevent the fulfilment of present concerns and needs. Rather, Nohl saw an intrinsic value in every stage of a child's life, indeed in every moment, "which must not be sacrificed merely to the future, but demands its independent fulfilment".

The basic attitude with which the pedagogue faces the child is therefore a peculiar mixture of realistic and ideal vision, which results from the insight into the two-sidedness of the human being.

— Herman Nohl – Charakter und Schicksal. Eine pädagogische Menschenkunde

=== Moral autonomy ===
According to Nohl, unconditional obedience and the breaking of the pupil's self-will should be replaced by independence and activity, culminating in moral autonomy. The pedagogical relationship is therefore not a one-sided relationship of influence between the educator and the pupil, but rather one of interaction. Nohl spoke of a modern and active pedagogy that no longer sees its counterpart as a merely passively receiving object of educational actions and measures. The educator has a certain advantage over the pupil, on which their authority is based. The pupil, on the other hand, contributes to this relationship as a distinctive personality with spontaneity, as well as someone possessing as yet undiscovered future possibilities, which are to be discovered and promoted through the pedagogical relationship.

However, it should not be forgotten that such a relationship cannot be forced, as "irrational factors such as sympathy and antipathy" are at work, which neither the educator nor the pupil can influence. For this reason, the educator should "not be offended or even let the pupil take it out on him if he does not succeed in establishing a relationship". A relationship based on freedom and free will always includes the possibility of failure, whereby the recognition of the subjectivity and sovereignty of the pupil can be demonstrated. Nohl saw a significant advance in pedagogy in the insight ("Erkenntnis") that the pupil has his or her own right ("Eigenrecht") and that taking this into account is what makes pedagogical work possible in the first place. In order for this pedagogical work to be possible, the failure of the pedagogical relationship on the part of the educator must not lead to offense and certainly not to reproaches towards the pupil, but must bring about a bond with someone else, "if only the bond takes place at all".

Education ends when a person comes of age, i.e., according to Schleiermacher, when the younger generation is equal to the older generation in its independent contribution to the fulfillment of the moral task; pedagogy therefore has the goal of making itself superfluous and becoming self-education.

— Herman Nohl – Die Theorie der Bildung

The pedagogical reference is therefore not timelessly valid, but a fact of historical change in pedagogical relationships or opinions. Elements such as authority, obedience, and trust are therefore not fixed values, but are always to be renegotiated between the generations and their content redefined. The pedagogical relationship also contains a tendency towards separation from the outset. With each developmental progress of the pupil, both sides, educator and pupil, strive to dissolve the pedagogical relationship. Even though all education is geared towards independence, the fundamental relationship between the generations remains intact. Pedagogues as advocates of the child, according to Nohl, would have to reshape the demands of society, but without the abandonment of these demands.

"[W]hatever demands the child may be confronted with from objective culture and social relations, it must accept a reshaping that arises from the question: what meaning does this demand have in the context of this child's life for its development and the increase of its strength, and what means does this child have to cope with it?"

— Herman Nohl – Die pädagogische Bewegung in Deutschland und ihre Theorie

This transformation should therefore be designed in such a way that the child's abilities are enhanced. The demands of society should be viewed from the context of meaning and the possibilities of the child. Pedagogy should therefore represent a balance between the subjective life of the pupil and the demands of objective culture. It would therefore be uneducational if the educator decided unilaterally in favor of either the subjective life of the pupil or the objective culture.

== National Socialism and World War II ==
Two of Nohl's daughters emigrated during the National Socialist era because their husbands were denied employment at German universities. Nohl and his wife sent their only son to Kurt Hahn in Scotland so that he could grow up in a better political atmosphere, and Nohl's wife also wanted to emigrate due to the political situation. Many of Nohl's pupils also emigrated abroad after being dismissed from their teaching work.

Without foreseeing these developments Nohl initially welcomed the "seizure of control" by the Nazis as an opportunity to realise his pedagogical ideals: "Much of what the pedagogical movement, together with the youth movement and the adult education movement, had been struggling for since the end of the war has suddenly come within reach. At a stroke, political power has realised the external unity of will, which is also the elementary prerequisite for national education."

Even earlier, Nohl's writings were characterised by völkisch nationalism ideas. He called for a "national pedagogy" that would take account of Germany's special political situation, and in lectures on "aid to the East" Nohl formulated ideas that were also reflected in education under National Socialism: Eastern colonisation was intended to initiate a development "without [which] a nation gradually loses its blood, which increases our domestic market, gives new living space for unemployed people and, last but not least, consolidates our national position in the East". He wrote that, "our German destiny is being decided here in the East. This East is not only 'the country' to a special degree, but the East has once again become the battlefield of history". In his lectures in the winter semester of 1933/34 at Göttingen University entitled Die Grundlagen der nationalen Erziehun ("The Foundations of National Education") he suggested that this battle was to be about the "defense against inferior germs".

Nohl's ideas on Eastern pedagogy also contained elements reminiscent of the blood and soil ideology, some of which would be later implemented by the National Socialists in their educational programs. The image of women that Nohl formulated in this context also later showed parallels to that of Women in National Socialism. He spoke of an "inner movement in female existence" that was developing a "new self-consciousness of the function of women in culture", which "in turning away from the old emancipation of women, wants to be based again on their creative powers in the family and at home ..."

In his book Character and Destiny (Charakter und Schicksal), published in 1938 and reprinted in 1947 and 1967, he wrote the following, among other things:

The decisive cause of race formation, i.e. the transformation of the predispositions themselves, is not mutation, but selection. This is the only place where eugenics and pedagogy can come into play. However, as the well-known racial researcher F. Lenz said at the Natural Scientists' Meeting in Stuttgart (1938), such selection also requires a mental climate in which people of insight, initiative, and ability thrive.

— Herman Nohl – Charakter und Schicksal

However, in April 1937 Nohl was dismissed as a university professor, "with all honors and a full salary". The reasons are unclear but presumably it was because Berta Nohl's mother was a Wittgenstein and she herself was Ludwig Wittgenstein's cousin, in other words half-Jewish. Nohl was listed as a Förderndes Mitglied der SS (i.e. financial contributor to the SS) in the Nazi university teachers' register.

In March 1943 the then 64-year-old was drafted into factory work which lasted until the end of the year. He spent the end of the war in the Lippoldsberger Landheim.

== After World War II ==
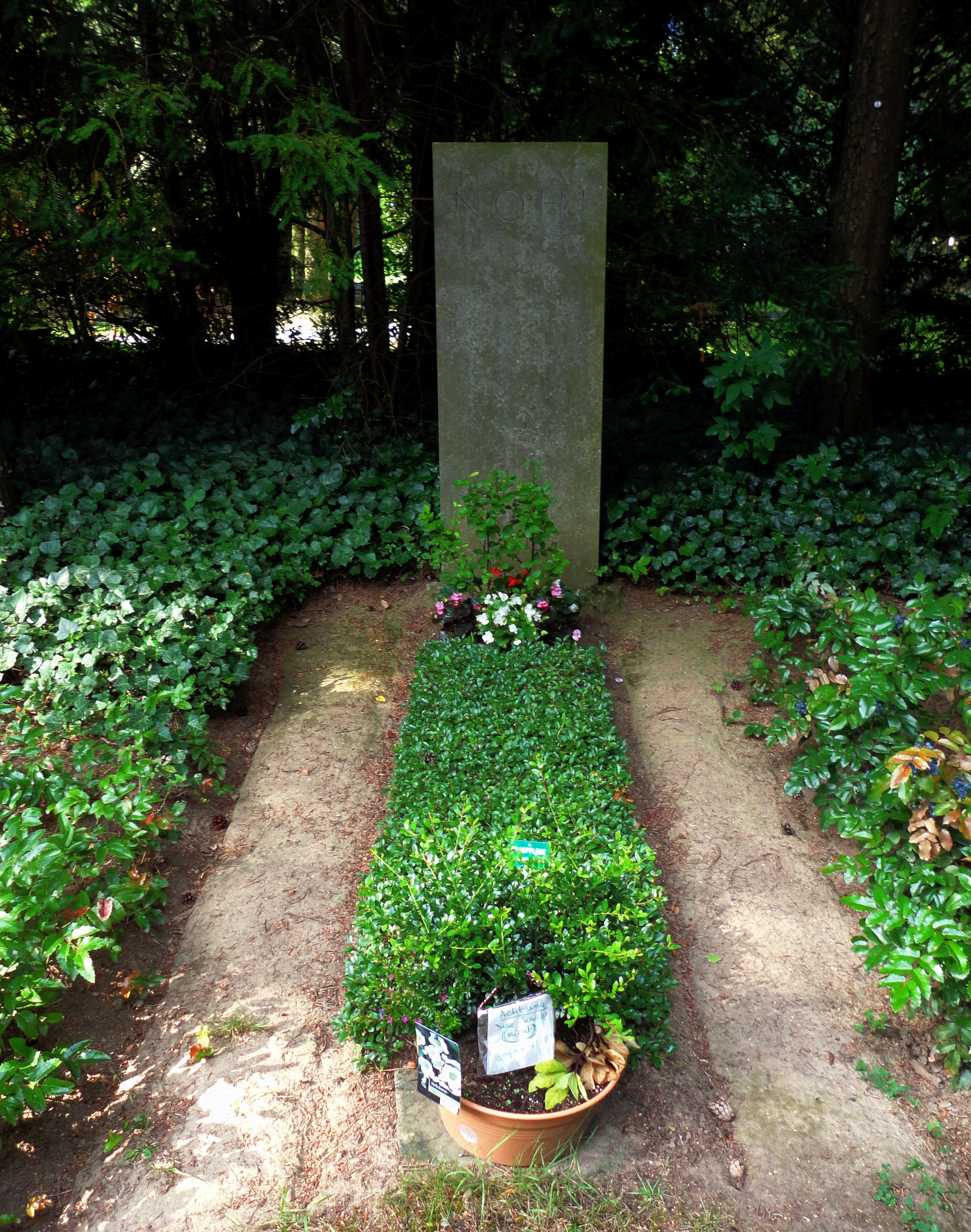
Herman Nohl's tombstone in Gottingen municipal cemetery

After the end of World War II the British occupation authorities allowed Nohl to help with reconstruction in various educational areas. Among other things, he worked on reopening schools as quickly as possible and was a municipal school inspector in Göttingen. In August 1945 he was involved in the "Marienau curricula" for the rebuilding of the school system.

He achieved one of his main goals with the reopening of Göttingen University on September 17, 1945, not only being re-appointed as a professor again but also being made dean of his department. As such he became the contact person for many people having difficulties with denazification due to their affiliation with National Socialist organisations, using his influence to help some people obtain a more favourable classification. One of his students was Leonhard Froese, who received his doctorate in educational science in Göttingen in 1949.

In 1945 Nohl founded the Institut für Erziehung und Unterricht ("Institute for Education and Teaching") and was also editor of the journal Die Sammlung: Zeitschrift für Kultur und Erziehung (1945–1960) which was succeeded by Neue Sammlung, thereby having a significant influence on post-war education. He retired at his own request in 1949.

Nohl was frequently ill in the last years of his life, dying on September 27, 1960 in his house on Hohen Weg in Göttingen's eastern district of Ostviertel. His tomb is a simple limestone stele at the cemetery pond.

== Honors ==
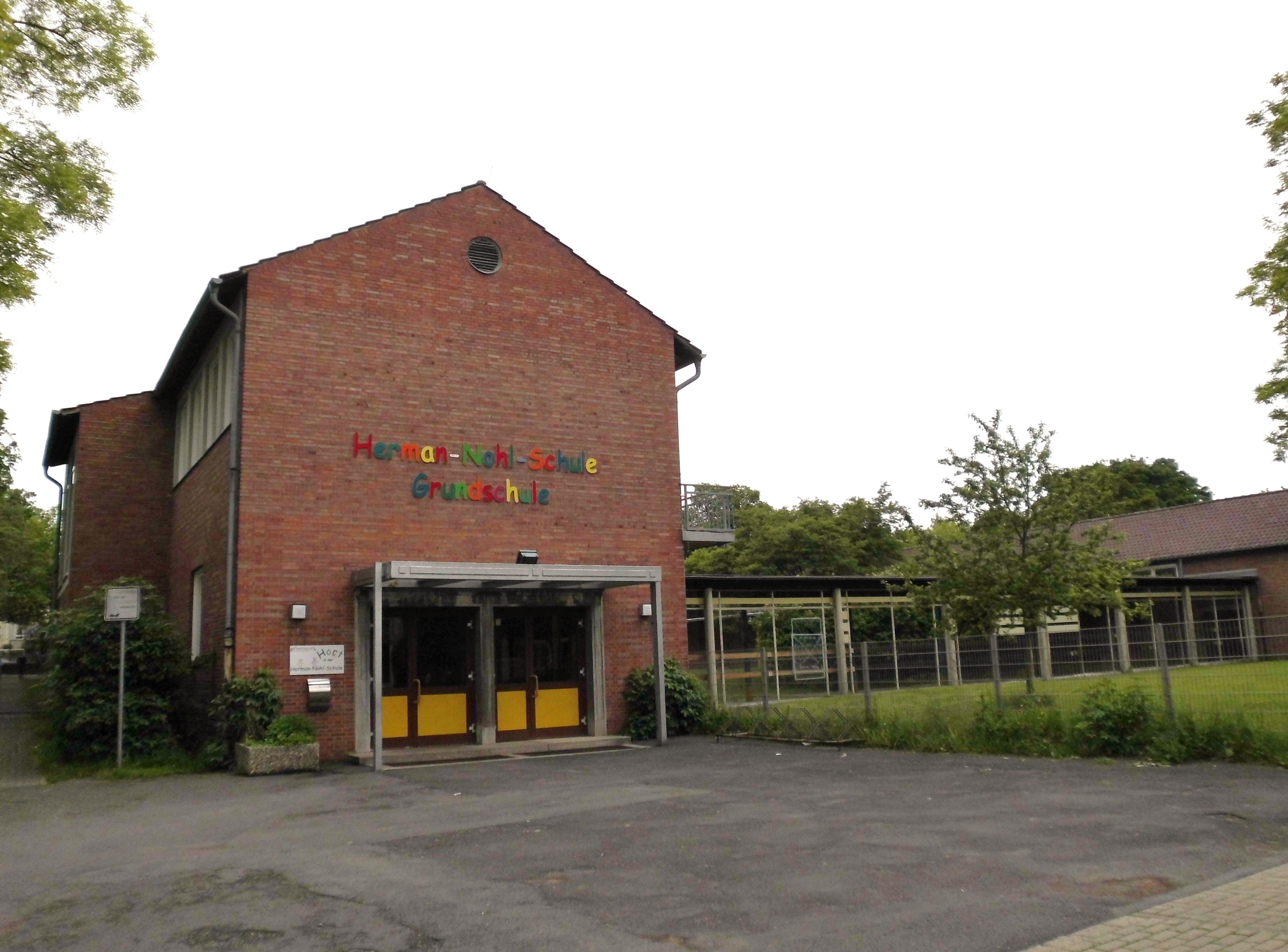
Herman Nohl School in the southern part of Göttingen

Nohl received many honours in Göttingen, his place of work for much of his life, including:

- On June 28, 1953 he was made an honorary citizen of the city.
- A Göttingen memorial plaque has hung on Nohl's former home at Hermann-Föge-Weg 4 in the eastern district of Ostviertel since 1979.
- There has been a "Nohlstraße" in the Göttingen district of Weende since 1969.
- The elementary school designed by architect Diez Brandi in Göttingen's Südstadt district (Immanuel-Kant-Straße 44) has borne the name "Herman-Nohl-School" since 1959. In 2025 its renaming was discussed at the request of the school itself. The reason given was that Nohl's writings "were characterised by nationalist ideas, including the ideology of blood and soil. Herman Nohl's image of women also no longer fits in with modern times and showed parallels to National Socialism. Furthermore, Herman Nohl is said to have been listed as a member of the Schutzstaffel (SS) and the National Socialist German Workers' Party (NSDAP) in the university teachers' register of the Georg August University of Göttingen". However, the justification for Nohl's conviction was described as scientifically "very questionable" because it was not based on sufficient source evidence. Nevertheless the Göttingen City Council voted unanimously in May 2025 to change the school's name to the neutral "Grundschule Südstadt".

Outside of Göttingen Nohl receive the following honours, amongst others:

- An honorary doctorate from the Faculty of Law at the University of Hamburg;
- A Goethe Plaque of the City of Frankfurt, 1959;
- In Osnabrück, a special needs school focusing on emotional and social development is named after him;
- In Hildesheim, a vocational school specialising in nursing and health is named after him;
- In Berlin, the German-Italian European School in Britz is named "Herman-Nohl-Schule";
- In Kirchheimbolanden, the Heilpädagogium Schillerhain, a private school, is named "Herman-Nohl-Schule"; and
- From 1960 to 2012 Lippoldsberg was home to the "Nohl House", which Hermann Nohl had purchased in 1929 and made available to the Göttingen Pedagogical Seminary.

== Writings ==
- Sokrates und die Ethik. Tübingen/Leipzig 1904.
- Die Weltanschauungen der Malerei. Jena 1908.
- Pädagogische und politische Aufsätze. Jena 1919.
- Stil und Weltanschauung. Jena 1920.
- Jugendwohlfahrt. Leipzig 1927.
- Die ästhetische Wirklichkeit: eine Einführung. Frankfurt am Main 1935 (2. Auflage 1954).
- Die pädagogische Bewegung in Deutschland und ihre Theorie. 1935 (online from Google Books).
- Einführung in die Philosophie. 1935 (9. A. Frankfurt am Main 1998).
- Charakter und Schicksal. Eine pädagogische Menschenkunde, 1938 (3. verm. Auflage. 1947, wieder Frankfurt am Main 1967).
- Die sittlichen Grunderfahrungen. Eine Einführung in die Ethik. 1939 (3. Auflage. Frankfurt am Main 1949).
- Pädagogik aus dreißig Jahren. Frankfurt am Main 1949.
- Friedrich Schiller. Frankfurt am Main 1954.
- Erziehergestalten. 1958 (3. A. Göttingen 1965).
- Die deutsche Bewegung: Vorlesungen und Aufsätze zur Geistesgeschichte von 1770–1830. (Hrsg. Otto Friedrich Bollnow, Frithjof Rodi). Göttingen 1970.
- Das historische Bewußtsein. (Hrsg. Erika Hoffmann, Rudolf Joerden). Göttingen 1979.
- Hrsg. mit Ludwig Pallat: Handbuch der Pädagogik. 5 Bände, Langensalza 1928–33 (10. Auflage, Frankfurt am Main 1988; online).
- Walter Thys (Hrsg.): Ein Landsturmmann im Himmel. Flandern und der Erste Weltkrieg in den Briefen von H.N. an seine Frau. Leipzig 2005.
- Herman Nohls Schriften und Artikel in der NS-Zeit. Dokumente 1933–1945. Goethe-Universität, Frankfurt am Main 2008.

== See also ==
- Volkshaus Jena
