= SMT =

SMT may refer to:

== Businesses and organisations ==
=== Based in Scotland ===
- Scottish Mortgage Investment Trust (LSE stock symbol: SMT)
- Scottish Motor Traction, a defunct bus operator

=== Based in the United States ===
- SMT (media company), a provider of live sports scoring
- Seismic Micro-Technology, a seismology software developer
- Society for Music Theory, a learned society

== Rail transport ==
- St Margarets railway station (Hertfordshire), England
- Semarang Tawang railway station, Indonesia
- Shanghai maglev train, a Transrapid line in China

== Science and technology ==
- Satisfiability modulo theories, in computer science and logic
- Simultaneous multithreading, in computing, hardware multithreading techniques for superscalar CPU optimization
- Statistical machine translation, in computational linguistics
- Sulfamethazine, an antibiotic drug
- Surface-mount technology, in electronics
- Heinrich Hertz Submillimeter Telescope, Arizona, United States

== Other uses ==
- Senior management team, at schools in the UK
- Shin Megami Tensei, a Japanese multimedia franchise
- Shrimati (Smt.), an Indian feminine honorific
- Simte language, spoken in India (ISO 639-3 code)
- Social mirror theory
