= Otto Friedrich Bollnow =

German philosopher and teacher (1903–1991)

- Born: March 14, 1903; Stettin, German Empire
- Died: February 7, 1991 (aged 87); Tübingen, Germany
- Occupation: Philosopher

Otto Friedrich Bollnow (German: [ˈbɔlnoː]; 14 March 1903 – 7 February 1991) was a German philosopher and teacher.

== Biography ==
He was born the son of a rector in Stettin in what was then northwest Germany (now Szczecin, Poland) and went to school in the town of Anklam. After gaining his Abitur (school leaving certificate) he studied mathematics and physics at the University of Göttingen, where he was influenced by the philosopher Herman Nohl. Bollnow received a doctorate in physics in 1925 and successfully completed his habilitation with Georg Misch at Göttingen in 1931. He taught at Göttingen for some years without being appointed to the faculty. Bollnow was a member of the Militant League for German Culture.

In 1933 Bollnow signed the Vow of allegiance of the Professors of the German Universities and High-Schools to Adolf Hitler and the National Socialistic State.

In 1939 he moved to the University of Gießen then briefly to the University of Kiel, to the University of Mainz and finally in 1953 to a chair in contemporary philosophy, philosophical anthropology and ethics at the University of Tübingen. He taught at Tübingen until his retirement in 1970.

Bollnow developed the work of Wilhelm Dilthey on hermeneutics and was concerned with the philosophical foundations of pedagogy. He also concerned himself with the foundations of philosophy and with phenomenology and existential philosophy. Martin Heidegger charged Bollnow with "having launched [...] the starkest misinterpretation of Being and Time" ("die gröbste Mißdeutung von Sein und Zeit [...] auf die Bahn gebracht").

In 1980 he received the Lessing-Prize, a literary and cultural honour endowed by German Freemasons.

He died in Tübingen.

== Works ==
- Die Lebensphilosophie F. H. Jacobis, Stuttgart 1933, 2nd edition, 1966
- Dilthey. Eine Einführung in seine Philosophie, Teubner, Leipzig 1936. 4th edition, Novalis, Schaffhausen 1980, ISBN 3-7214-0073-9
- Das Wesen der Stimmungen, Klostermann, Frankfurt a.M. 1941, 8th ed., 1995, ISBN 978-3-465-02802-4
- Existenzphilosophie, Kohlhammer Verlag, Stuttgart 1943, 8th edition, 1978
- Die Ehrfurcht, Klostermann, Frankfurt a.M., 1947, 2nd edition 1958
- Das Verstehen, Drei Aufsätze zur Theorie der Geisteswissenschaften, Kirchheim Mainz 1949
- Rilke, Kohlhammer, Stuttgart 1951, 2nd edition 1955
- Die Pädagogik der deutschen Romantik, Von Arndt bis Fröbel, Kohlhammer, Stuttgart 1952, 3rd edition 1977
- Unruhe und Geborgenheit im Weltbild neuerer Dichter. Acht Essays, Stuttgart 1955, 3rd edition 1972
- Neue Geborgenheit. Das Problem einer Überwindung des Existenzialismus. Stuttgart 1955, 4th edition 1979
- Die Lebensphilosophie, Berlin-Göttingen-Heidelberg 1958
- Wesen und Wandel der Tugenden, Frankfurt a.M., 1958
- Existenzphilosophie und Pädagogik. Versuch über unstetige Formen der Erziehung. Kohlhammer, Stuttgart 1959, 5th edition 1977
- Mensch und Raum. Kohlhammer, Stuttgart 1963, 4th edition 1980
- die macht des worts. Sprachphilosophische Überlegungen aus pädagogischer Perspektive, Neue Deutsche Schule, Essen 1964, 3rd edition 1971
- Die pädagogische Atmosphäre. Untersuchung über die gefühlsmäßigen zwischenmenschlichen Voraussetzungen der Erziehung, Quelle & Meyer, Heidelberg 1964, 4th edition 1970
- Französischer Existentialismus, Stuttgart 1965
- die anthropologische betrachtungsweise in der pädagogik, Neue Deutsche Schule, Essen 1965, 3rd edition 1975
- Sprache und Erziehung, Stuttgart 1966, 3rd edition 1979
- Philosophie der Erkenntnis. Das Vorverständnis und die Erfahrung des Neuen, Stuttgart 1970, 2nd edition 1981
- Das Doppelgesicht der Wahrheit, Philosophie der Erkenntnis, 2nd volume, Stuttgart 1975
- Vom Geist des Übens, Freiburg i. Br, 1978
- Studien zur Hermeneutik Volume I: Zur Philosophie der Geisteswissenschaften, Alber, Freiburg / München 1982, ISBN 3-495-47482-X
- Studien zur Hermeneutik Volume II: Zur hermeneutischen Logik von Georg Misch und Hans Lipps, Alber, Freiburg / München 1983, ISBN 3-495-47513-3
- Otto Friedrich Bollnow im Gespräch, Hrsg. von Hans-Peter Göbbeler und Hans-Ulrich Lessing. Alber, Freiburg / München 1983, ISBN 3-495-47522-2
- Zwischen Philosophie und Pädagogik, Vorträge und Aufsätze, Weitz, Aachen 1988

== Sources ==
- Ralf Koerrenz: Otto Friedrich Bollnow, Ein pädagogisches Portrait, Beltz (UTB), Weinheim/Basel 2004, ISBN 3-8252-2484-8
- Astrid Schollenberger: Grundzüge einer Philosophie der Hoffnung: Die Bedeutung der Krise im philosophischen und pädagogischen Denken von Otto Friedrich Bollnow, Turnshare (London), 2003, ISBN 978-1-903343-31-9
