= Theodor Litt =

German philosopher

Theodor Litt (27 December 1880 – 16 July 1962) was a German culture and social philosopher as well as a pedagogue.

In the debate with Dilthey, Simmel and Cassirer, Litt developed an independent approach in cultural philosophy and philosophical anthropology, which was determined by the dialectical view of the relationship between the individual and society, man and the world, reason and life. At the same time, he projected these thoughts into a geisteswissenschaftliche Pädagogik that had its starting point in progressive education at the beginning of the 20th century and, via Litt's student Wolfgang Klafki, extended into the discussion on educational reform in the 1970s. Litt identified with the Weimar Republic and, as rector of the University of Leipzig, came into conflict with National Socialism, was banned from lecturing in 1937 and retired early. Nevertheless, he continued to publish critically against the ruling ideology. After the end of the Second World War, he could not come to terms with the ideology of the Socialist Unity Party of Germany and therefore moved to the Universität Bonn, where he founded the Institute for pedagogy.

== Life ==
Born in Düsseldorf, Litt was the son of the grammar school professor Ferdinand Litt and great-nephew of the theatre director and actor Hermann Litt. From 1890 to 1898, Litt attended the humanistic Städtisches Gymnasium (today's Humboldt-Gymnasium Düsseldorf) in Düsseldorf. He then began teacher training in philosophy, history and classical philology (with one semester in Berlin) at the Rheinische Friedrich-Wilhelms-Universität Bonn. In Bonn, he became a member of the Sängerverbindung AMV Makaria Bonn, in Berlin of the Akademische Liedertafel in the Sondershäuser Verband. In 1904 he was awarded a doctorate in classical philology with a dissertation written in Latin. After four years as a teacher of ancient languages and history in Bonn, Kreuznach and from 1906 as a senior teacher in Cologne at the Friedrich-Wilhelm-Gymnasium, he was employed for six months as a referent in the Prussian Ministry of Culture in Berlin.

Litt's interest in philosophy and pedagogy is said to have been triggered, among other things, by the Trauma of the First World War. As early as 1919, the University of Bonn appointed Litt as an associate professor of education. In Individual and Community, Litt gave an outline of cultural and social philosophy. Alongside Ernst Troeltsch, Ernst Cassirer and Georg Simmel, Litt became a member of the Leipzig School for social philosophy. In 1920, he succeeded Eduard Spranger, who moved to the University of Berlin, as chair of philosophy and education at the Leipzig University, where he served as university lecturer or rector (1931–1932) until 1937.

In 1927, Litt addressed his pedagogical problems in his work Führen oder Wachsenlassen (Leading or Letting Grow). His rejection of irrational, organological and romantic ideologies as well as his claim to respect for the growing and developing human being led to hostility from the National Socialists. In his inaugural speech as Rector of the University of Leipzig in 1931, he spoke out in favour of maintaining an independent university. For Litt, the Nazi regime ushered in the end of his first creative period from 1919 to 1937. He did not bow to the regime, which attacked his anti-National Socialist stance. At the university association conference in October 1932, Litt suggested a declaration by the university teachers taking a stand against the National Socialist movement. Nevertheless, Litt is named among the signatories of the Vow of allegiance of the Professors of the German Universities and High-Schools to Adolf Hitler and the National Socialistic State of 11 November 1933. In 1934, his lectures were severely disrupted and the University of Leipzig was even temporarily closed. In 1936, Litt ended a lecture tour to Vienna because the Nazi authorities banned him from lecturing. Returning to Leipzig, he demanded his early retirement, which he achieved in 1937.

Litt nevertheless did not let this stop him from publishing the small paper Der deutsche Geist und das Christentum in 1938. In it he criticised Alfred Rosenbergs antisemitic The Myth of the 20th Century, wherein the latter advocated a religion to replace Christianity. Litt found great favour among devout Christians, and the relatively large print run was immediately sold out. But Litt disappointed the rejection by his colleagues who belonged to the humanities pedagogy, such as Eduard Spranger and Wilhelm Flitner, most of whom remained in their chairs during the National Socialist era despite agreeing with Litt's critique. Only Herman Nohl was dismissed from his post in 1937. In 1944, when Litt was also banned from giving lectures at the Saxon Academy of Sciences, he withdrew completely.

Litt's second creative period began in 1945. On Ernst Cassirer's recommendation, he was assigned the task of the democratic reform of Leipzig University. Although Litt taught again in 1946, after a lecture on The Significance of Pedagogical Theory for the Training of Teachers in East Berlin he came into conflict with the Socialist Unity Party of Germany (SED) and took up a professorship in philosophy and education at the Universität Bonn. Litt founded and remained head of the Institute for Educational Sciences until his death. His numerous lectures such as Self-Criticism in Modern Culture or Political Ethics and Pedagogy were just as well received as his paper Die politische Selbsterziehung des deutschen Volkes, which gave rise to the inauguration of a series of papers by the Bundeszentrale für politische Bildung. In 1962, Litt's last publication, Freiheit und Lebensordnung, was published, which again dealt with his confrontation with totalitarian types of power and their political theories.

Litt was a member of the Saxon Academy of Sciences, the Bavarian Academy of Sciences and the Academy of Sciences of the GDR, of the Akademie gemeinnütziger Wissenschaften zu Erfurt and the Österreichische Akademie der Wissenschaften. He was an honorary doctor of the universities in Ludwig-Maximilians-Universität München and the Westfälische Wilhelms-Universität.

Litt died in Bonn at the age of 81.

== Philosophical position ==
=== Dialectical way of thinking ===
As a philosopher, Litt was strongly influenced by the dialectical way of thinking, which was determined by his engagement with Kant and Herder on the one hand and Hegel on the other. Like Eduard Spranger, Herman Nohl, Wilhelm Flitner and Erich Weniger, he is counted in the camp of the Geisteswissenschaftliche Pädagogik. He himself described his position as cultural pedagogy after Ernst Troeltsch, which believed that it could gain pedagogical goals from a historically saturated overall view of the cultural sphere in harmonising dialectics from tradition – covering contradictions and far removed from conflicts of power and interest.

Thinkers such as Georg Simmel, Wilhelm Dilthey and Edmund Husserl also influenced his philosophical worldview. Jonas Cohn's book Theorie der Dialektik inspired him to examine problem areas in pedagogy dialectically. But for Litt, a critical examination of contradictions was not necessary for the purpose of education. For Litt, the dialectic manifests itself in the antinomy of individual and community, in the antinomy of reason and life, and in the opposition of subjective spirit (person) and objective spirit (objective formation of spirit).

With his dialectical way of thinking, Litt aimed to abolish one-dimensional views and their credibility in an all-encompassing context. In doing so, he proceeded rationally, contrarily as well as dialectically at the same time and conceived an extensive philosophy of culture (Individual and Community) as well as a philosophical anthropology (Mensch und Welt). He attempted to bring together the fundamental opposition between cognition and life into an orderly whole by means of an overall view of interpretative ideas. The "free-thinking" educational science of Wolfgang Klafki and the educational reform of the 1960s took up Litt's didactic approach to supporting education in the humanities, but above all in history, with reference to technology, science and the world of work. Talcott Parsons' social theory is also trained on it.

=== History as an overall cultural situation ===
The human being is to be seen in a historical context. Litt understood history not only as the past, but also as the future history shaped by people. He defined history as the "overall cultural situation", by which is meant the totality of what people in a community have created through thought, action and production. History is cultural history in the sense of the spiritual world. Under this condition, education is an "action that is directed in its essence towards the context of the human-social world, that is the spiritual world." But this assumed totality is not so given in the world. Characteristic of the overall cultural situation, one finds rather inequalities, disjunctions and diversities. What is already given in the world is the separate coexistence. Human actions differ in their intentions and goals and therefore exist separately next to each other.

=== Contradiction in the basic dialectical structure ===
By creating syntheses, tensions and contradictions can be resolved. These tensions are not a concept devised by the mind, but a real, antinomic structure of human being. The cause for the contradictory, for the antinomic in the human psyche lies in the dialectical basic structure of human being. The dialectical basic structure cannot be remedied from the outside by psychological measures. These can at most provide information about this contradiction, but not about how the individual is able to deal with enlightenment. In the education of a child, the resolution of the dialectical tensions cannot be realised, because the tensions cling to the educator (leader) just as much as to the person being educated, and he can just as little step out of them. However, Litt did not see the solution to the tensions and contradictions inherent in the human being in letting it grow naturally, especially since this letting it grow would have to be based on the assumption that development is purposeful and meaningful from the outset.

=== Elimination of the tension ===
There is a gulf between human spiritual existence and organic Dasein. Nature does not correspond to "ought" and meaning. Nature does not strive to eliminate contradictions. This is rather the fictitious desire of human beings, because their spirit demands to live in harmony with "All-That-Is" and because it seeks harmonious perfection. The human spirit demands the abolition of contradictions through independent mental work. According to Litt, the being of education can only be understood in terms of its "ought". This "ought" is the synthesis that must be produced in order to recognise contradictions and accept them as given as the product of the human spirit, which has the claim to control contradictions through mental effort and to bring them into harmony. The bringing together of opposing poles is possible for the human spirit because those also originate from it.

=== Man and the world ===
Litt emphasised the importance of the individual: ego and world are dependent on each other and are in a mutual process of development. Litt criticised the one-dimensional interpretation of Hegel, who pushed the individual into the shadows. The objective contents must be absorbed into the life of the respective subject in order to be useful. The term tradition is inseparable from that of individuation. "Man" and "world" have a reciprocal effect on each other and are in a positive dialectical tension with each other in that both work off each other. Through this mutual "working off", both form each other. Man forms himself in his definition of himself, and the world as the totality of spiritual-social-historical content forms itself in its virtuous assertion of claims, which is respected and strengthened.

What regulates the comrades' dealings in the form of custom, manners, morality, law, what guides their actions as a jointly pursued goal of the will, what leads their minds above the hustle and bustle of the earth as a devout certainty: all this comes together to form a structure of obligations against which the arbitrariness of the individual finds its limit.

— Theodor Litt, Mensch und Welt. Munich 1948, p. 24.

Science, work world and technology are designated as the world and are in a mutual interaction with humans. Man forms and creates the world and thus has a Weltbildungscharakter (world-forming character). The areas grouped together as the world are "forming powers".

== School pedagogical position ==
=== Ideals of education ===
For Litt, there is no ideal blueprint of education. Nevertheless, there are educational rubrics, such as religion, science, art and morality, which remain untouchable in their educational character. It is characteristic of society to want to create an educational ideal in order to protect certain contents of education from criticism. This tendency is inappropriate and questionable. On the other hand, it is something else to seek the constructs of the mind for their own sake and to court their meaning and purpose in pure self-forgetfulness. Education can also be purposeful without an educational ideal. Without an ideal design, it aims at the self-forming of the subject in order to come to oneself, by man working his way through to his actual form of existence and thus making himself known. The formation of the human being cannot be concluded from any educational ideal. It is the same with the spirit, which either is or is not. In order to form the self that is conscious, it is necessary to discuss the given world one by one. Neither upbringing nor education need follow an ideal image, be it from religion or politics, in order to make it useful. On the other hand, the free-thinking spirit that wants to come into its own in the world commits itself to education. It is the task of education to educate the free-thinking spirit through the critical examination of the world.

=== Cultural and educational goods ===
Litt emphasises the importance of selecting educational content. Because of the diversity of educational content in pedagogy, it is all the more important to examine its content. No educational content may claim general validity for itself, because its relevance is measured against certain life contexts of the respective culture. Pedagogy must attempt to move from a totality of cultural realities to the individual areas of culture in order to bring a structure to the cultural areas and cultural goods and to classify them according to importance. However, this approach still ignores fundamental decisions about cultural and educational goods. For the observer and enjoyer, a cultural good can have great significance, but without relevance to education. There is no coincidence of cultural goods and educational goods. In order for cultural goods to prove themselves as educational goods, they must fit into the inner movement of the living whole and allow themselves to be related to the whole of youthful soul development. They must correspond to the world views of youth. Once the appropriate educational goods have been selected, they still need to be specified – for an intended target group with a comparable mindset.

=== The mission of education ===
Education teaches man to keep himself and his relationship in order. The person gains better access to realising this. Work, with its objectivity, has a positive effect on the human being. This transfer of life makes it possible for man to conform to the order inherent in work, to grow humanly through work. Litt puts the pedagogisation of society into practice. Even the most functional family could no longer provide the performance that was still conceivable in the times of Pestalozzi or Diesterweg to enable the adolescent to successfully master everyday life. The school was constantly taking on new tasks in order to ensure and support the suitability for everyday life and the personal responsibility of the adolescent. A separation of education and the adult world (professional world) is no longer conceivable. From kindergarten onwards, children would also experience the constraints of the adult world.

=== Educational and vital values ===
The young person should be exposed to classical contents and cultural goods with an educational character of "timeless significance", because these are the actual educational values. Furthermore, in addition to the actual educational values, the school must also take into account and relate to the real demands of life, the social demands. This means that the so-called "vital values" have the same importance as the educational values. A tension arises between the two values that remains incompatible because it cannot be shattered and thus endured.

=== Democratisation of the youth ===
Furthermore, Litt demands that daily political controversies be kept out of the classroom. School should not be misused for party-political purposes. On the other hand, he emphasises the important consolidation of the "youthful" character through spirituality and morality. Despite Litt's rejection of political and school interdependence, he advocates education towards democracy. A functioning school system shows itself through consistency. The school should distance itself from the general intellectual and cultural climate so as not to fall into the false belief that it has to react to political controversies. School has a preserving character because it is able to pass on the "educational solidarity of generations" and is obliged to remain consistent even in times of change.

=== Criticism of the uniform school system ===
Litt advocates the divided school system and categorically rejects the "Einheitsschule" (uniform school). Furthermore, Litt advocates the gymnasial educational directions with their respective core content. The task of the secondary schools is to offer high-achieving pupils a challenging education. The educational diversity offered at secondary schools is very limited at vocational schools, he argues, because students remain experts in one field and general education, which includes learning basic social and intellectual skills, is neglected. This means that the vocational school has the task of opening up and connecting with fundamental areas of existence. It should put culture and history into a context that is appropriate for the respective occupation. Understanding and respect should also be important aspects of the educational task at these schools, as these are key points in preventing blatant and massive human rights violations.

=== Pedagogical influence in the classroom ===
For Litt, "instruction" and "education" are to be seen as interlinked, because an educational aspect always flows into instruction. The pedagogical effect is decisive for orderly and consistent teaching, which focuses on education for objectivity, work ethic and fulfilment of duty. Litt finds it advantageous when the above-mentioned values are passed on by teachers without them having to exert direct influence on pupils, since every teacher has a different educational radiance and way of looking at things. Besides the reciprocal intertwining of "teaching" and "education", there is also one for "intellect" and "character" or "knowledge" and "education". "Knowledge" is always an assessment of the situation, and the becoming one of knowledge and conscience is a prerequisite for action to correspond to knowledge (belief).

== Tasks of the teachers ==
=== Required characteristics ===
Litt is of the opinion that there are born educators who are naturally endowed with an outstanding educational talent; nevertheless, most educators must learn certain aids and educational methods. In a narrower sense, this means the consistency and definiteness of pedagogical form and an unrestricted knowledge of teaching methods. In addition, Litt argues in favour of the methodical, because systematic, planned procedures leave no room for misconstructions. In addition to methodological knowledge, pedagogical theory should be emphasised as a requirement for the teacher, even if it has nothing to do with practical implementation per se. Rather, it has a "historical site consciousness" which teachers should use to make it easier for students to find their way in world affairs. By historical location awareness, Litt also understands the "breadth of the intellectual horizon". It allows the teacher to convincingly represent the "spiritual powers whose precipitation confronts him as the content of his teaching activity. Moreover, it gives him the competence to face contemporary phenomena in an examining and conscientious manner. Pedagogical theory also has the task of giving the prospective teacher a sense of his pedagogical self-determination, based on inner freedom and a sense of duty. A good teacher can be recognised by the fact that he or she has the self-control not to take sides, but is able to confront contentious issues and central questions of life on a level of unity. For Litt, wanting to ideologically penetrate and influence the school is a danger.

=== Granting freedom of choice ===
It is a mistake to deprive pupils of the opportunity to make decisions regarding their personal worldview by trying to take them in early on for that of the educating generation. Instead, they should be given the opportunity to shape their own vision of the future. This requires tolerance from the teacher and a taming of his own wishful images and ideas. In this way, he is also better able to connect the pupils with the objective culture and to act as a mediator between the "I" and the "world", so that the educational process leads via the person to the thing. The teacher has the duty to bring objective content closer to his pupils. Education only fulfils its purpose if, in addition to "letting the growing person grow", guiding is also seen as a component of the educational process. Merely observing the direction of a child's development and meeting his or her requirements and preferences as well as promoting his or her interests is regressive as a sole "educational measure" and in no way sufficient for the developing human being. "I" and "world" are in a reciprocal process of development and the confrontation with objective contents corresponding to the age as well as the talents is fundamental for the process of becoming a human being.

== Honours ==
- Mitglied des Ordens Pour le Mérite, Friedensklasse (1952)
- Großes Bundesverdienstkreuz mit Stern (20 December 1955)
- Austrian Decoration for Science and Art (1958)
- Großes Bundesverdienstkreuz mit Stern und Schulterband (27 December 1960)

== Work ==
=== Independent publications ===
- Geschichte und Leben. Von den Bildungsaufgaben geschichtlichen und sprachlichen Unterrichts. Leipzig/Berlin 1918; from the 2nd, modified edition with the subtitle Probleme und Ziele kulturwissenschaftlicher Bildung.
- Individuum und Gemeinschaft. Grundfragen der sozialen Theorie und Ethik. Leipzig/Berlin 1919; from the 2nd, modified edition (1924) with the subtitle Grundlegung der Kulturphilosophie; 3rd, again revised edition. 1926.
- Erkenntnis und Leben. Untersuchungen über Gliederung, Methoden und Beruf der Wissenschaft. Leipzig/Berlin 1923.
- Die Philosophie der Gegenwart und ihr Einfluss auf das Bildungsideal. Leipzig/Berlin 1925.
- Möglichkeiten und Grenzen der Pädagogik. Abhandlungen zur gegenwärtigen Lage von Erziehung und Erziehungstheorie. Leipzig/Berlin 1926.
- Führen oder Wachsenlassen. Eine Erörterung des pädagogischen Grundproblems. Leipzig/Berlin 1927.
- Wissenschaft, Bildung, Weltanschauung. Leipzig/Berlin 1928.
- Kant und Herder als Deuter der geistigen Welt. Leipzig 1930.
- Einleitung in die Philosophie. Leipzig/Berlin 1933.
- Die Selbsterkenntnis des Menschen. Leipzig 1938.
- Der deutsche Geist und das Christentum. Vom Wesen geschichtlicher Begegnung. Klotz, Leipzig 1938, DNB-IDN 57463567X; Nachdr. als Gemeinschaftsausgabe: Fischer, Norderstedt; Leipziger Univ.-Verlag, Leipzig 1997, ISBN 3-926049-15-4 and ISBN 3-931922-55-3.
- Das Allgemeine im Aufbau der geisteswissenschaftlichen Erkenntnis. Leipzig 1941.
- Geschichte und Verantwortung. Wiesbaden 1947.
- Denken und Sein. Stuttgart/Zürich 1948.
- Mensch und Welt. Grundlinien einer Philosophie des Geistes. Munich 1948.
- Staatsgewalt und Sittlichkeit. Munich 1948.
- Wege und Irrwege geschichtlichen Denkens. Munich 1948.
- Die Geschichte und das Übergeschichtliche. Hamburg 1949.
- Geschichtswissenschaft und Geschichtsphilosophie. Munich 1950.
- Der Mensch vor der Geschichte. Bremen 1950.
- Naturwissenschaft und Menschenbildung. Heidelberg 1952.
- Hegel. Versuch einer kritischen Erneuerung. Heidelberg 1953.
- Das Bildungsideal der deutschen Klassik und die moderne Arbeitswelt. Bonn 1955.
- Die Wiedererweckung des geschichtlichen Bewußtseins. Heidelberg 1956.
- Technisches Denken und menschliche Bildung. Heidelberg 1957.
- Leibniz und die deutsche Gegenwart. Wiesbaden 1947.
- Wissenschaft und Menschenbildung im Lichte des Ost-West-Gegensatzes. Heidelberg 1958.
- Freiheit und Lebensordnung. Zur Philosophie und Pädagogik der Demokratie. Heidelberg 1962.
- Pädagogik und Kultur. Kleine pädagogische Schriften 1918–1926. Edited by F. Nicolin, Bad Heilbrunn 1965.
- Ethik der Neuzeit, München, Wien : Oldenbourg, 1976

=== Essays ===
- Die höhere Schule und das Problem der Einheitsschule. In Monatsschrift für höhere Schulen. 18 (1919), pp. 280–293.
- Hegel und die Aufgaben deutscher Jugend. In Jugendführer und Jugendprobleme (Festschrift zu Georg Kerschensteiners 70. Geburtstag). Edited by Aloys Fischer, Eduard Spranger. Leipzig/Berlin 1930.
- Hegels Begriff des „Geistes“ und das Problem der Tradition. In Studium Generale. volume 4. Springer, pp. 241–244.
- Leitsätze zur Begründung eines realistischen höheren Schulwesens. In Bildung und Erziehung. 5 (1952), pp. 241–244.
- Charakterbildung geht vor Wissensbildung. In Pädagogische Wahrheiten und Halbwahrheiten kritisch beleuchtet (Festgabe für Wilhelm Flitner zum 70. Geburtstag). Edited by Eduard Spranger. Quelle & Meyer, Heidelberg 1959, DNB-IDN 455347247, pp. 41–67.
