= Karl Dilthey =

German classical philologist and archaeologist

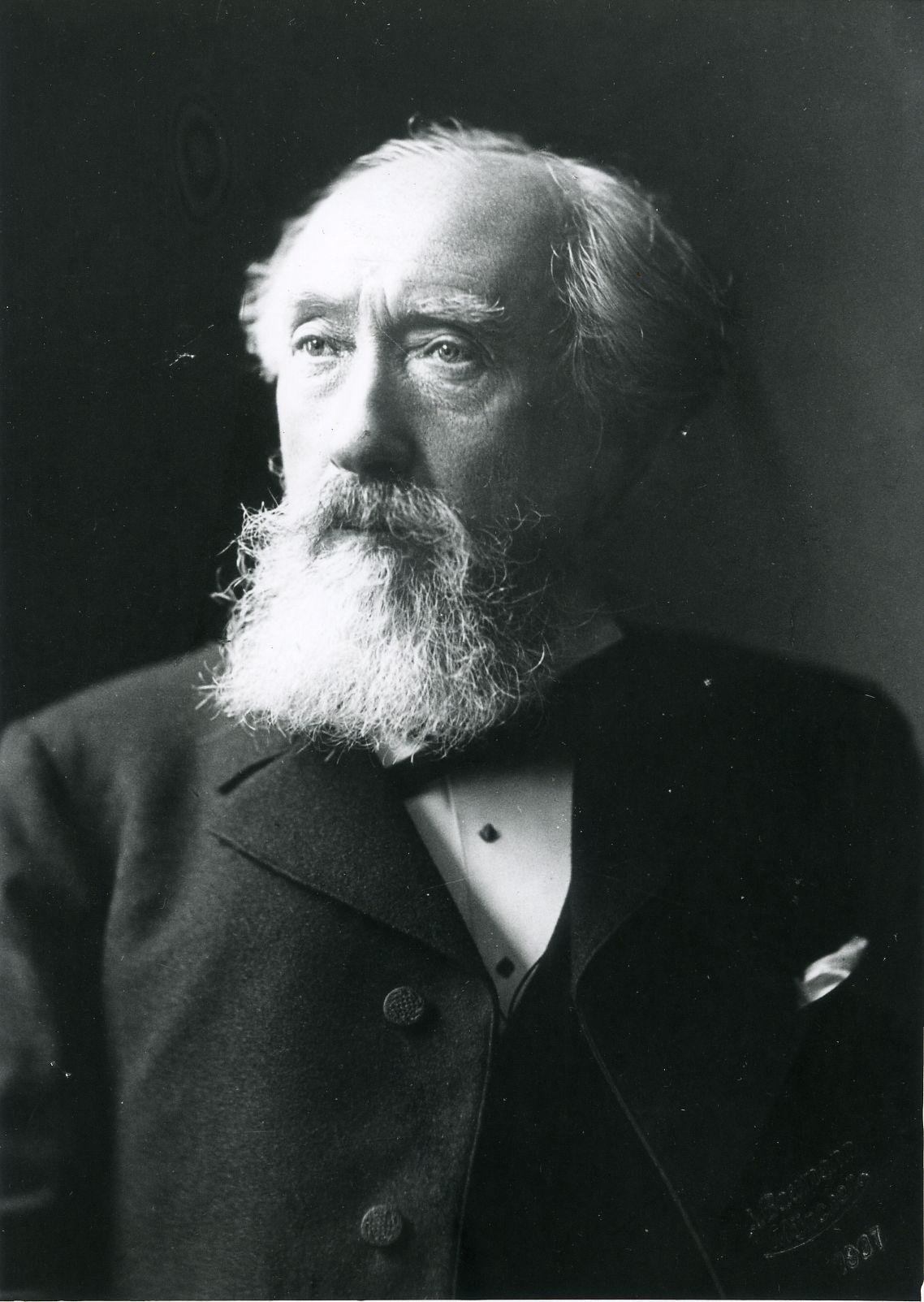
Karl Dilthey

Karl Dilthey (18 March 1839, Biebrich – 4 March 1907, Göttingen) was a German classical scholar and archaeologist.

After studying at Breslau and Bonn, Dilthey — younger brother of the renowned philosopher Wilhelm Dilthey — travelled to Greece. After being privatdozent at Bonn until 1866/67, he moved to Rome and in 1869 to the University of Zurich, where he was appointed a full professor of classical philology and archaeology. In 1878, he moved to Göttingen as a full professor of classical philology, later archaeology. He became director to the archaeological-numismatic collections of the university and a full member of the Göttingen Academy of Sciences.

== Published works ==
- De Callimachi Cydippa, 1863.
- Analecta Callimachea, 1865.
- Novellen und Erzählungen, 1872 – Novellas and short stories (3 volumes).
- Observationes criticae in anthologiam graecam additae sunt, 1878.
- Adduntur epigrammata graeca in muris picta duo tabulis lithographis expressa, 1879.
- De epigrammatum graecorum syllogis quibusdam minoribus commentatio, 1887.
- Symbolae criticae ad anthologiam graecam ex libris manu scriptis petitae, 1891.
- Otfried Müller, 1898; On Otfried Müller (1797–1840); from a lecture given at the Georg-Augusts-Universität on December 1, 1897.
