= Social mirror theory =

Social mirror theory (SMT) states that people are not capable of self-reflection without taking into consideration a peer's interpretation of the experience. In other words, people define and resolve their internal musings through other's viewpoint. SMT's background is derived from the 1800s from concepts related to the study of public opinion and social interaction by Wilhelm Dilthey, the German philosopher and sociologist.

SMT suggests that people, in general, are not capable of self-reflection without taking into consideration a peer's interpretation of the experience. Burgoon and Hale (1984) conceptualized relational communication as the verbal and nonverbal themes present in people's communication that define an interpersonal relationship.

== History ==
SMT is also referred to as mimicry. Mimicry serves as an important impersonal function. The notion that individuals mimic the behaviors of others has long been of interest to psychologists.

Over the past 30 years, there has been a noticeable surge in research exploring the subtle and unintentional ways in which people imitate their social interaction partners, including mimicry of facial expressions, emotions, speech patterns and physical movements. Non-conscious mimicry is notably different than conscious imitation or modeling and is an important part of social learning theory (SLT). To understand why we mimic and articulate the functions that mimicry serves, systemic investigations into mimicry's wide-ranging consequences have been conducted through investigations into the factors that may facilitate and inhibit non conscious mimicry.

== Support and effectiveness of mimicry ==
When two or more people engage in conversation, the person that converses is accustomed to being looked at. Therefore, making eye contact and mimicking the eye contact creates a mirrored effect to the other person to expect conversation and dialogue.

Many prominent scholars have studied Non Conscious Behavioral Mimicry (NcBM). NcBM occurs when a person unwittingly imitates the behaviors of another person. The spontaneous imitation of gestures, postures, mannerisms, and other motor movements is pervasive in human interactions. Existing reviews focuses on two recent themes in the mimicry literature.

== Lakin and Chartrand's non-conscious behavioral mimicry studies ==
In early 2000, initially an analysis of the moderators of mimicry uncovered the various motivational, social, emotional, and personality factors that led to more or less mimicry of an interaction partner in a given situation. Secondly, a significant amount of recent research was conducted and identified important downstream consequences of mimicking or being mimicked by another person. The consequences included not only increased pro-sociality between those interacting, but also the unexpected effects on the individual.

The current experiments explored whether having a goal to affiliate augments the tendency to mimic the behaviors of interaction partners. Experiment 1 demonstrated that having an affiliation goal increases non conscious mimicry, and Experiment 2 further supported this proposition by demonstrating that people who have unsuccessfully attempted to affiliate in an interaction subsequently exhibit more mimicry than those who have not experienced such a failure. Results suggest that behavioral mimicry may be part of a person's repertoire of behaviors, used non consciously, when there is a desire to create rapport.

== Basic concepts of mimicry ==
There are multiple concepts that may fall under the aegis of mimicry. Behavioral mimicry is also placed in its broader context as a form of interpersonal coordination. It is often compared to interactional synchrony and other social contagion effects, including verbal, facial, emotional and behavioral mimicry with similar emotional and attitudinal convergence.

- Facial mimicry is the resemblance shown by one animal species to another which protects it from predators, perceived or otherwise. Dimberg's research revealed that mothers tend to open their mouths in response to their infants opening and closing the mouth to feed. There is substantial and compelling evidence that supports mimicry of facial expressions occurs automatically.
- Emotional mimicry: a 2000 study concluded that facial actions can automatically elicit feelings. When a mood is being displayed is a happy mood, both high and low emotions are expressive and participants in study pass their moods from one to another.
- Verbal mimicry: a 1971 study concluded that a number of verbal tendencies are mimicked. A 1986 study with infants concluded that newborns as young as 2–4 days old, will cry in response to another infants crying. Also verbal mimicry is revealed in speech patterns, conducted with adult's show that speakers tend to adopt each other's accents, latency to speak, rate of speech, utter durations and sentence syntax.
- Behavioral mimicry: characteristic traits are noticed in body positioning and postures. These traits would fit into the dynamics noted between interacting individuals. The psychotherapist Albert Scheflen wrote in 1964 that mimicry or postural congruence was an indicator of similarity in views or rules among interacting individuals in similar settings, focused on mimicry of specific mannerisms and confirmed that mimicry occurs spontaneously in dyadic interactions.

== Gender roles of mimicry ==
Research has demonstrated that gender plays an important role in behavioral mimicry. Some of the earliest work on mimicry was conducted in the domains of clinical psychology and counseling. There are strong links that three facets of rapport, or mutual attention, coordination, and positivity, are associated with non-verbal behavioral mimicry. Women, but not men, were slower to recognize the affective valence of briefly-displayed facial expressions when constrained from mimicking them, attributed to the fact that facial constraints hinder women’s capacity to empathize. Deceptive mimicry in gender identity masquerades and camouflages in the nonverbal behaviors. The optimal distinctiveness theory (ODT) hypothesizes that people are in a continual quest to balance the need for distinctiveness (seeing them differently) or assimilation (seeing themselves similar to others) and that such a balance is a direct lead to mimicry. Chartrand and Bargh (1999) have coined the phrase “The Chameleon Effect” to describe the non-conscious behavioral mimicry of individuals modulating their own behavior to blend in with a current environment.

== See also ==
- Interpersonal communication
- Expectancy violations theory
