= Johann Christian Jüngken =

German ophthalmologist and surgeon

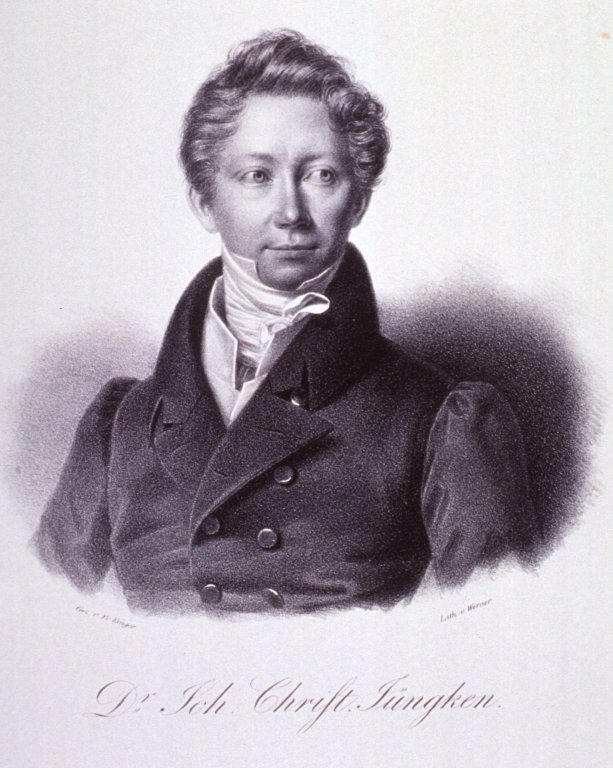
Johann Christian Jüngken

Johann Christian Jüngken (12 June 1794, Burg bei Magdeburg – 9 September 1875, Hanover) was a German ophthalmologist and surgeon.

He studied medicine and natural sciences at the University of Göttingen, where his instructors included Conrad Johann Martin Langenbeck and Karl Gustav Himly. In 1815 he served as a volunteer hospital assistant in Berlin and Brussels, about which, he gained experience in the treatment of battle-inflicted wounds. While in what is now Belgium, he also had the opportunity to study soldiers afflicted with a disease referred to as "Egyptian ophthalmia". In 1816 he continued his education at the University of Berlin, where following graduation, he worked as an assistant in the department of ophthalmology under Karl Ferdinand von Graefe. In 1825 he became an associate professor and a member of the Ober-Examinations-Kommission.

In 1828, he was appointed director of the newly formed department of ophthalmology at the Charité-Berlin, a position he would maintain for the next forty years. In 1834 he became a full professor of surgery and ophthalmology, and during the same year, was called as a consultant to Brussels in order to research an outbreak of ophthalmia affecting the Belgian army. In 1841, after the death of Johann Nepomuk Rust, he took on additional duties as director of surgery at the Charité. Jüngken was among the first physicians to use chloroform for eye surgery operations.

== Selected works ==
- De pupillae artificialis per Coreoncion Graefianum conformatione, 1817 (doctorate thesis).
- Nunquam lux clara ophthalmiae neonatorum, causa est occasionalis, 1817 (habilitation thesis).
- Die Lehre von den Augenoperationen, 1829 – The doctrine of eye operations.
- Ueber die Augenkrankheit, welche in der belgischen Armee herrscht, 1834 – On a prevailing eye disease affecting the Belgian army.
- Die Lehre von den Augenkrankheiten, (2nd edition, 1836) – The doctrine of eye diseases.
- Ueber die Anwendung des Chloroforms bei Augenoperationen, 1850 – Concerning the use of chloroform in eye surgery.
