= Georg Misch =

German philosopher (1878–1965)

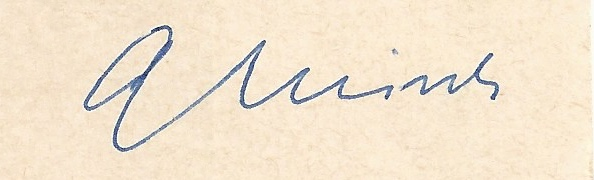
Signature of Georg Misch

Georg Misch (German: [mɪʃ]; 5 April 1878, in Berlin – 10 June 1965, in Göttingen) was a German philosopher.

== Life ==
Of Jewish descent, Misch was the pupil and son-in-law of Wilhelm Dilthey. Misch attempted to further develop Dilthey's life-philosophical hermeneutics, in particular in relation to the study of logic, comparative philosophy and autobiography. Misch edited a number of volumes of Dilthey's works. Misch concluded his studies with Dilthey in Berlin in 1900 with a dissertation on Die philosophische Begründung des Positivismus in den Schriften von D’Alembert und Turgot. He worked as a professor in Marburg and Göttingen before retiring under pressure from the National Socialist government in 1935. He went into exile to the UK, living there from 1939 until 1946. Misch returned to Göttingen in 1946 and continued to work there until his death in 1965.

His students include Otto Friedrich Bollnow and Josef König.

== Work ==
Georg Misch wrote one of the first extended critical appropriations of Edmund Husserl and Martin Heidegger, which evaluated phenomenology from the perspective of Dilthey's philosophy, in Lebensphilosophie und Phänomenologie. Eine Auseinandersetzung der Diltheyschen Richtung mit Heidegger und Husserl, Leipzig 1930 (3. Aufl. Stuttgart 1964). Misch's Der Weg in die Philosophie ["The Way into Philosophy"(1926) is a pioneering work in comparative and intercultural philosophy. He developed a hermeneutic logic that was later published as Der Aufbau der Logik auf dem Boden der Philosophie des Lebens. He is mostly known for his monumental Geschichte der Autobiographie (History of Autobiography), in several volumes, beginning in 1907. The last volume was published posthumously in 1969.

== Selected works ==
- Geschichte der Autobiographie, zwei Bände, Leipzig/Berlin 1907 (Bd. I, 3. Aufl. 1969; Bd. II, 2. Aufl. 1955). Translated in English as A History of Autobiography in Antiquity (Part 1), London 2003.
- Der Weg in die Philosophie, Leipzig 1926 (2. Aufl. 1950). Translated in English as The Dawn of Philosophy: A Philosophical Primer, Cambridge, MA 1951.
- Lebensphilosophie und Phänomenologie. Eine Auseinandersetzung der Diltheyschen Richtung mit Heidegger und Husserl, Leipzig 1930 (3. Aufl. Stuttgart 1964)
- Der Aufbau der Logik auf dem Boden der Philosophie des Lebens, Freiburg 2002.
