= Seismic Micro-Technology =

Seismic Micro-Technology, Inc.
- Type: Incorporated
- Industry: Energy/Geoscience Software
- Headquarters: Houston, Texas, United States
- Key people: Arshad Matin, CEO & President
- Products: Kingdom Advanced, Kingdom Core

Seismic Micro-Technology (SMT) is the maker of KINGDOM software. It is the global market share leader for Windows based interpretation. SMT developed the first seismic interpretation tools for the Windows environment. KINGDOM software is used by 2,700 companies in over 95 countries. KINGDOM software is used to find sources of oil and gas in the subsurface and is used by 85 percent of the 150 largest petroleum exploration and production companies. SMT's customer base includes international and national companies as well as independent companies and consultants. More than 50 percent of sales come from international sales. On August 11, 2011, Seismic Micro Technology was acquired by IHS Markit.

== Business locations ==
Seismic Micro-Technology's headquarters resides in Houston, Texas. Branch offices are located in Croydon (UK), Moscow, Brazil, Singapore and Calgary.

== Company history ==
Dr. Thomas Smith founded SMT in 1984 to begin developing software that would become known as KINGDOM. In 1985, SMT licensed the first KINGDOM license on a PC in DOS to Chevron. In 1993, SMT sold the first Windows NT application for oil & gas industry to Barrett Bros. In 1996, the first integrated 2D and 3D seismic package into the Windows environment. In 2000, SMT software was in 23 of the top 50 oil & gas operators. In 2003, SMT Europe opened its office in Croydon, England. In 2006, SMT Asia opened its office in Singapore and there were more new licenses sold outside the United States than in it for the first time.

In 2009 SMT signed a software contract with India's Oil & Natural Gas Corporation, agreeing to train 200 geoscientists on both interpretation best practices and KINGDOM software in six Indian cities.

In 2007 the company re-capitalized with investments from Technology Crossover Ventures (TCV) and JMI Equity (JMI). Jake Reynolds, General Partner of TCV; David Yuan, Vice President of TCV; and Bob Smith, General Partner of JMI joined SMT's Board of Directors at this same time.

At that time, Founder and CEO Thomas Smith retired with Arshad Matin becoming CEO and President, and a member of the Board of Directors. Previously, he had served as vice president and general manager of the compliance and security management business at Symantec.

== Products ==
SMT's KINGDOM 8.3 was updated to 8.4 in 2009 to aid oil and gas companies attempting to capitalize on unconventional locations for drilling. In 2008, the Welling Report ranked SMT as holding the largest market share for PC-based interpretation.

== University program ==
SMT has established a software donation program for 160 universities in key oil and gas regions in 27 countries. The goal of SMT's Educational Gifts Program is to put workstation software in the classroom so those students graduating from universities are equipped for the job market with workstation experience. The donations began in 2001 and occur in the form of three-year grants. The total estimated value exceeded more than $150 million. Of the $150 million, $1.5 million of the donation went to Imperial College in London and $1.4 million to the University of Houston.
