= Geisteswissenschaft =

Set of human sciences

Geisteswissenschaft (German pronunciation: [ˈɡaɪstəsˌvɪsənʃaft]; plural: Geisteswissenschaften [ˈɡaɪstəsˌvɪsənʃaftən]; "science of mind"; lit. "spirit science") is a set of human sciences such as philosophy, history, philology, musicology, linguistics, theater studies, literary studies, media studies, religious studies and sometimes even jurisprudence, that are traditional in German universities. Most of its subject matter would come under Humanities in the typical English-speaking university.

== History ==
The concept of Geist dates back to eighteenth- and nineteenth-century German idealism, in particular to Herder's and Hegel's concept of a Volksgeist, the alleged common "spirit", or rather, mind, of a people. To understand the term Geisteswissenschaften, one should bear in mind that the continental faculty of philosophy inherited the medieval faculty of arts. Besides philosophy itself, it encompassed the natural sciences, including mathematics, the philological and historical disciplines, and, later on, psychology and the social sciences. The term Geisteswissenschaften was first used as a translation of John Stuart Mill's term "moral sciences". The historian, philosopher and sociologist Wilhelm Dilthey popularised the term, arguing that psychology and the emerging field of sociology – like the philological and historical disciplines – should be considered as Geisteswissenschaft rather than as Naturwissenschaft (natural science), and that their methodology should reflect this classification. His arguments were highly influential in the development of the theories of the prominent German sociologist Max Weber. However, Weber preferred the term Kulturwissenschaft, which was promoted by his neo-Kantian colleagues (Wilhelm Windelband and Heinrich Rickert).

== Current use ==
Since the times of Dilthey, it has become common to speak of the Naturwissenschaften on the one hand and the Geisteswissenschaften on the other, not particularly considering the status of mathematics and of philosophy itself. After the natural sciences and mathematics were separated into a distinct faculty (in some universities not until the 1950s), the Geisteswissenschaften were left alone in the philosophical faculty, and even philosophy was often subsumed under the term Geisteswissenschaften. Meanwhile, many German universities have split these faculties into smaller departments, making the old common interests and boundaries less visible.

The term is now used irregularly. In administrative contexts, it is used broadly to discuss how to organize academic institutions and to describe the culture of academic discussion, thereby including the faculties of Theology and Law among the Geisteswissenschaften. In some contexts of science policy, the Geisteswissenschaften are described as non-empirical sciences, drawing them closer to philosophy and excluding the social sciences from their domain.

In the context of methodology on the contrary it has been emphasised, that Geisteswissenschaften such as history and the philological disciplines, relying on empirical data (documents, books and utterances), along with psychology and the social sciences, have a common empirical character, which is essentially based on comprehension (Verstehen) or understanding of expressions of meaning.

Other authors, like Rudolf Steiner, used the term Geisteswissenschaft in a historically quite distinct sense to refer to a proposed "Science of Spirit".

== Example usage ==
From Kulturgeschichte Frankreichs, Suchanek-Fröhlich, p. 633:

Man hat Taine vorgeworfen, dass er, dessen Hauptziel die Einführung naturwissenschaftlicher Methoden in die Geisteswissenschaften war, selbst nicht induktiv, sondern deduktiv vorging.

Translation:

Some reproach Taine in that he himself, whose goal was the introduction of the methods of natural science into the Geisteswissenschaften, proceeded from methods which were not inductive but rather deductive.

== Bibliography ==
- Gunter Scholz, Zwischen Wissenschaftsanspruch und Orientierungsbedürfnis. Zu Grundlage und Wandel der Geisteswissenschaften Frankfurt am Main, Suhrkamp 1991, ISBN 3-518-28566-1
- Bernward Grünewald, Geist – Kultur – Gesellschaft. Versuch einer Prinzipientheorie der Geisteswissenschaften auf transzendentalphilosophischer Grundlage, Berlin, Duncker & Humblot, 2009, ISBN 978-3-428-13160-0.
- Albrecht Behmel, Erfolgreich im Studium der Geisteswissenschaften, Francke, Tübingen 2005, ISBN 3-7720-3371-7
